= Flerzheim =

- Stadtteil of Rheinbach
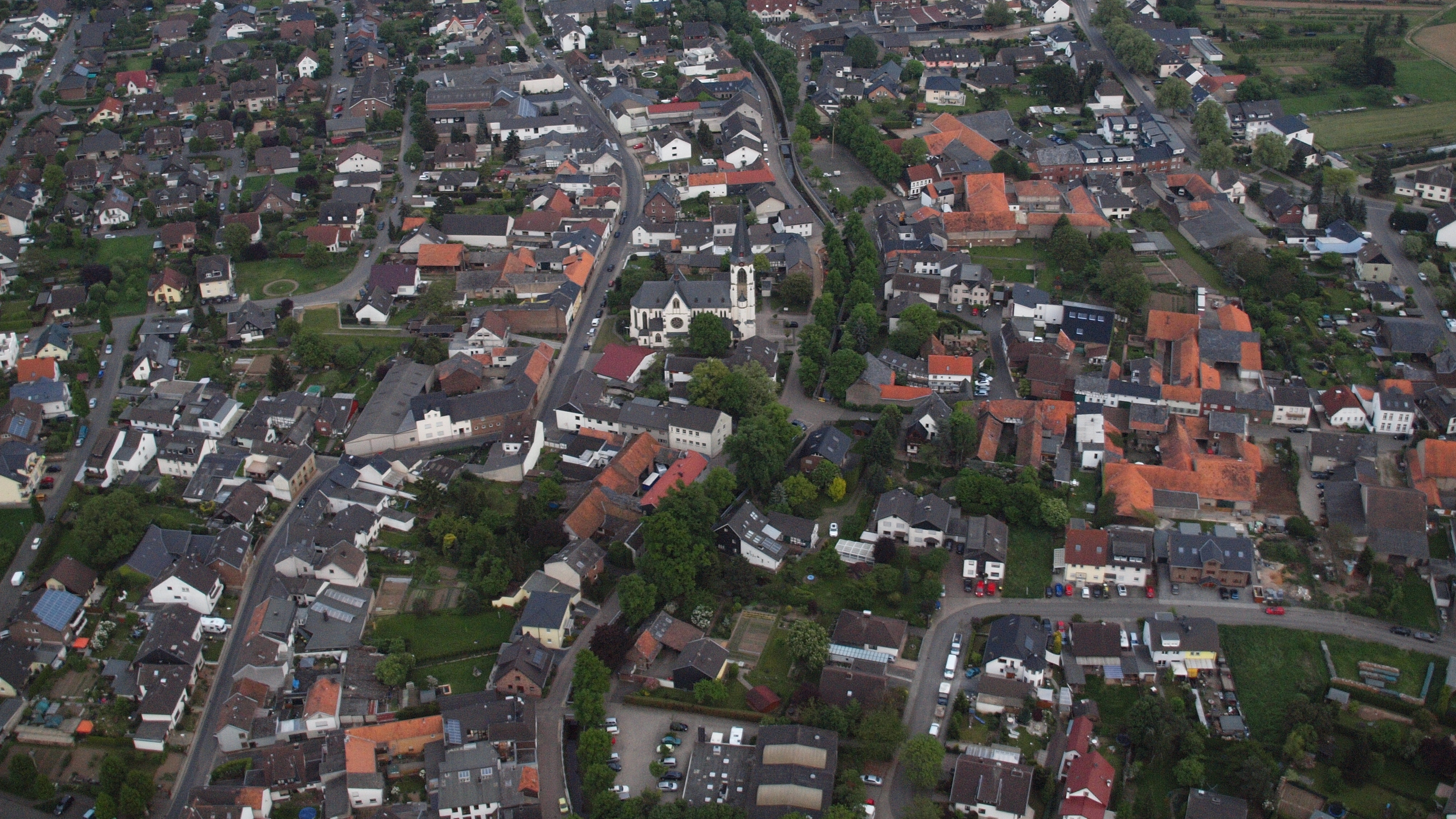
- Aerial view
- Interactive map of Flerzheim
- Location within Germany Location within North Rhine-Westphalia
- Coordinates: 50°38′49″N 6°59′15″E
- Country: Germany
- State: North Rhine-Westphalia
- Admin. region: Cologne
- District: Rhein-Sieg-Kreis
- Town: Rheinbach
- Founded: 807
- Time zone: UTC+01:00 (CET)
  - Summer (DST): UTC+02:00 (CEST)

Flerzheim is a part (Stadtteil) of Rheinbach in the Rhein-Sieg-Kreis in North Rhine-Westphalia, Germany.

== Location ==
Flerzheim is located twelve kilometres southwest of Bonn in the Cologne Lowland in the foothills of the Eifel, in Germany. Through the town flows the river Swist. North of the town is Müttinghoven, and Lüftelberg east; south and west of the town is Meckenheim Ramershoven. Flerzheim is adjacent to the park Kottenforst-Ville.

== History ==
As early as 5000 years ago people lived on the territory of today Flerzheims. In the year 31 BC, the Romans settled in the district. Around the year 20 AD, they established a well-known villa north of Flerzheim in the 4th century but was destroyed. Today's Flerzheim was founded in 807 AD.

Under the Bonn-law, Flerzheim was recognized on 1 January 1969 as a district on the Rhine river. Flerzheim is retained as a separate village as part of the town Rheinbach; however, the phone prefix number is the town of Meckenheim (02225).

The Flerzheim area sustained significant damage following the floods of 2021.

== Transportation ==
The bus line 800 of Bonn / Rhine river of regional Cologne Buservice (RVK) provides links to other safe places. Also located within 5 kilometers of 3 stops the Voreifel train from Bonn to Euskirchen. In the city, the country's roads 113 and 163 meet. Two highways run west in the vicinity: the A61 is 2 km away and the A565 east 4 km away.

== Attractions ==
- St. Martin (Flerzheim)
- Heisterbach Abbey

== Notable persons ==
- Andreas Gau (1800–1862), Catholic theologian
