= Swist =

River in Germany

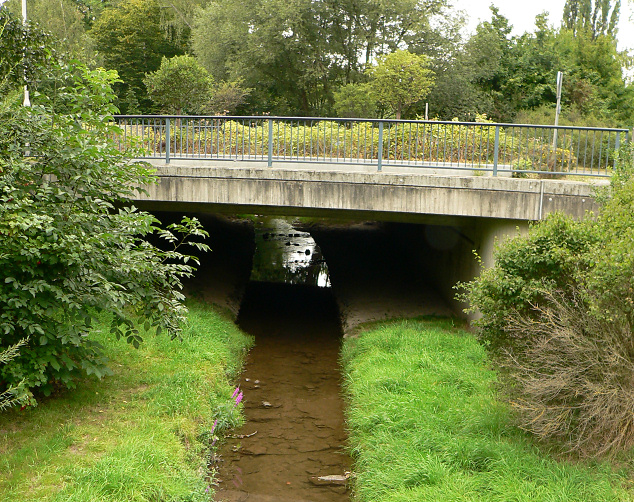
- The Swist in Meckenheim

Location
- Country: Germany
- States: North Rhine-Westphalia; Rhineland-Palatinate
- Reference no.: DE: 2742

Physical characteristics
- Source
  - location: Near Kalenborn (bei Altenahr)
  - coordinates: 50°33′16″N 6°59′09″E
  - elevation: ca. 330 m above sea level (NHN)
- Mouth
  - location: Near Bliesheim into the Erft
  - coordinates: 50°46′32″N 6°49′56″E
  - elevation: ca. 106 m above sea level (NHN)
- Length: 43.7 km (27.2 mi)
- Basin size: 289.408 km^{2} (111.741 sq mi)

Basin features
- Progression: Erft→ Rhine→ North Sea
- Landmarks: Large towns: Meckenheim; Villages: Grafschaft, Swisttal, Weilerswist

The Swist (German pronunciation: [svɪst]) is a stream, 43.6 kilometres (27.1 mi) long, in the German Rhineland. It rises on the northern edge of the Eifel at 330 metres above sea level and empties from the right and southeast into the Rhine tributary, the Erft, between Weilerswist and Bliesheim (a district of Erftstadt). Occasionally the Swist is also called the Swistbach, and locals often just call it der Bach ("the stream").

The Swist flows through the municipality Swisttal, the town of Meckenheim and Flerzheim. There are cycle paths by the side of the stream along this stretch. The Swist gave its name to Swisttal and the town of Weilerswist. Its source area is situated at the northern edge of the Eifel.

== Geography ==
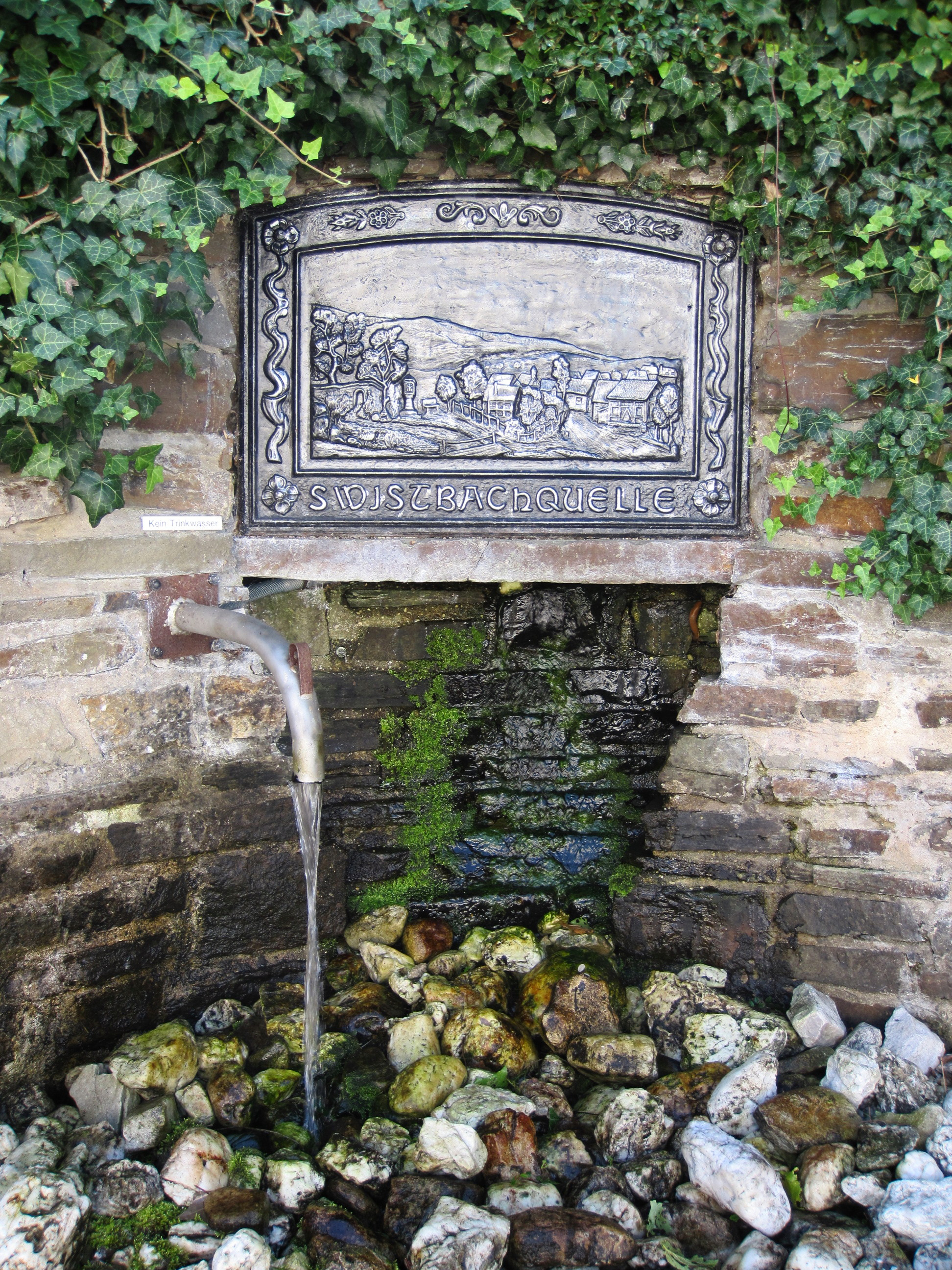
The source of the Swistbach in Kalenborn

=== Course ===
Its source lies at 330 m above sea level (NN) in the northern part of the Eifel in the Ahr Hills, north of the village of Kalenborn in the collective municipality of Altenahr in the county of Ahrweiler. The Swist has an average gradient of 5 ‰ and flows initially to Vettelhoven (Grafschaft) in a northeasterly direction and then descends at a gradient of just 1.3 ‰ through the Fore-Eifel. It continues along the western slopes of the hill ridge Ville in the börde landscape of the Rheinbach Loess Plateau through Meckenheim, Flerzheim, Morenhoven, Heimerzheim and Metternich. At 106 m above NN the Swist empties into the Erft between Weilerswist and Bliesheim.

=== Catchment ===
Its catchment area lies between that of the Rhine near Bonn and its smaller tributaries like the Hardtbach or Alfterer Bornheimer Bach to the northwest and that of its parent river, the Erft around Euskirchen right in the west and peters out quickly towards the north-northwest. It is rural and, in the open country, arable fields predominate. Around the upper courses of the stream and its especially along its important left-hand tributaries there is a large contiguous forest as well as pastures and meadows. The largest part of the catchment belongs to the state of North Rhine-Westphalia, the source region is in Rhineland-Palatinate.

=== Tributaries ===
The most important tributary of the Swist is the Steinbach, which joins from the left at river kilometre 15.7 as the Jungbach. Between Schweinheim and Essig it bears the name Orbach. The 20.5-kilometre-long (12.7 mi) stream has a catchment of 48.227 km^{2} (18.621 sq mi) which is about 17% that of the Swist. The tributaries of the Swist are listed below.

Name	Position [km]	Location	Length [km]	Catchment [km^{2}]	Mouth height [m. ü. NN]	DGKZ
Kahlenborner Bach/Swistbach	42.939	right	0.6			2742 112
Buchenwaldbach	42.407	left	1.0			2742 114
Nonnenbach	39.185	right	2.2	1.950		2742 12
Bach von Alteheck	38.103	right	1.5	1.262		2742 132
N.N.	35,251	left	1.1			2742 134
Unnamed stream	32;660	left	1.7			2742 136
Unnamed stream	31,899	right	1.4			2742 138
Essigbach	29.680	left	5.9	7.629	182	2742 14
Mühlengraben/Spießgraben	29,334	right	1.4	4.405	178	2742 16
Altendorfer Bach	28.585	left	10.0	11.534	176	2742 2
Ersdorfer Bach	27.247	left	7.5	5.267	170	2742 32
Morsbach/Wormersdorfer Bach	24.692	left	6.7	12.342	161	2742 34
Unnamed stream	22.675	right	3.1		155	2742 392
Mühlengraben	19.088	right	2.1		146	2742 394
Eulenbach	19.066	links	12.3	23.059	146	2742 4
Wallbach	17.589	left	8.9	22.600	143	2742 52
Steinbach/Orbach/Jungbach	15.717	left	20.5	48.227	140	2742 6
Buschbach	13.482	right	8.2	21.965	134	2742 74
Schießbach	12.676	left	13.7	16.627	132	2742 8
Mühlengraben	12.141	right	1.6		131	2742 912
Uhlshover Graben	12.01	left	1,8		131	
Kottengrover Graben	11.485	right	0.7	0.736	130	2742 92
Kriegshover Bach	9.733	right	4.2	8.042	127	2742 94
Müggenhausener Fließ	3.999	left	5.2	11.846	113	2742 96
Weilerswister Mühlgraben	0.675	left	2.9		107	2742 992

== River history ==
Originally the River Ahr flowed in what is now the riverbed of the Swist. After the uplifting of the Ahr Hills, and its route northwards was barred, the Ahr tried to find a way directly to the Rhine.

In places it is said that the Swist is the longest stream (i.e. German Bach, small river) in Europe This probably goes back to when its course was marked by wide meanders in the area of the low gradient between Vettelhoven and its mouth. Since the straightening of the Swist in the early 20th century and certainly no later than its canalisation in the 1960s it has probably lost this record.

== Historic bridges ==
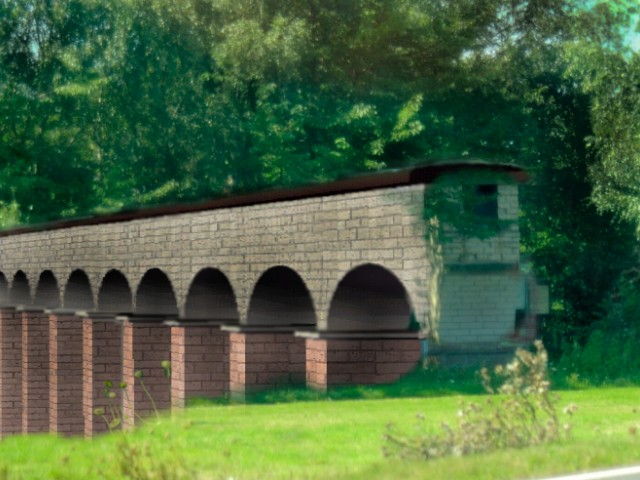
Virtual simulation of the old arch bridge of the Roman aqueduct in the Swistbachaue

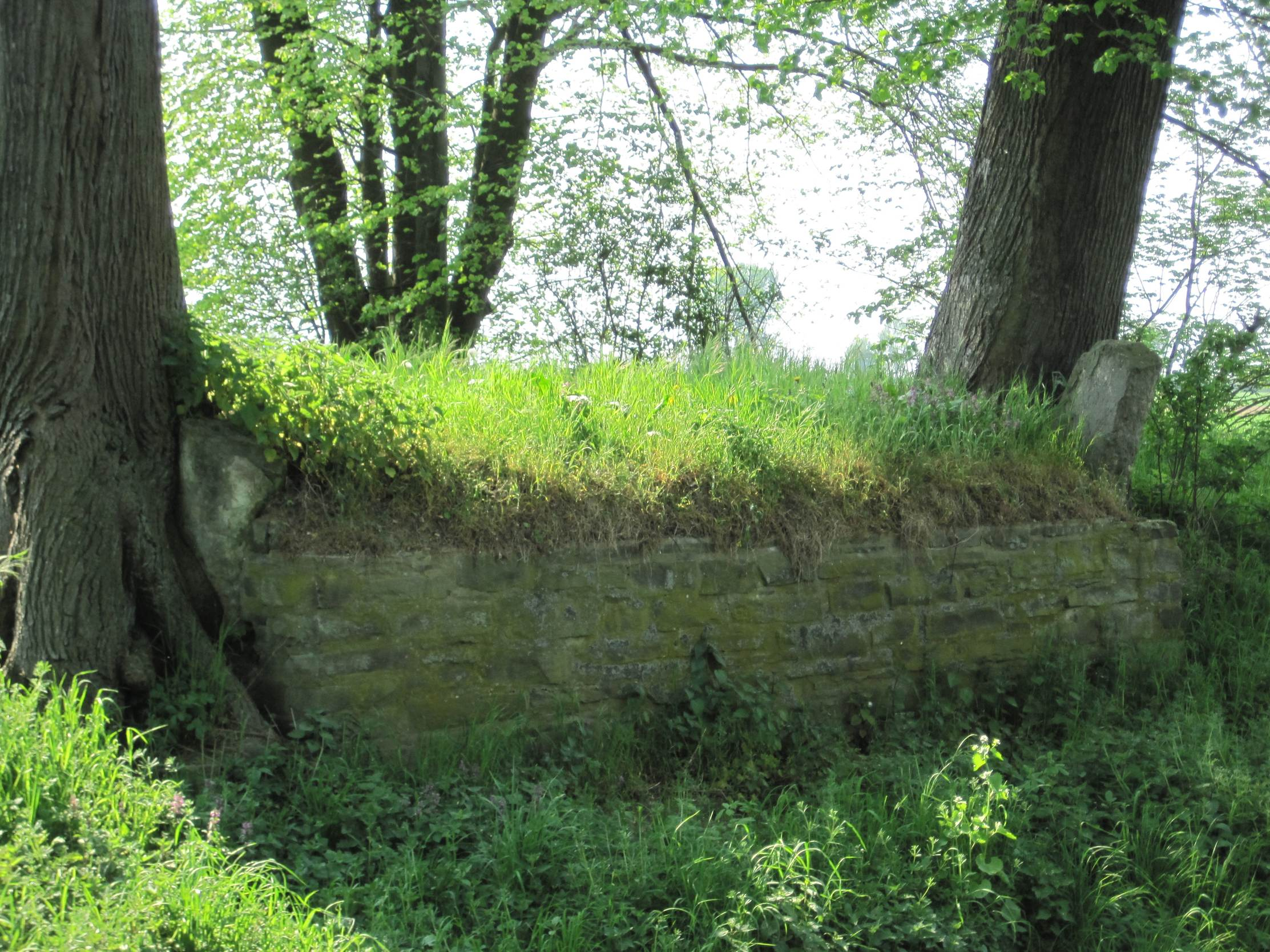
Remains of a Prussian bridge over the Swist at Miel

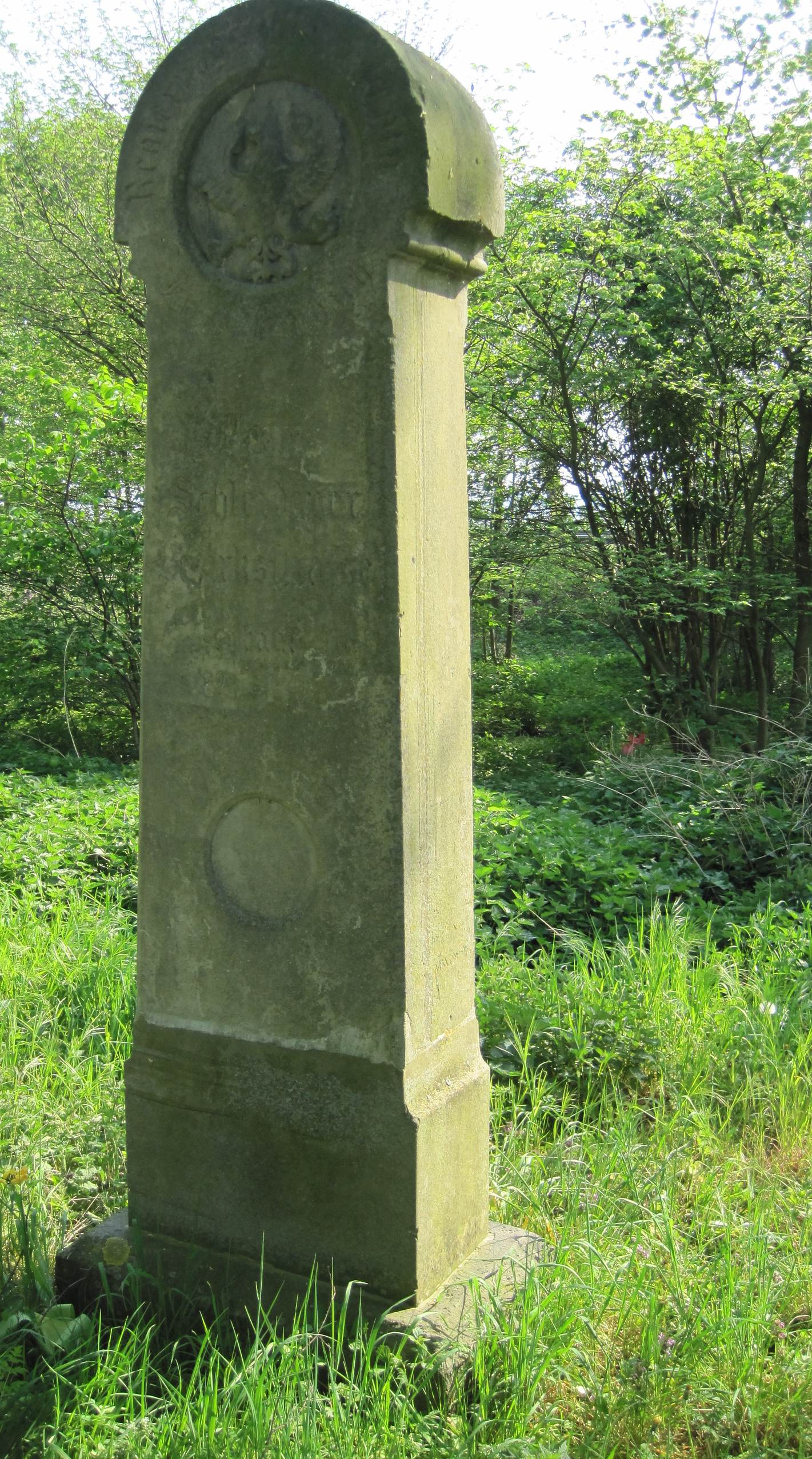
Prussian milestone by the old bridgehead near Miel

The Roman aqueduct to Cologne crossed the valley of the Swist between Meckenheim and Rheinbach on an arched bridge which was 1,400 metres long and up to 10 metres high. Archaeologists have worked out that the bridge must have once had 295 arches with an inside width of 3.56 metres (11.7 ft). Nothing is left of the structure apart from a low strip of rubble. In Lützermiel the foundations of a Prussian bridge have survived. The bridge once carried the district road (Bezirksstraße) from Bonn to Schleiden, built in 1823, over the Swist.

== See also ==
- List of rivers of North Rhine-Westphalia
- List of rivers of Rhineland-Palatinate
