= Voreifel =

Region of Germany

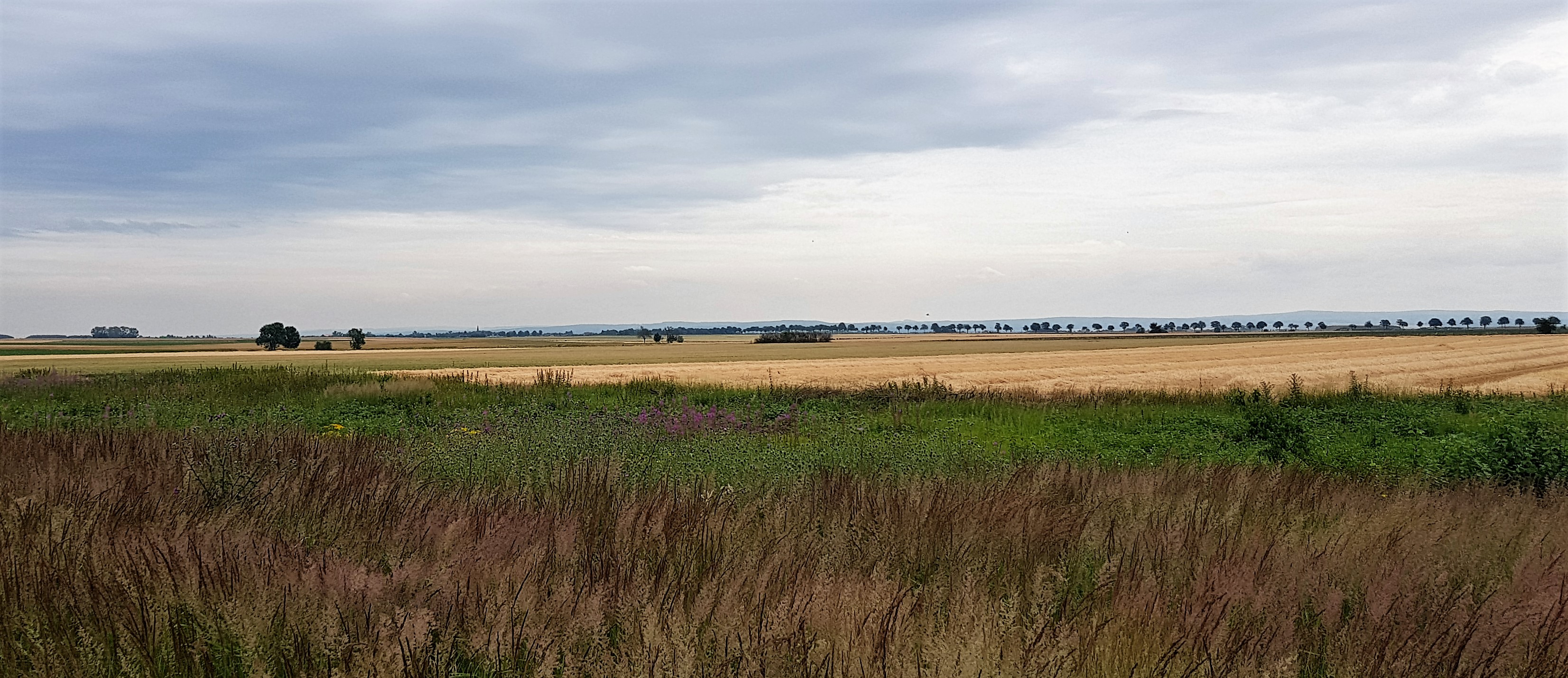
The landscape of the Voreifel near Weilerswist

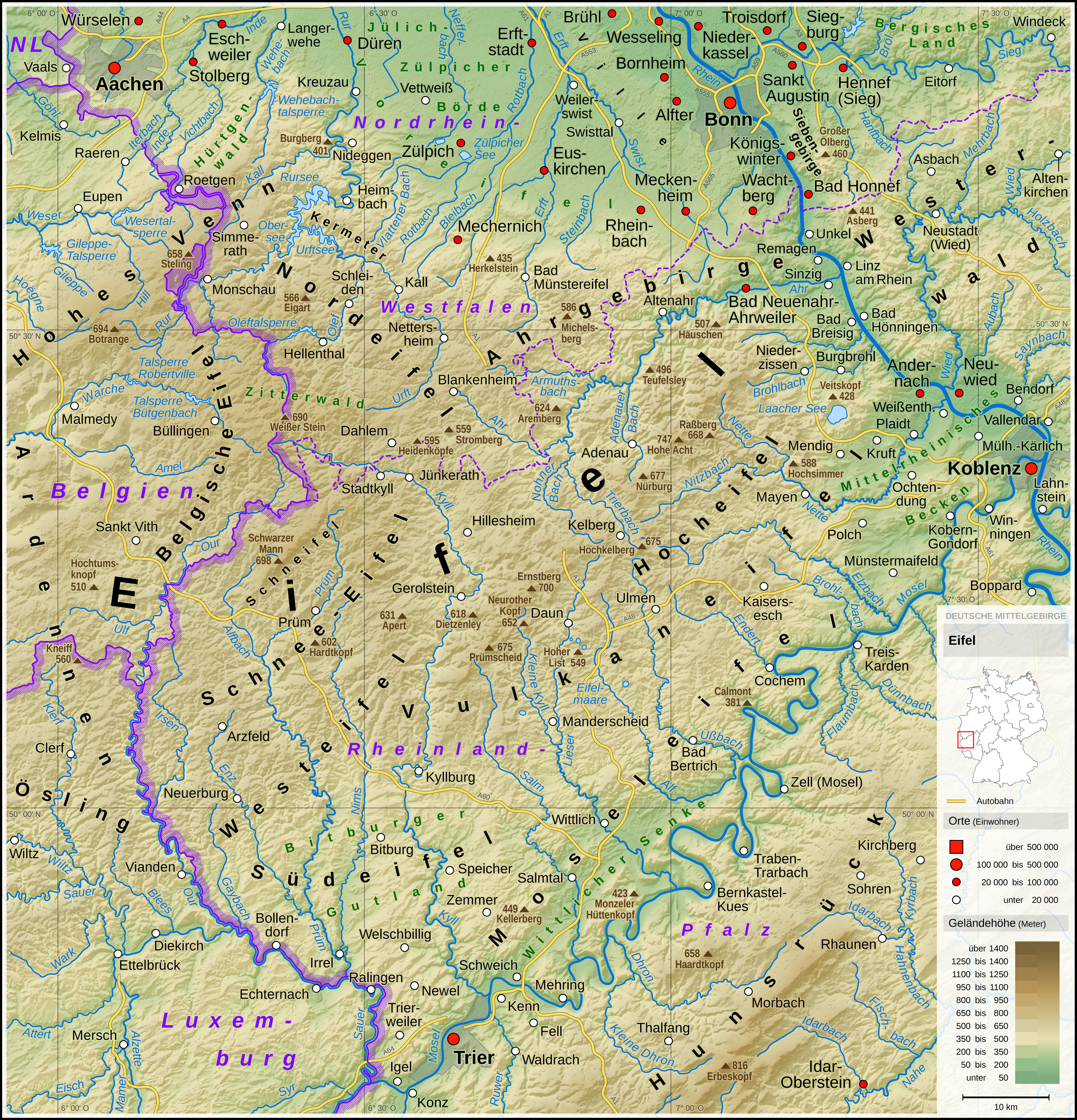
Map of the Eifel with the Voreifel bordering it to the north

The Voreifel ("Fore-Eifel" or "Pre-Eifel") is the name of a settlement area in the southern part of the German state of North Rhine-Westphalia. It is a term that grew out of the local speech.

The region of the Voreifel includes the towns and villages of Meckenheim, Rheinbach, Swisttal, the southern villages in Alfter, the western ones in Wachtberg and the northern villages of Grafschaft. Geographically it forms the southeastern foothills of the Zülpich Börde in the North Eifel, on the plateau between the rivers Ahr and Rhine. The landscape is defined by the wide valley of the Swist. To the east it is framed by the Kottenforst and Ville with the Rhineland Nature Park, to the west at the foot of the Eifel, the Rheinbach Forest and the Ahr Hills. To the southeast it transitions into the Drachenfelser Ländchen.
