= Ollheim =

Coordinates: 50°41′13″N 6°53′38″E

Map
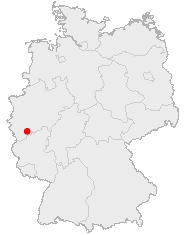

Ollheim is a farming village in the municipality Swisttal in the North Rhine-Westphalian Rhein-Sieg district. It is situated approximately 19 km west of Bonn. In 2007 it had 723 inhabitants.
