= Dünstekoven =

Small farming village in the North Rhine-Westphalian Rhein-Sieg district

Coordinates: 50°42′N 6°56′E

Map
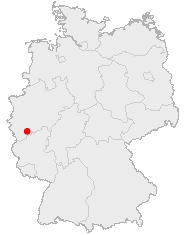

Dünstekoven is a small farming village in the municipality Swisttal in the North Rhine-Westphalian Rhein-Sieg district. It is situated approximately 20 km west of Bonn. In 2008 it had 620 inhabitants. Duenstekoven is located in the neighbourhood of Heimerzheim.
