= Buschhoven =

German farming village

Coordinates: 50°41′N 6°59′E

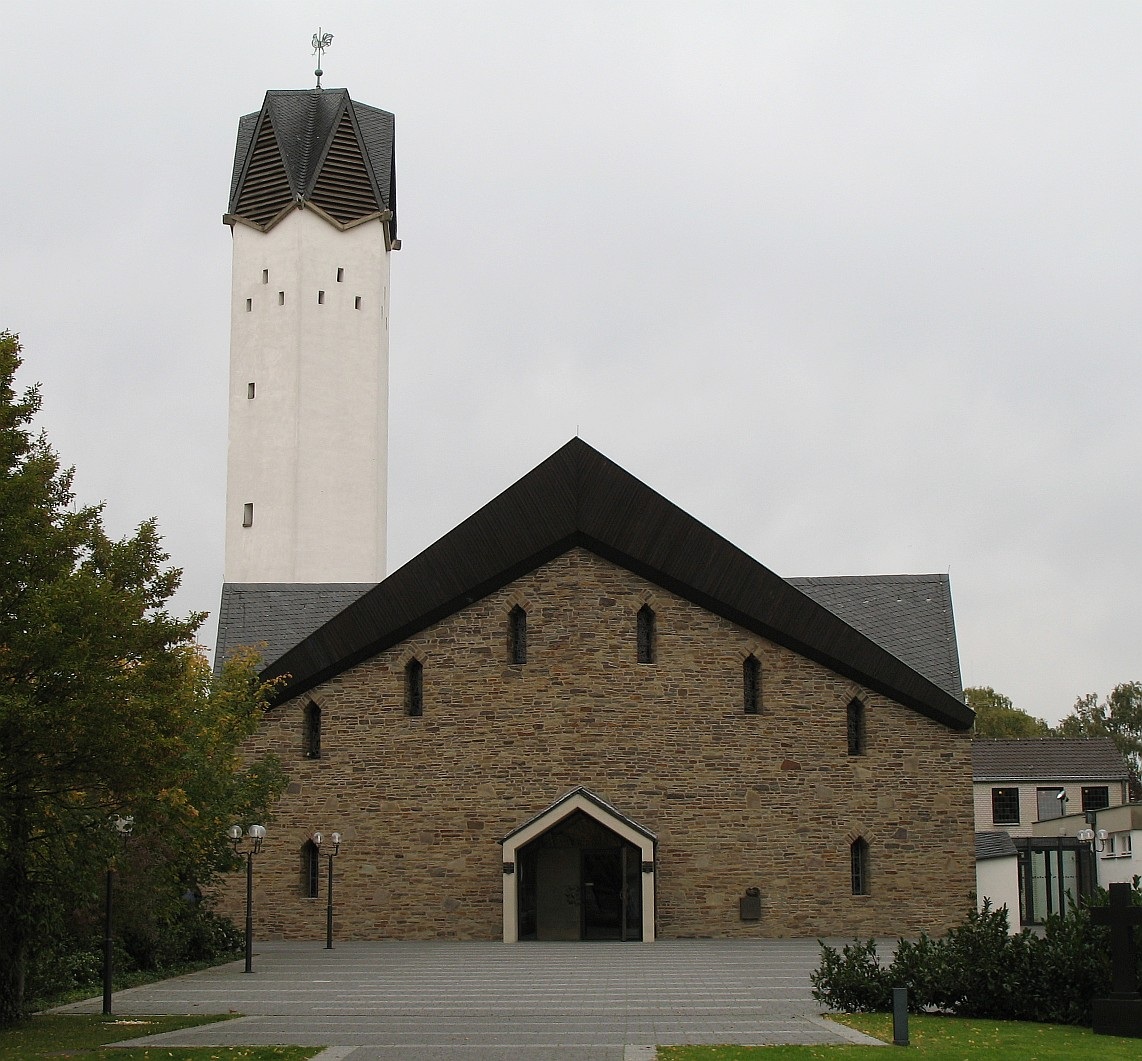
Parish and pilgrimage church St Catharina

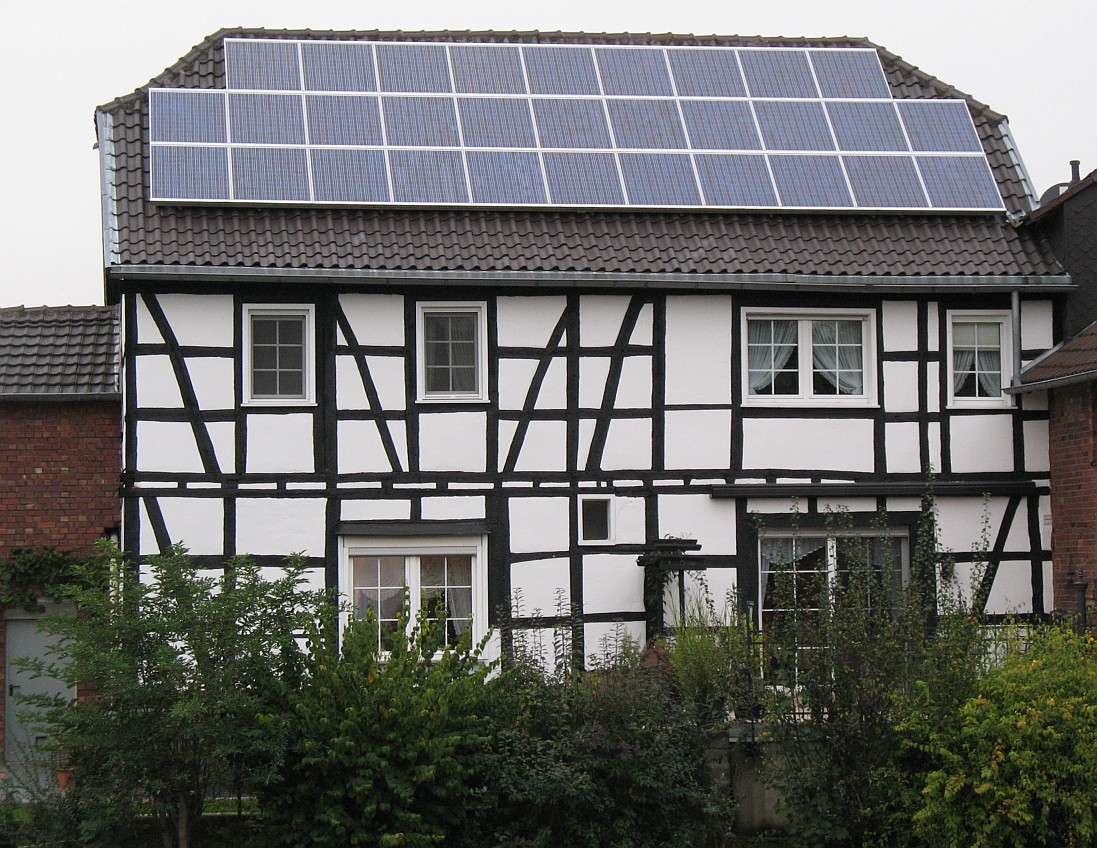
Old timber-framed house with a photovoltaic array

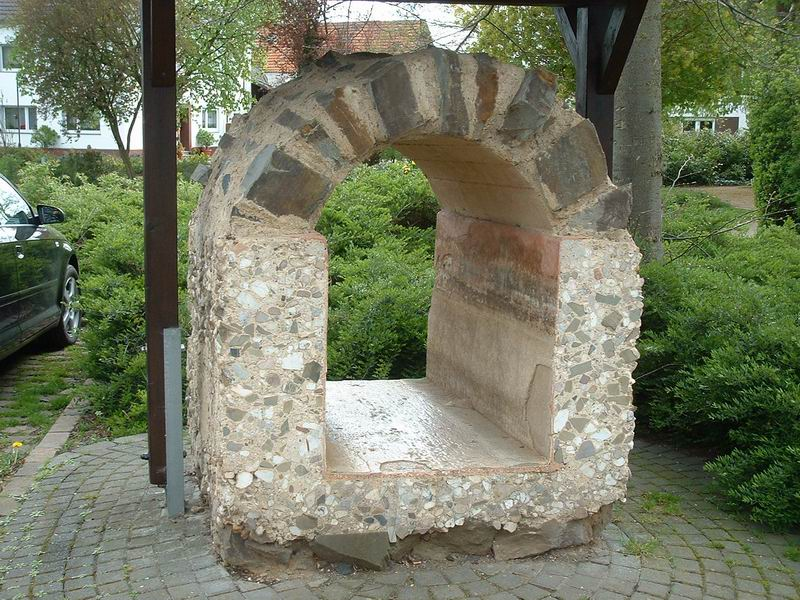
Remains of the Roman Eifel aqueduct

Buschhoven is a farming village 10 kilometres (6.2 mi) west of Bonn, Germany. It is part of the municipality Swisttal. It is surrounded by fields and various farms, with good transport links to the nearby main cities of Bonn and Cologne. There are seasonal carnivals in the area and religious festivals where the streets are decorated- it is known for its historic community feel.
