= Limescale =

Hard, chalky deposit of calcium carbonate

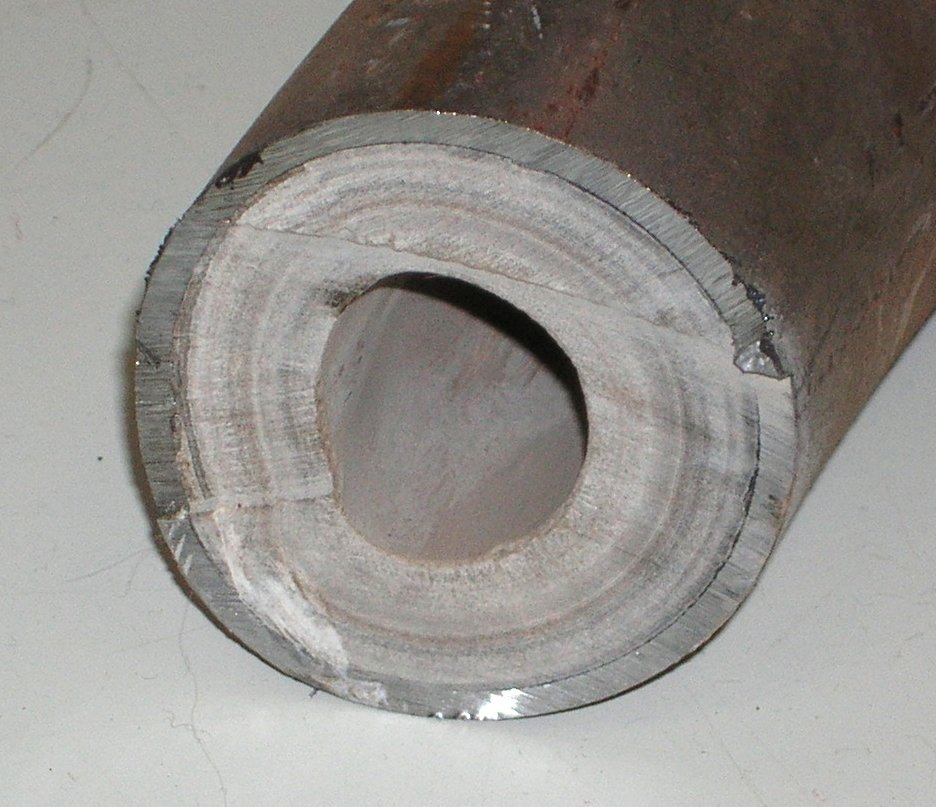
Limescale build-up inside a pipe reduces both liquid flow through the pipe and thermal conduction from the liquid to the outer pipe shell. Both effects will reduce the pipe's overall thermal efficiency in a heat exchanger.

Limescale is a hard, chalky deposit, consisting mainly of calcium carbonate (CaCO_{3}). It often builds up inside kettles, boilers, and pipework, especially those used for hot water since pipes containing hot water are usually the ones that come out of the boiler. It is also often found as a similar deposit on the inner surfaces of old pipes and other surfaces where hard water has flowed. Limescale also forms as travertine or tufa in hard water springs.

The colour varies from off-white through a range of greys and pink or reddish browns, depending on the other minerals present. Iron compounds give the reddish-browns.

In addition to being unsightly and hard to clean, limescale can seriously damage or impair the operation of various plumbing and heating components. Descaling agents are commonly used to remove limescale. Prevention of fouling by scale build-up relies on the technologies of water softening or other water treatment.

Limescale can also affect optic products, such as glasses and mirrors.

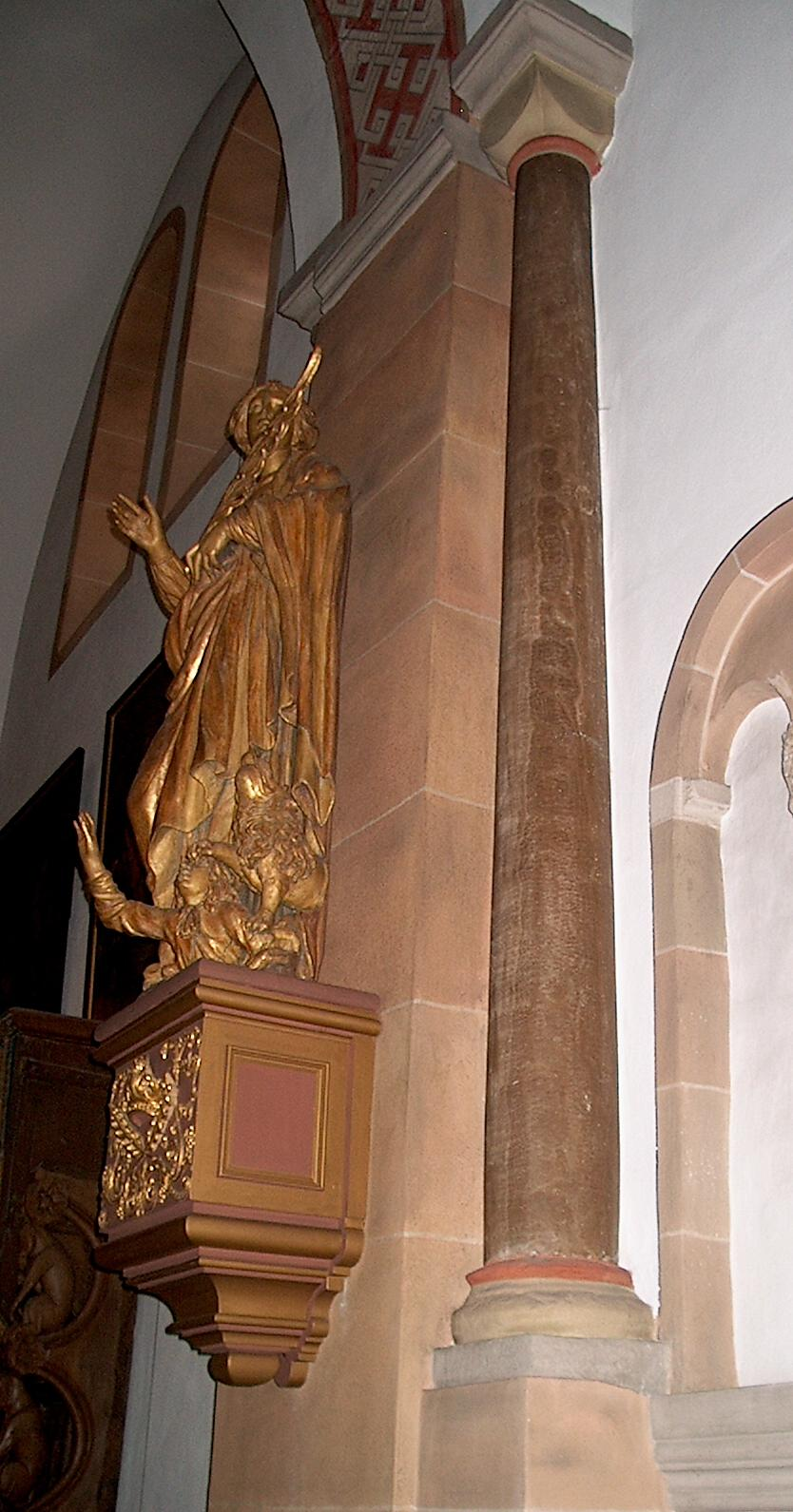
This column in the Bad Münstereifel church in Germany is made from the calcium carbonate deposits that built up in the Roman Eifel Aqueduct over several centuries of use.

== Chemical composition ==
The type found deposited on the heating elements of water heaters consists mainly of calcium carbonate (CaCO_{3}). Hard water contains calcium (and often magnesium) bicarbonate or similar ions. Calcium, magnesium, and carbonate ions dissolve from rocks through which rainwater percolates before collection. Calcium salts, such as calcium carbonate and calcium bicarbonate (Ca(HCO_{3})_{2}), are more soluble in hot water than cold water; thus, heating water alone does not cause calcium carbonate to precipitate. However, there is an equilibrium between dissolved calcium bicarbonate and dissolved calcium carbonate as represented by the chemical equation

Ca^{2+} + 2 HCO^{−}_{3} ⇌ Ca^{2+} + CO^{2−}_{3} + CO_{2} + H_{2}O

Note that CO_{2} is dissolved in the water. Carbon dioxide dissolved in water (aq) tends to equilibrate with carbon dioxide in the gaseous state (g):

CO_{2} (aq) ⇌ CO_{2} (g)

The equilibrium of CO_{2} moves to the right, toward gaseous CO_{2}, when water temperature rises or pressure falls. When water that contains dissolved calcium carbonate is warmed, CO_{2} leaves the water as gas, this reduces the amount involved in the reaction causing the equilibrium of bicarbonate and carbonate to re-balance to the right, increasing the concentration of dissolved carbonate. As the concentration of carbonate increases, calcium carbonate precipitates as the salt:

Ca^{2+} + CO^{2−}_{3} → CaCO_{3}

In pipes as limescale and in surface deposits of calcite as travertine or tufa the primary driver of calcite formation is the exsolution of gas. When heating hard water on a stove, these gas bubbles form on the surface of the pan prior to boiling. Gas exsolution can also occur when the confining pressure is released such as removing the top off a beer bottle or where subsurface water is flowed into an atmospheric pressure tank.

As new cold water with dissolved calcium carbonate/bicarbonate is added and heated, the process continues: CO_{2} gas is again removed, carbonate concentration increases, and more calcium carbonate precipitates.

Scale is often colored because of the presence of iron-containing compounds. The three main iron compounds are wüstite (FeO), hematite (Fe_{2}O_{3}), and magnetite (Fe_{3}O_{4}).

== As a stone ==
The Roman Eifel Aqueduct was completed around 80 AD and broken and largely destroyed by Germanic tribes in 260. By the Middle Ages the limestone-like limescale accretions from the inside of the aqueduct were particularly desirable as a building material, called "Eifel marble" in an area with little natural stone. In the course of operation of the aqueduct, many sections had a layer as thick as 20 centimetres (8 in). The material had a consistency similar to brown marble and was easily removable from the aqueduct. Upon polishing, it showed veins, and it could also be used like a stone board when cut flat. This artificial stone found use throughout the Rhineland and was very popular for columns, window frames, and even altars. Use of "Eifel marble" can be seen as far east as Paderborn and Hildesheim, where it was used in the cathedrals. Roskilde Cathedral in Denmark is the northernmost location of its use, where several gravestones are made of it.

Trade to the west took it to England as a high-status export material in the 11th and 12th centuries, where it was made into columns for a number of Norman English Cathedrals. The impressive polished brown stone was known for many years as 'Onyx Marble'. Its origin and nature was a mystery to people studying the stonework at Canterbury Cathedral, until its source was identified in 2011. It is used there as columns supporting the cloister roof, alternating with columns of Purbeck Marble. These large cathedral cloisters needed several hundred such columns around an open quadrangle, which must have been supplied by a well-organized extraction and transport operation. The Eifel deposits, now called Calcareous sinter or calc-sinter (since it is neither onyx nor marble), have also been identified at Rochester and in the now lost Romanesque cloister at Norwich as well as the Infirmary Cloisters, Chapter House windows, and Treasury doorway at Canterbury.

== Related material ==
Soap scum forms when calcium cations from hard water combine with soap, which would dissolve in soft water. This precipitates out in a thin film on the interior surfaces of baths, sinks, and drainage pipes.

== Gallery ==
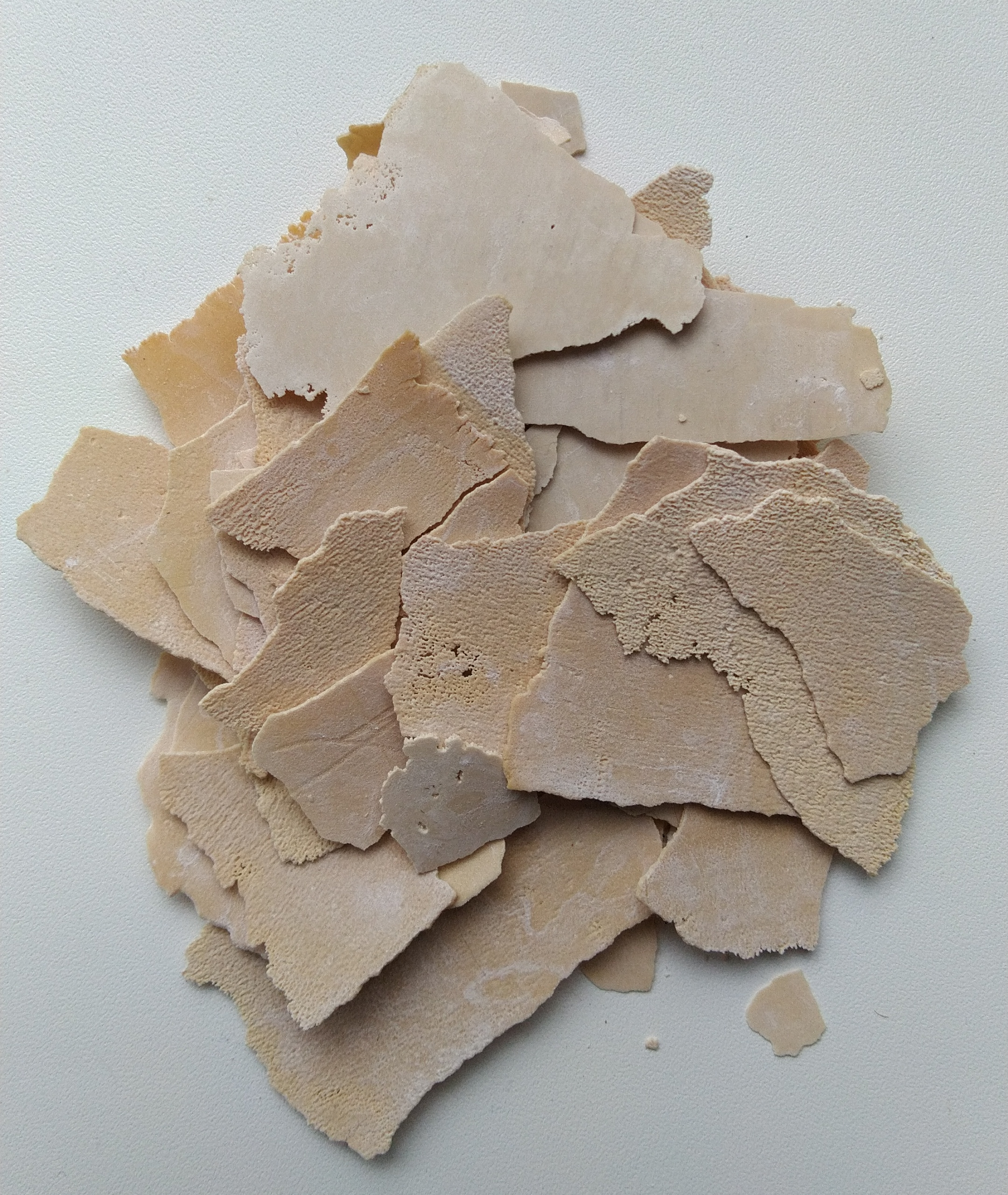
Several large pieces of limescale removed from an electric kettle.

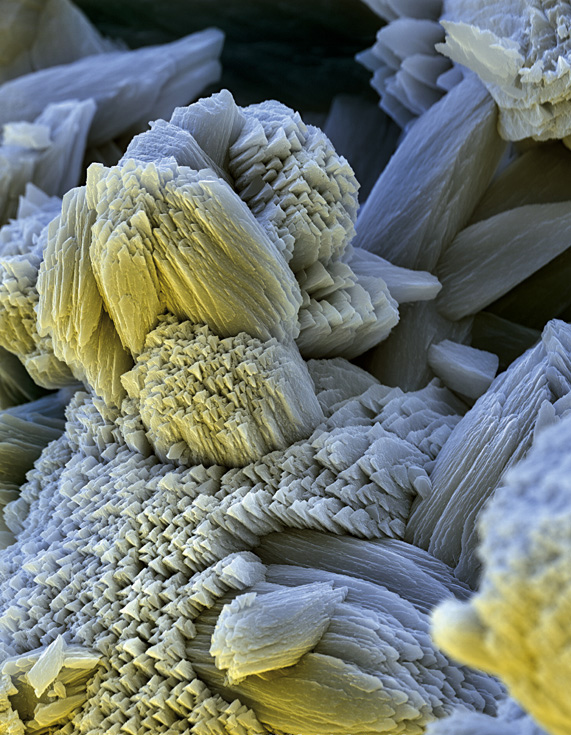
A scanning electron micrograph of limescale (The field of view is 64 × 90 μm).

== See also ==
- Fouling
- Hard water
- Limestone
- Water softening
