= Straßfeld =

Coordinates: 50°42′N 6°52′E

Map
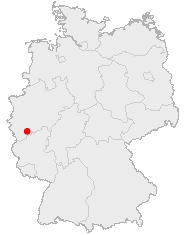

Straßfeld is a village in the municipality Swisttal in the North Rhine-Westphalian Rhein-Sieg district. It is situated approximately 24 km west of Bonn. In 2007 it had 465 inhabitants.
