= Calcareous sinter =

Freshwater calcium carbonate deposit

Calcareous sinter is a freshwater calcium carbonate deposit, also known as calc-sinter. Deposits are characterised by low porosity and well-developed lamination, often forming crusts or sedimentary rock layers. Calcareous sinter should not be confused with siliceous sinter, which the term sinter more frequently refers to. It has been suggested that the term "sinter" should be restricted to siliceous spring deposits and be dropped for calcareous deposits entirely.

== Features ==
Calcareous sinter is characterised by laminations of prismatic crystals growing perpendicular to the substrate; laminations are separated by thin layers of microcrystalline carbonate. Calcareous sinter is porous due to the calcareous crystals enclosing many small cavities. Macrophytes are absent, consequently porosity is very low. Exclusion of species is due either to high temperature (travertine), high pH/ionic strength (tufa) or absence of light (speleothems).

Pedley (1990) suggests the term be abandoned in favour of tufa for ambient temperature deposits. This avoids any potential confusion with siliceous sinter and prevents deposits formed in different environmental conditions (hot spring deposits, cold spring deposits and speleothems are all lumped together under the term sinter) from being amalgamated into one group.

== Geochemistry ==
Deposits are formed from either calcite or aragonite. Precipitation is brought about by degassing of CO_{2}, which decreases the solubility of calcite/aragonite. (See tufa/geochemistry)

== Notable deposits ==
- Pamukkale, Turkey – terraces of travertine.
- Mono Lake, California - towers of tufa.

== Gallery ==
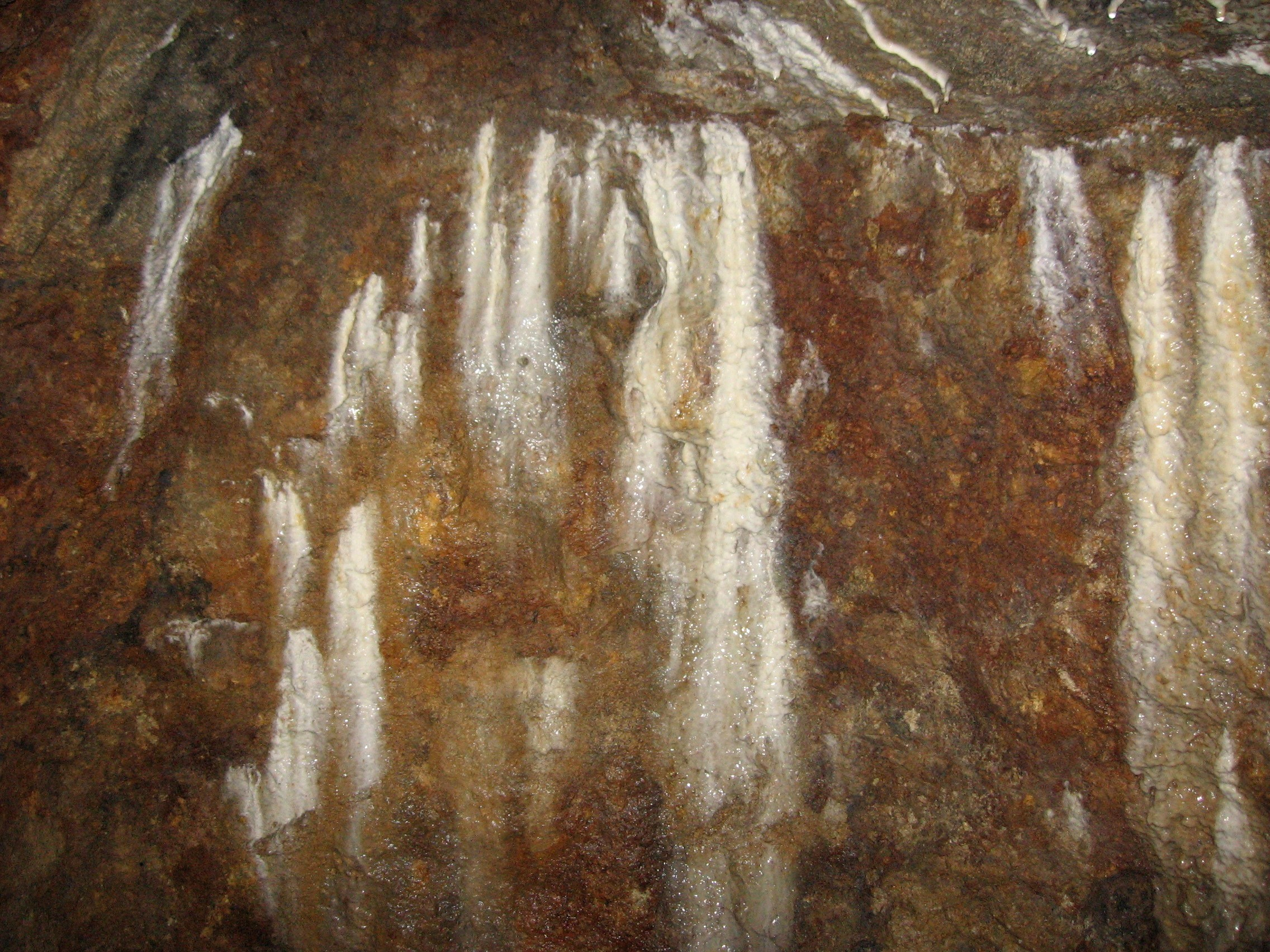
Pure calc sinter, typical for aqueducts and all kinds of water facilities.

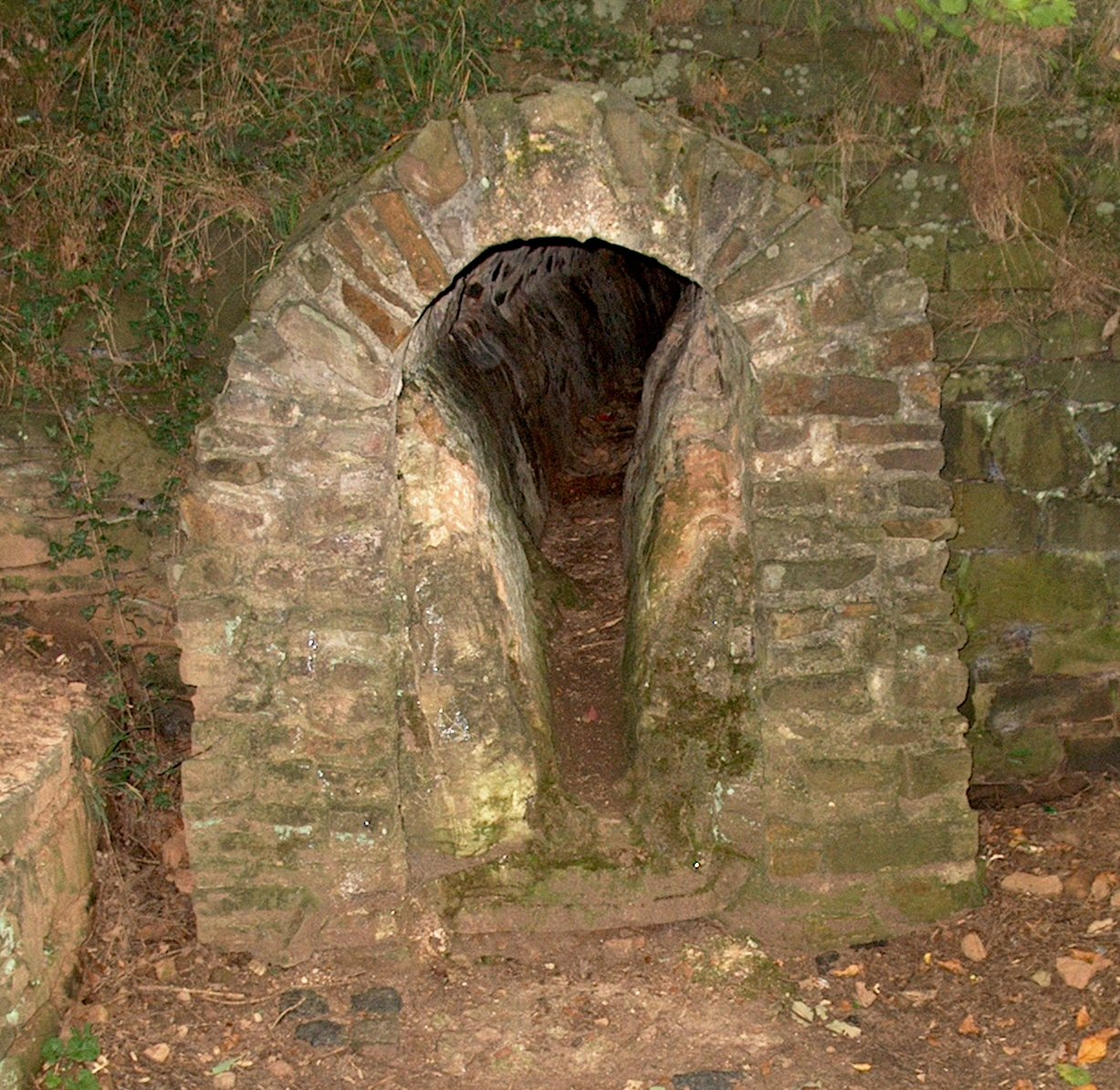
Roman aqueduct in Germania Inferior. Eifel Aqueduct, clogged by fine sinter.

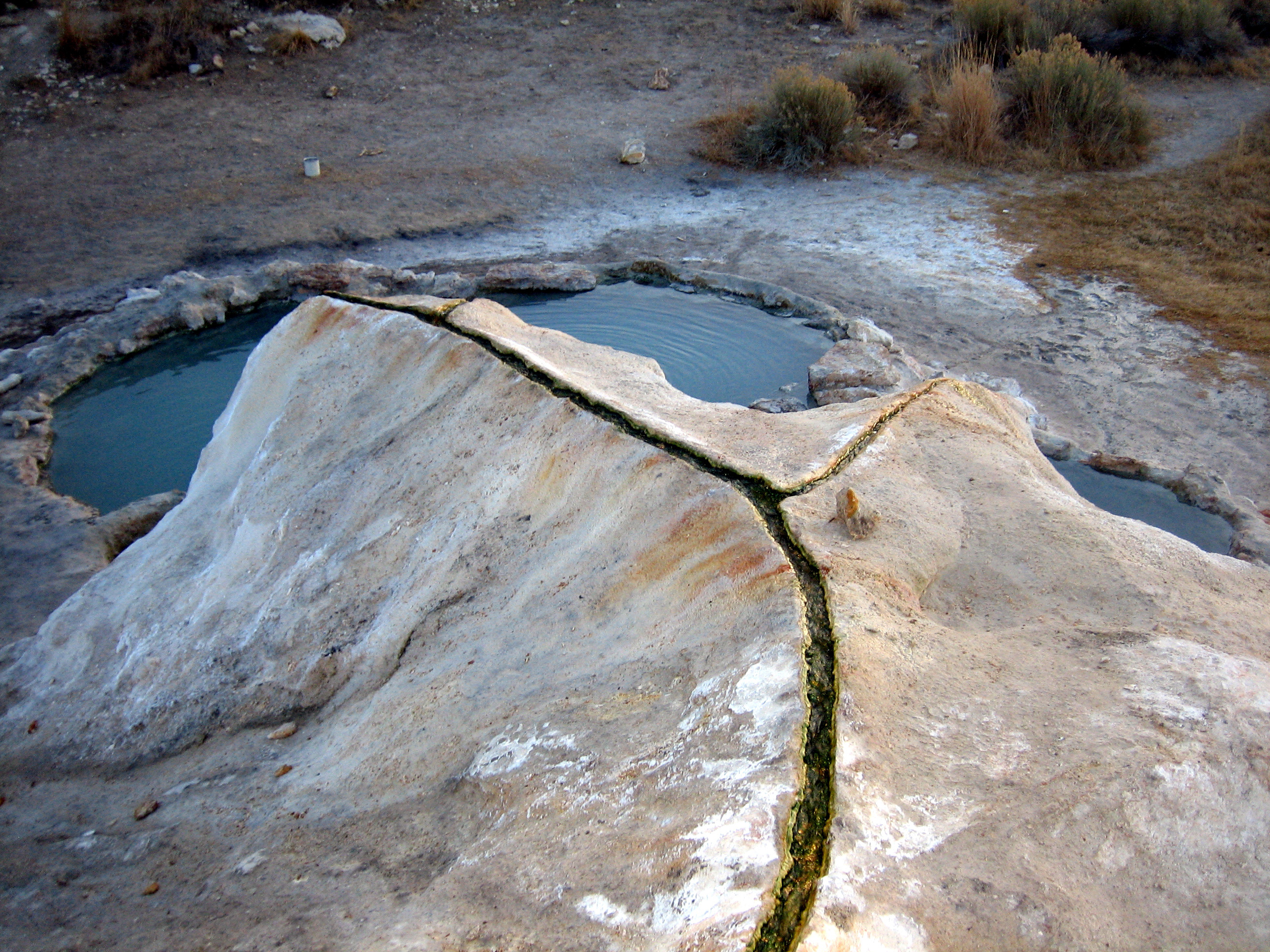
Deposits of several thousand years of calc sinter (travertine) in the Bridgeport, California Hot Springs

== Medieval extraction and use ==
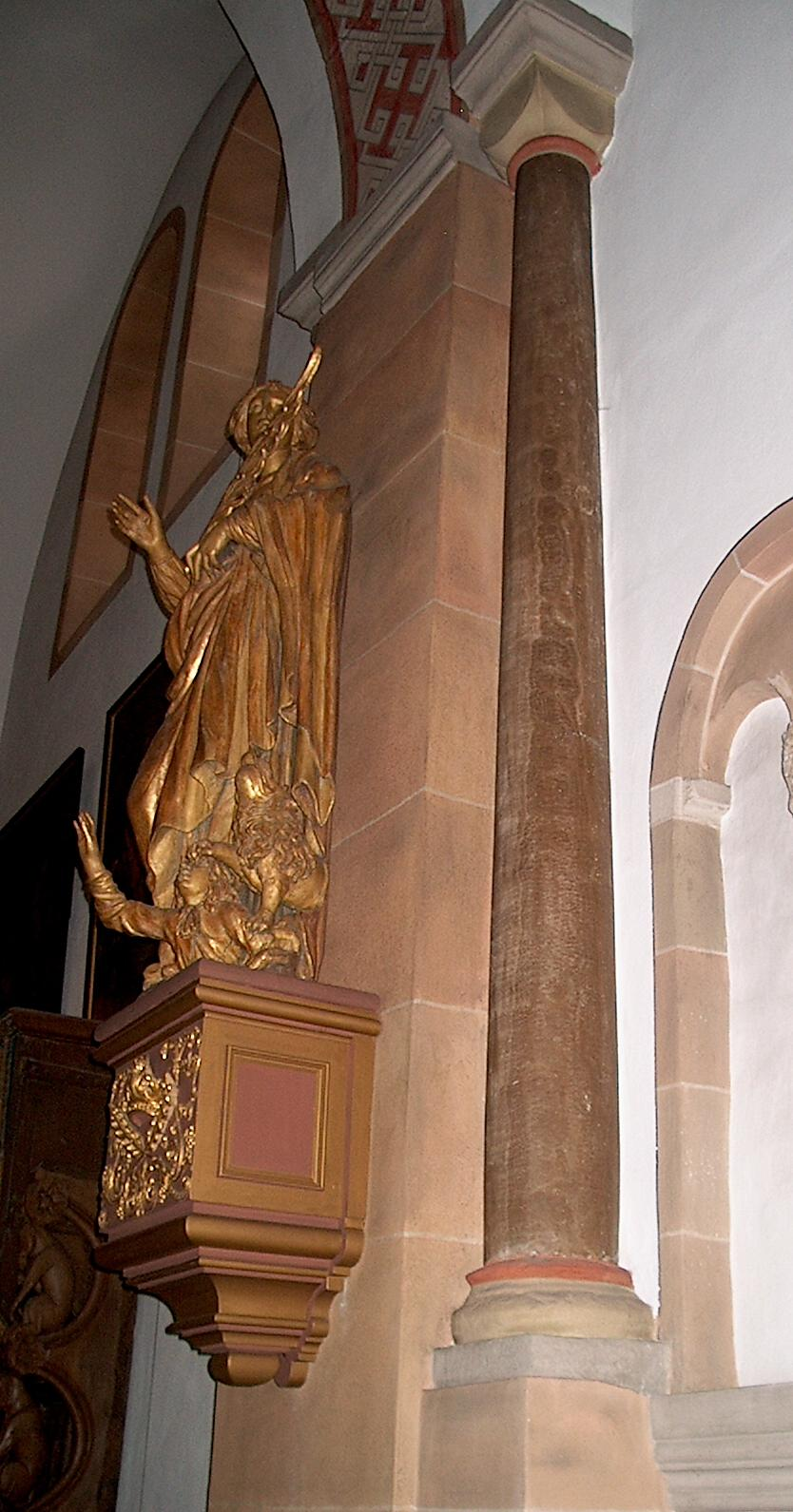
Column of calc-sinter from the Eifel Aqueduct in Bad Münstereifel church in Germany

The build-up of calc-sinter material in the Eifel Aqueduct was commercially exploited in the 11th and 12th centuries. With deposits up to 30 centimetres (12 in) thick, the material was cut into vertical columns of polished brown rock with impressive layered patterns, which made it much in demand by cathedral builders across large parts of central Europe and beyond. In England it was used to provide polychromy, contrasting with the pale limestone favoured by Norman English Cathedrals. The stone was for many years known as 'Onyx Marble' despite being very obviously neither onyx nor marble. Those studying the stonework at Canterbury Cathedral were unaware of its origins in the aqueduct until 2011. Such large-scale use as the cloisters around a cathedral quadrangle needed many hundreds of columns, which must have been supplied by a well-organised extraction and transport operation. The Eifel deposits have also been identified at Rochester and in the now lost Romanesque cloister at Norwich as well as the Infirmary Cloister, Chapter House windows, Anselm Chapel door and the Treasury gateway at Canterbury.

== See also ==
- Petrifying well
