= Morenhoven =

Coordinates: 50°40′N 6°57′E

Map
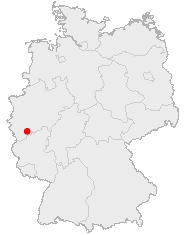

Morenhoven is a farming village in the municipality of Swisttal in the North Rhine-Westphalian Rhein-Sieg district. It is situated approximately 12 km west of Bonn. In 2007, it had 1,650 inhabitants.
