= Miel (Swisttal) =

Coordinates: 50°40′13″N 6°54′54″E

Map
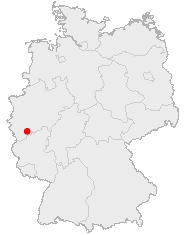

Miel is a farming village in the municipality Swisttal in the North Rhine-Westphalian Rhein-Sieg district. It is situated approximately 16 km southwest of Bonn. In 2007 it had 1072 inhabitants.
