= Alfter =

- Municipality
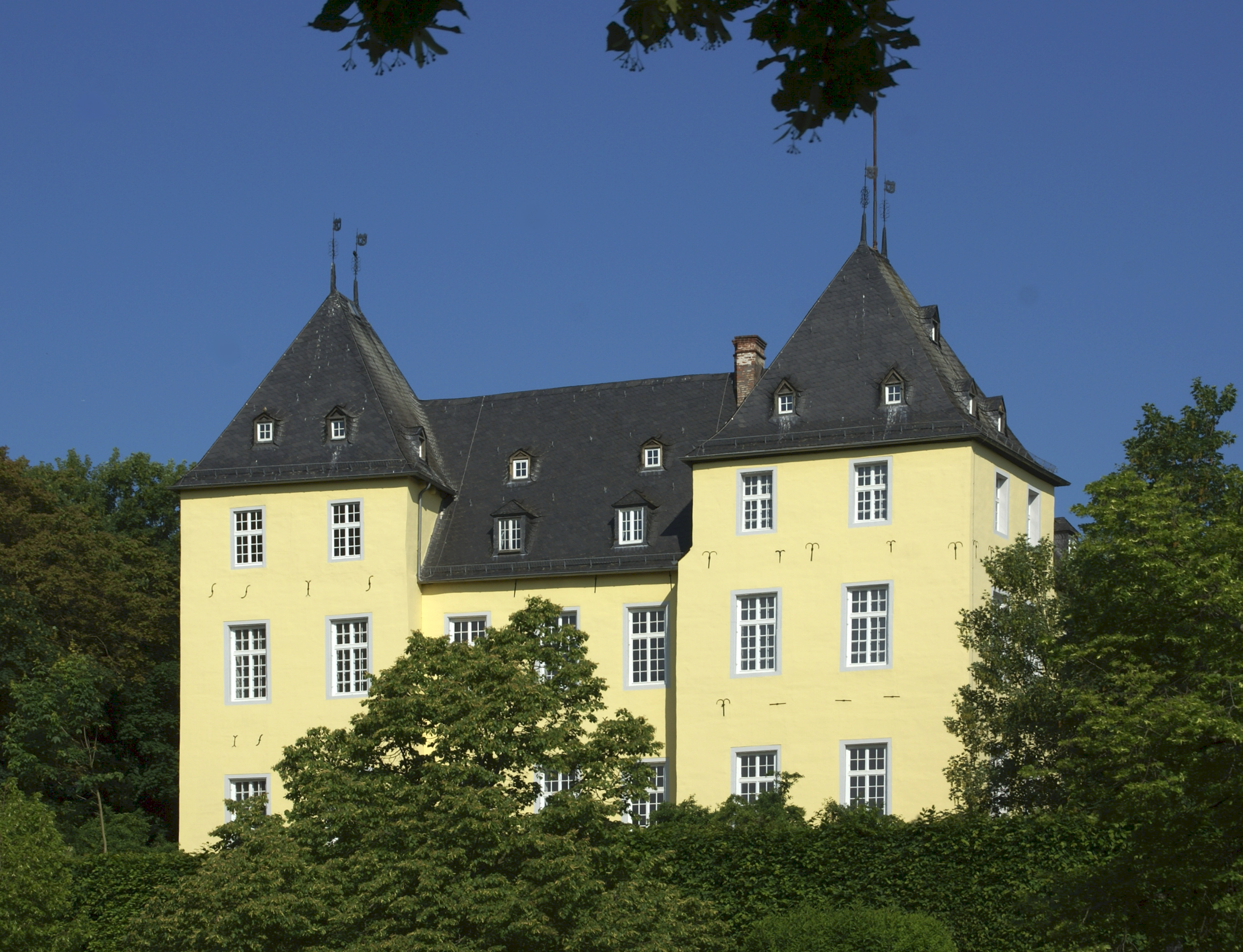
- Alfter Castle in Alfter

- Coat of arms

- Location of Alfter within Rhein-Sieg-Kreis district
- Interactive map of Alfter
- Location within Germany Location within North Rhine-Westphalia
- Coordinates: 50°44′08″N 07°00′33″E
- Country: Germany
- State: North Rhine-Westphalia
- Admin. region: Köln
- District: Rhein-Sieg-Kreis

Government
  - Mayor (2020–25): Rolf Schumacher (CDU)

Area
  - Total: 34.77 km^{2} (13.42 sq mi)
- Elevation: 76 m (249 ft)

Population (2025-12-31)
  - Total: 23,766
  - Density: 683.5/km^{2} (1,770/sq mi)
- Time zone: UTC+01:00 (CET)
  - Summer (DST): UTC+02:00 (CEST)
- Postal codes: 53347
- Dialling codes: 02222, 0228
- Vehicle registration: SU
- Website: www.alfter.de

Alfter (German pronunciation: [ˈalftɐ]; Kölsch: Alefte) is a municipality in the Rhein-Sieg district, in North Rhine-Westphalia, Germany. It is situated approximately 6 km west of Bonn.

== Geography ==
The community of Alfter lies west of the former German capital Bonn, on the southern ridge of the "Vorgebirge". It borders on the city of Bornheim to the north, Bonn to the east, the cities of Meckenheim and Rheinbach to the south and the community of Swisttal to the west. Alfter consists of a total area of 35 km², of which 18 km² is used for agricultural purposes and 8 km² is forest.

== Population ==
Historical population

Year	Pop.	±% p.a.
1965	13,581	—
1970	14,651	+1.53%
1975	16,008	+1.79%
1980	16,276	+0.33%
1985	16,411	+0.17%
1990	17,677	+1.50%
1995	19,351	+1.83%

Year	Pop.	±% p.a.
2000	20,907	+1.56%
2005	22,569	+1.54%
2010	22,820	+0.22%
2015	23,435	+0.53%
2020	23,467	+0.03%
2025	23,766	+0.25%

Source: Landesdatabank Nordrhein-Westfalen
