= Meckenheim =

- Town
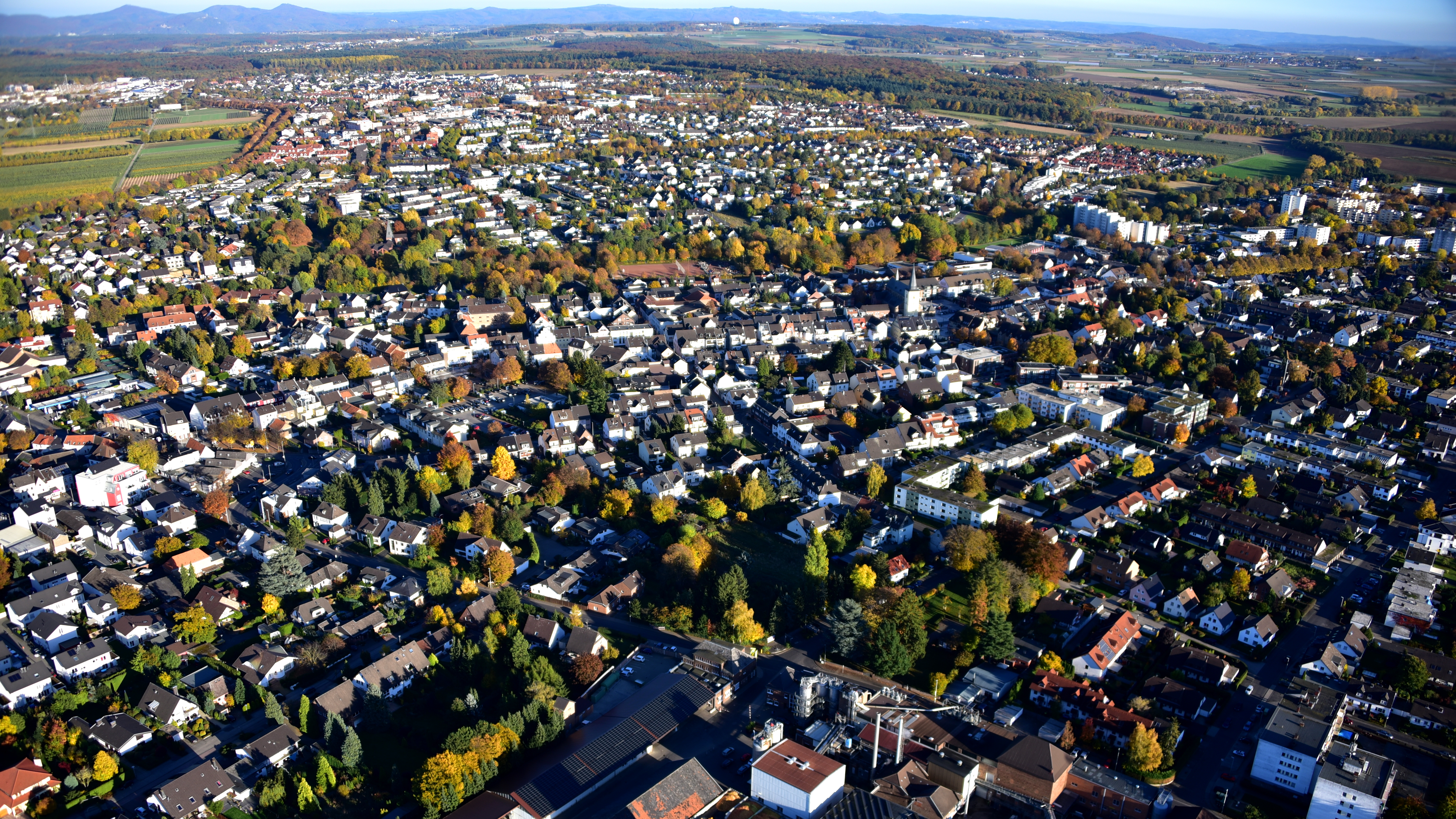
- Aerial view

- Coat of arms

- Location of Meckenheim within Rhein-Sieg-Kreis district
- Interactive map of Meckenheim
- Location within Germany Location within North Rhine-Westphalia
- Coordinates: 50°38′N 7°01′E
- Country: Germany
- State: North Rhine-Westphalia
- Admin. region: Köln
- District: Rhein-Sieg-Kreis
- Subdivisions: 5

Government
  - Mayor (2020–25): Holger Jung (CDU)

Area
  - Total: 34.84 km^{2} (13.45 sq mi)
- Elevation: 180 m (590 ft)

Population (2025-12-31)
  - Total: 24,936
  - Density: 715.7/km^{2} (1,854/sq mi)
- Time zone: UTC+01:00 (CET)
  - Summer (DST): UTC+02:00 (CEST)
- Postal codes: 53340, 53333
- Dialling codes: 02225
- Vehicle registration: SU
- Website: www.meckenheim.de

Meckenheim (German pronunciation: [ˈmɛkn̩haɪm]; Kölsch: Meckem) is a town in the Rhein-Sieg district, in North Rhine-Westphalia, Germany.

== Geography ==
=== Geographical situation ===
Meckenheim is situated approximately 15 km south-west of Bonn and separated from the German former capital (1949–1990) and seat of government (1949–1999) by the Kottenforst forest in the southernmost part of the Cologne Lowland. The highest point in the municipality is at 386.1 m above sea level near the village of Ersdorf at the beginning of the Eifel (also known as the Voreifel) while its lowest point is where the Swist leaves the municipal area to the northwest at 159.5 m above sea level.

The North Rhine-Westphalian town borders (clockwise) on Alfter, Bonn, Wachtberg, Grafschaft and Rheinbach, whereby Alfter, Wachtberg and Rheinbach, like Meckenheim itself, belong to the Rhein-Sieg district; Grafschaft is in the district of Ahrweiler, which already belongs to Rhineland-Palatinate.

The total area of the city is 34.8 km², with a maximum north-south extension of 11 km and a maximum west-east extension of 5.5 km. Of this area, approx. 1500 ha are used as residential areas, 565 ha as farm and building areas, 570 ha as areas for other uses, 614 ha as garden land, 1324 ha as agricultural land and 1070 ha as arable land. The remaining area is mainly divided between grassland, forests and smaller areas of water.

A total of 8.5 km of motorway, 23 km of country roads and 8 km of district roads run through the municipality. In addition, 115 km of municipal roads and 140 km of agricultural roads run through the town of Meckenheim.

=== City structure ===
Meckenheim consists of five city districts, (Alt-)Meckenheim, with the oldest part along the Swist and the "Neuer Markt" area (17,348 inhabitants), Altendorf (1,310), Ersdorf (927), Lüftelberg (1,355) and Merl (6,007).

== Population ==
Historical population

Year	Pop.	±% p.a.
1965	6,380	—
1970	8,883	+6.84%
1975	11,638	+5.55%
1980	16,746	+7.55%
1985	19,898	+3.51%
1990	22,814	+2.77%
1995	24,558	+1.48%

Year	Pop.	±% p.a.
2000	25,319	+0.61%
2005	25,142	−0.14%
2010	24,241	−0.73%
2015	24,357	+0.10%
2020	24,741	+0.31%
2025	24,936	+0.16%

Source: Landesdatabank Nordrhein-Westfalen

As of 8 September 2023, Meckenheim had 27,076 inhabitants, 1404 of whom were secondary residents. 9172 inhabitants (33.9%) were over 60 years old, 4758 inhabitants (17.6%) were under 18 years old. The residents lived in a total of 16,147 households.

A total of 1098 primary school pupils, 316 lower secondary school pupils, 613 intermediate secondary school pupils and 774 grammar school pupils attended schools in the town.

== History ==
The area around Meckenheim was already settled in the Neolithic Age. At the time of the Roman occupation of the Rhine region, an aqueduct from the Eifel to Cologne ran through the district of today's Lüftelberg. The area around Meckenheim was probably settled by the Franks in the 5th century AD, which is still reflected today in the syllables -heim and -dorf in the names of the city and its neighbouring villages. Over 300 graves from this period have been uncovered and analysed. The first documented mention dates back to 853 AD, when the property was transferred to the Cassius Monastery in Bonn.

Initially, Meckenheim was located exclusively around the Swist river, the area between Meckenheim and Merl was not or only sparsely populated. Meckenheim was granted town privileges on July 28, 1636 by Prince-elector Ferdinand of Bavaria, the Archbishop of Cologne at the time; at this time, Meckenheim belonged to the secular domain of the archbishopric, known as the Electorate of Cologne (Kurköln). On March 28, 1787, a major fire destroyed almost the entire town, which at that time had between 550 (around 1700) and 1100 (1812) inhabitants.

When the French invaded the Rhineland during the French Revolutionary Wars following the French Revolution, Meckenheim became part of France in 1794 and lost its town privileges. At this time, Meckenheim was part of the Mairie Adendorf in the Kanton Rheinbach, which was part of the Arrondissement de Bonn in the Département de Rhin-et-Moselle. In 1815, after the German campaign of 1813, the Rhineland, and with it Meckenheim, became part of Prussia (Rhine Province) as a result of the Congress of Vienna. It was not until 1929 that Meckenheim regained the right to call itself a town (Landgemeinde Stadt Meckenheim) again.

During the Second World War, Meckenheim was spared destruction for a long time; it was not until March 1945 that there was fighting and shelling in the town and the surrounding area. On March 6, 1945, American troops occupied the town, and a day later, on March 7, they were able to take the bridge at Remagen during an 18-day-battle and thus conquer a path across the Rhine, which was actually only planned as part of a larger offensive further downstream near Wesel on the Lower Rhine during Operation Plunder.

After the war, Meckenheim had around 2,500 inhabitants in 1950, and Bonn's election as the federal capital in 1949 (also referred to as Bonn Republic) meant that more housing had to be built in the town to accommodate all the civil servants. To this end, Meckenheim, the previously independent Merl and the city of Bonn joined forces and founded a development company that was tasked with planning new residential areas. This also led to the previously vacant site between Meckenheim and Merl now being built on with apartments and a shopping area known as the "Neuer Markt". In the decades from 1960 to the present day, Meckenheim's population has increased almost tenfold.

In 1969, a municipal reorganization was also carried out with the Bonn Act (formally Gesetz zur kommunalen Neugliederung des Raumes Bonn, abbreviated as the "Bonn-Gesetz"). Until 1969, the town of Meckenheim, together with Adendorf, Groß-Altendorf, Arzdorf, Ersdorf, Fritzdorf, Lüftelberg and Merl, belonged to the so-called Amt Meckenheim; from 1969, a new town of Meckenheim was created from the parts of Altendorf, Ersdorf, Lüftelberg, Merl and Meckenheim itself, which now also belongs to the newly founded Rhein-Sieg district. Adendorf, Arzdorf and Fritzdorf were transferred to the newly founded municipality of Wachtberg. To this day, however, the three towns that now belong to Wachtberg have retained the "old Meckenheim dialling code" 02225.

Even after the federal government moved from Bonn to Berlin in 1999 as a result of the Decision on the Capital of Germany, many jobs remained in Bonn (including at Deutsche Telekom and Deutsche Post), meaning that Meckenheim is still very popular as a residential town. As of February 2023, three new development areas are actively planned for new detached houses and apartment blocks.

== Sister cities ==
Meckenheim has two Sister cities, Le Mée-sur-Seine, Île-de-France, France and Bernau bei Berlin, Brandenburg, Germany.

== Politics ==
Distribution of seats in the city council (as of April 3rd 2025)
Total 46 seats
- Christian Democratic Union of Germany: 20
- SPD: 8
- Greens: 8
- Free Democratic Party (Germany): 2
- UWG: 3
- BfM: 4
- Independent politician: 1

=== Current politics ===
Politics in Meckenheim is shaped by a mayor and the town council, both of whom are in accordance with the laws of the state of North Rhine-Westphalia elected for five years. Holger Jung (Christian Democratic Union of Germany) has been mayor since the 2020 municipal elections. The town council consists of 46 seats and is made up of parliamentary groups from the CDU, Social Democratic Party of Germany, Alliance 90/The Greens, Free Democratic Party (Germany), Independent Voters' Association (Unabhängige Wählergemeinschaft, UWG) and Citizens for Meckenheim (Bürger für Meckenheim, BfM), as well as one independent Council Member.

The next local elections in Northrhine-Westphalia, and therefore also elections for the city council and mayor, will probably take place in 2025.

=== Voting out the mayor ===
In 2007, an unusual event took place when the incumbent mayor Yvonne Kempen (1960–2011, CDU) was voted out of office by the town council. Kempen had been elected for the first time in 1999 and confirmed in office in 2004, but over the years had fallen out with the town council, the district administrator of the Rhein-Sieg district and the district government of the administrative district of Cologne (Regierungsbezirk Köln) over various issues and had also taken legal action against these people in some cases; cooperation between Kempen and the superior authorities, which was necessary in many cases, was then no longer or only possible with difficulty. After the vote-out, early elections were held in March 2008.

== Infrastructure ==
Meckenheim is located directly near the interchange of Bundesautobahn 61 and 565 and is also connected to the Voreifelbahn. BAB 565 connects Meckenheim directly to Bonn and via the Bundesautobahn 555 to the western and Bundesautobahn 59 to the eastern parts of Cologne. The Meckenheim-Nord (10) and Merl (11) exits lead from the BAB 565 towards the town, from BAB 61 it can be accessed from the west via Rheinbach (28). At the end of the BAB 565 at the Meckenheim junction, it merges into the Bundesstraße 257, which connects the area with the Eifel and the Nürburgring.

Railroad stops of the Voreifelbahn are at Kottenforst, Meckenheim Industriepark and Meckenheim and connects the town to Rheinbach and Euskirchen to the west and Bonn to the east. Bonn Hauptbahnhof is a stop for long-distance trains heading north (Cologne, Ruhr) and south (Koblenz, Frankfurt Rhine-Main).

The nearest airport is Cologne Bonn Airport.

== Companies and authorities ==
Meckenheim is home to several companies and authorities. Since the 1970s, for example, a branch office of the Federal Criminal Police Office has been located in Merl, which is responsible for state security (for example, crimes against politicians or with a political background) and cybercrime. The Bundeswehr's IT service provider, BWI GmbH, is also based in this district. The fact that Meckenheim has served and continues to serve as a dormitory town for Bonn has also meant that many high-ranking civil servants and soldiers (the official first headquarters of the Federal Ministry of Defence is still in Bonn and the command centres of the armed forces branches [German: Führungsstäbe] were stationed here until 2012) have taken up residence in the surrounding area and thus also in Meckenheim.

Meckenheim is also known for its agricultural products, including fruit cultivation (Apple cultivation is also the origin of the town's self-designation as an apple town) and turnip cabbage from the Grafschafter Krautfabrik, which is located in Alt-Meckenheim. Other companies have settled in the industrial park between Merl and Lüftelberg.

== Notable people ==
- Hartmut Bagger (1938–2024), General and Chief of Staff of the German armed forces from 1996 to 1999
- Horst Köhler (born 1943), President of Germany from 2004 to 2010, lived in Meckenheim from 1977–1981 as well as 1983–1998
- Tim Lobinger (1972–2023), pole vaulter
- Egon Ramms (born 1948), General and Commander of NATO's Joint Force Command in Brunssum
- Wolfgang E. Nolting (born 1948), Vice admiral
- Jürgen Stark (born 1948), German economist, member of the Executive Board of the European Central Bank from 2006–2011
- Norbert Röttgen (born 1965), politician (CDU)
