= Swisttal =

- Municipality
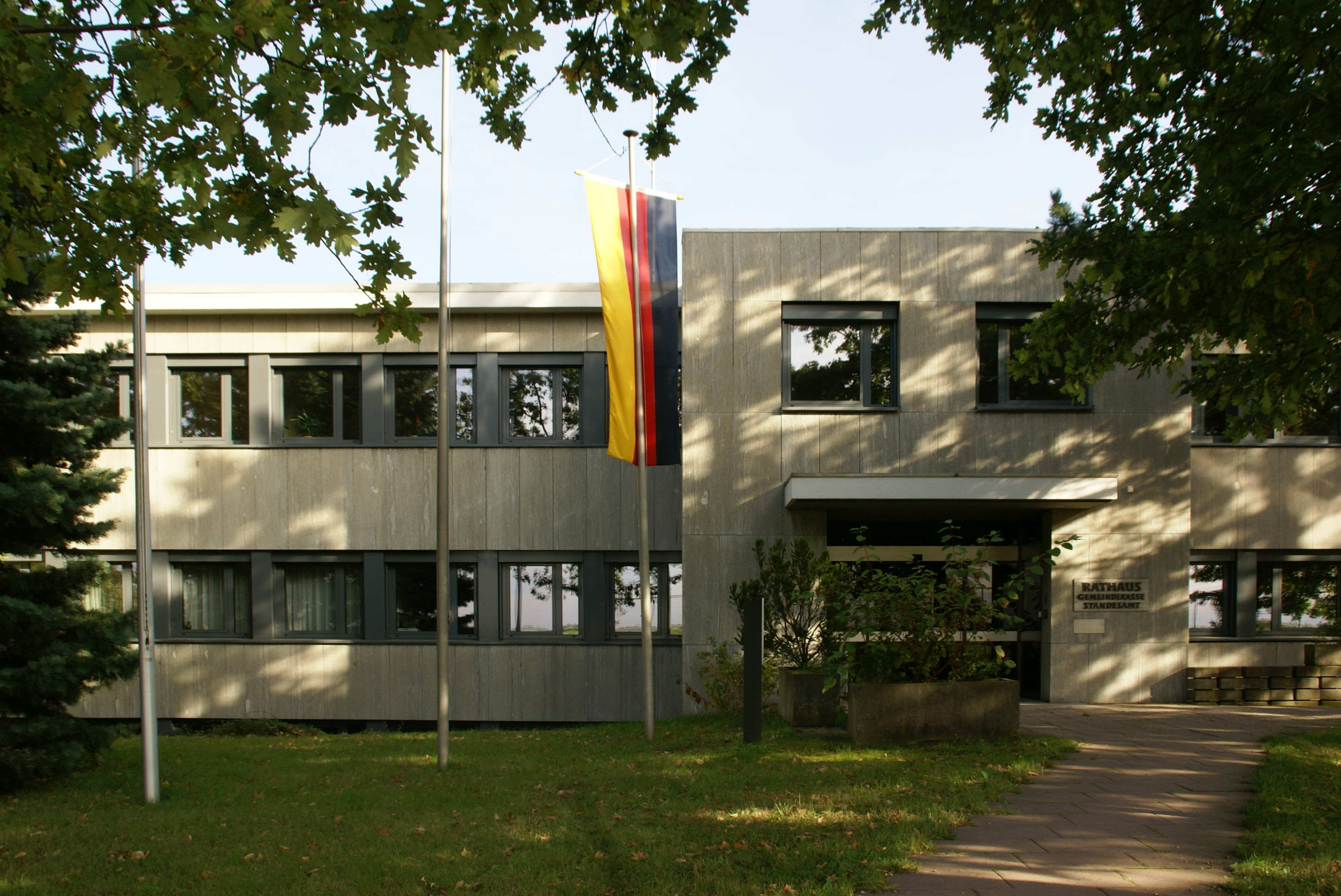
- Town hall

- Coat of arms

- Location of Swisttal within Rhein-Sieg-Kreis district
- Interactive map of Swisttal
- Location within Germany Location within North Rhine-Westphalia
- Coordinates: 50°43′04″N 06°55′13″E
- Country: Germany
- State: North Rhine-Westphalia
- Admin. region: Köln
- District: Rhein-Sieg-Kreis
- Subdivisions: 10

Government
  - Mayor (2020–25): Petra Kalkbrenner (CDU)

Area
  - Total: 62.22 km^{2} (24.02 sq mi)
- Elevation: 133–177 m (436–581 ft)

Population (2025-12-31)
  - Total: 18,662
  - Density: 299.9/km^{2} (776.8/sq mi)
- Time zone: UTC+01:00 (CET)
  - Summer (DST): UTC+02:00 (CEST)
- Postal codes: 53913
- Dialling codes: 02254, 02226, 02255, 02251
- Vehicle registration: SU
- Website: www.swisttal.de

Swisttal (German pronunciation: [ˈsvɪstˌtaːl], lit. 'Swist Valley') is a municipality in the Rhein-Sieg district, in North Rhine-Westphalia, Germany. Swisttal received its names from a brook named Swist, which flows in the middle of the municipality.

== Geography ==
Swisttal is situated approximately 15 km west of Bonn. It covers an area of approx. 65 km² (of which 10 km² is forest, part of the Kottenforst, and 49 km² is used for agriculture).

=== Subdivisions ===
The municipality consists of the following parishes:

- Heimerzheim
- Buschhoven
- Dünstekoven
- Essig
- Ludendorf
- Miel (Swisttal)
- Ollheim
- Odendorf
- Morenhoven
- Straßfeld

as well as the hamlets of Hohn, Vershoven, Moemerzheim and Muettinghoven. The local administration is situated between the villages Ludendorf and Essig.

== Population ==
Historical population

Year	Pop.	±% p.a.
1965	8,170	—
1970	9,524	+3.11%
1975	12,600	+5.76%
1980	15,683	+4.47%
1985	16,425	+0.93%
1990	17,170	+0.89%
1995	17,865	+0.80%

Year	Pop.	±% p.a.
2000	17,832	−0.04%
2005	18,141	+0.34%
2010	18,215	+0.08%
2015	18,204	−0.01%
2020	18,763	+0.61%
2025	18,662	−0.11%

Source: Landesdatabank Nordrhein-Westfalen

== Buildings and places ==
In the vicinity of the Buschhoven is the route of the former Eifel water pipeline (Eifel Aqueduct), a Roman aqueduct built to supply Cologne with drinking water. The water castle in Morenhoven, the castle of Heimerzheim and the reconciliation church in Buschhoven with its reconditioned romance organ, are worth mentioning.

=== Parks ===
Kottenforst-Ville Nature Park, a natural preserve.

== Notable residents ==
- Helmuth Prieß
