= Eifel Aqueduct =

Roman aqueduct in modern-day Germany

Coordinates: 50.5127°N 6.6108°E

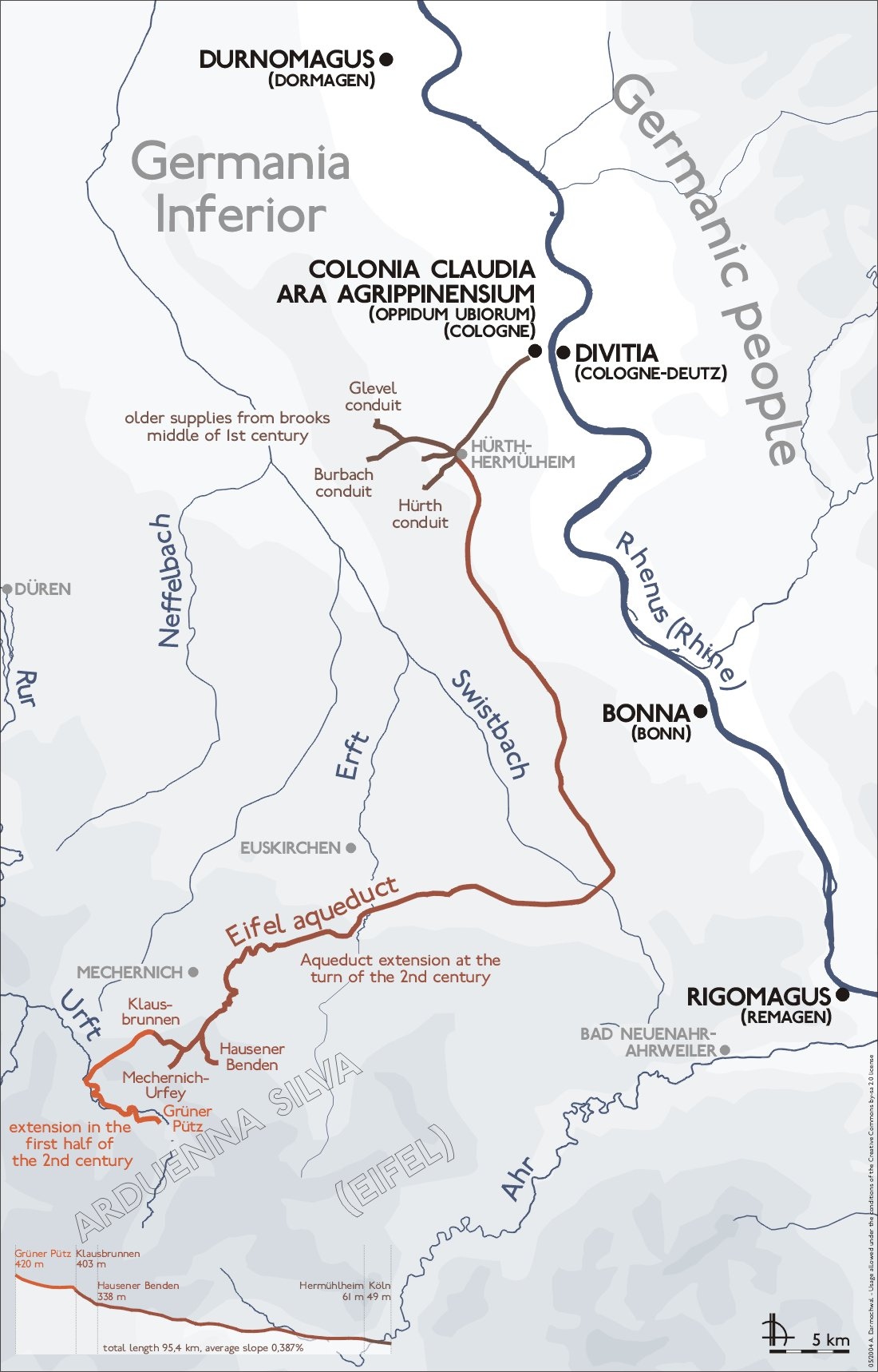
The route of the Eifel aqueduct, with its average slope.

The Eifel Aqueduct was one of the longest aqueducts of the Roman Empire.

The aqueduct, constructed in AD 80, carried water some 95 kilometres (59 mi) from the hilly Eifel region of what is now Germany to the ancient city of Colonia Claudia Ara Agrippinensium (present-day Cologne). If the auxiliary spurs to additional springs are included, the length was 130 kilometres (81 mi). The construction was almost entirely below ground, and the flow of the water was produced entirely by gravity. A few bridges, including one up to 1,400 metres (0.87 mi) in length, were needed to pass over valleys. Unlike some of the other famous Roman aqueducts, the Eifel aqueduct was specifically designed to minimize the above-ground portion to protect it from damage and freezing.

== History ==
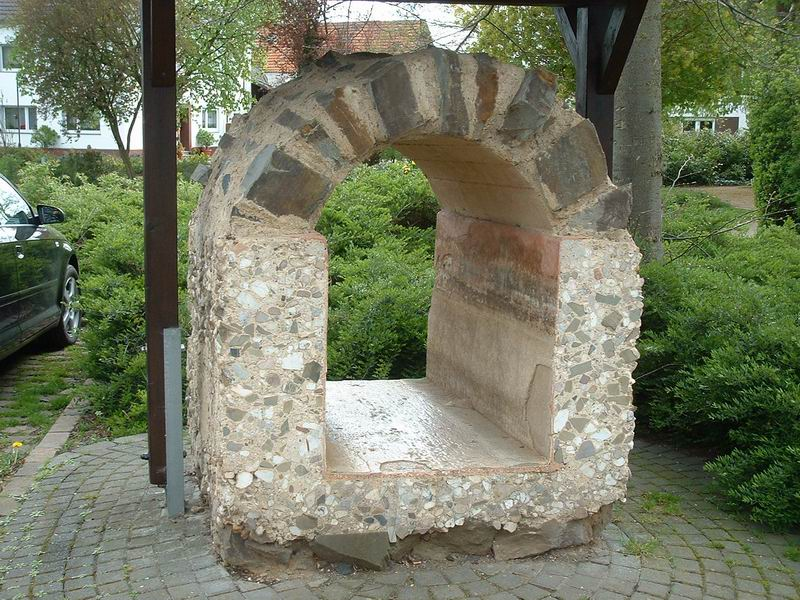
In Buschhoven, near Bonn, a small section of the aqueduct is preserved.

Before the building of the Eifel Aqueduct, Cologne got its water from the Vorgebirge aqueduct, which had its source in the springs and streams from the Ville region to the west of the city. As the city grew, this aqueduct was no longer able to provide enough water of sufficient quality: the springs contained a small amount of silt in the summer, and sometimes even ran dry. A new aqueduct was built to bring water from the springs of the Eifel into the city.

The Eifel aqueduct was built in the northern part of the region. The construction is of concrete with stones forming an arched covering. It had a maximum capacity of approximately 20,000 cubic metres (4,400,000 imp gal) of drinking water daily. The aqueduct provided water for the fountains, baths and private homes of Colonia Claudia Ara Agrippinensium. The aqueduct remained in use until about 260, when the city was first plundered by the German tribes. After this date, it was never brought back into operation, and the city obtained its water from the old Vorgebirge Aqueduct.

== Course ==
The aqueduct began at a spring in the area of Nettersheim in the Urft river valley. It then travelled along the valley to Kall, where it had to overcome the divide between the Maas and the Rhine. The Roman engineers chose this spot because they were able to overcome the divide without resorting to a tunnel or a pump. The aqueduct then ran parallel to the northern Eifel Mountains, crossing the Erft near Kreuzweingarten (in the Euskirchen district) and the Swistbach with an arched bridge. In Kottenforst, northwest of Bonn, it passed through the Vorgebirge highlands. Finally, it ran through Brühl and Hürth before arriving in Cologne. Other springs in the region that met Roman quality and quantity guidelines were also equipped with aqueducts to feed the main line.

== Architectural aspects ==
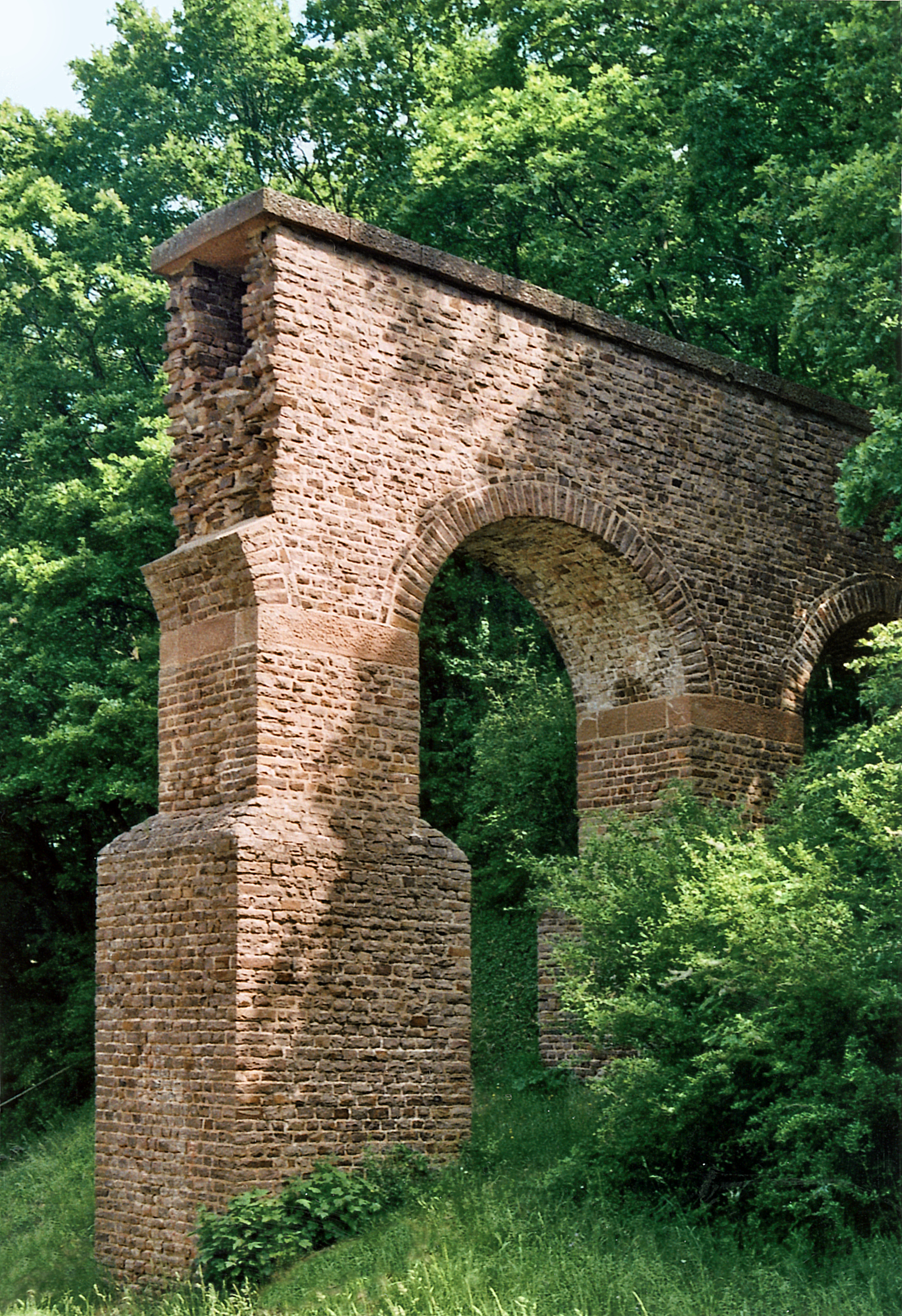
1961 reconstructed aqueduct near Mechernich-Vussem

To protect against frost, most of the aqueduct ran about 1 m (3 ft) below the Earth's surface. Archaeological excavations show that, at the lowest level, the Roman engineers had placed a loose layer of stones. On this base, they set a concrete or stone U-shaped groove for the water and, over this, cut stones and mortar were used to build a protective arch.

For the concrete work and the arch, the engineers used boards to build the form. Impressions of the wood grain remain in the concrete 2,000 years later. The aqueduct had an inner width of 70 centimetres (28 in) and a height of 1 metre (3.3 ft), so a worker could enter the tube when necessary. The outside of the aqueduct was plastered to keep dirty water out. At several locations, a drainage system was set up alongside the aqueduct to keep ground water away. Smaller streams crossed the aqueduct through culverts: one, very near the source, is still well-preserved.

The inside of the aqueduct was also plastered with a reddish mixture called opus signinum. This mixture contained lime as well as crushed bricks. This material hardened under water and prevented leakages to the outside. Small cracks were sealed with wood ash, which was strewn over them the first time the aqueduct was set in operation.

== Roman spring constructions ==
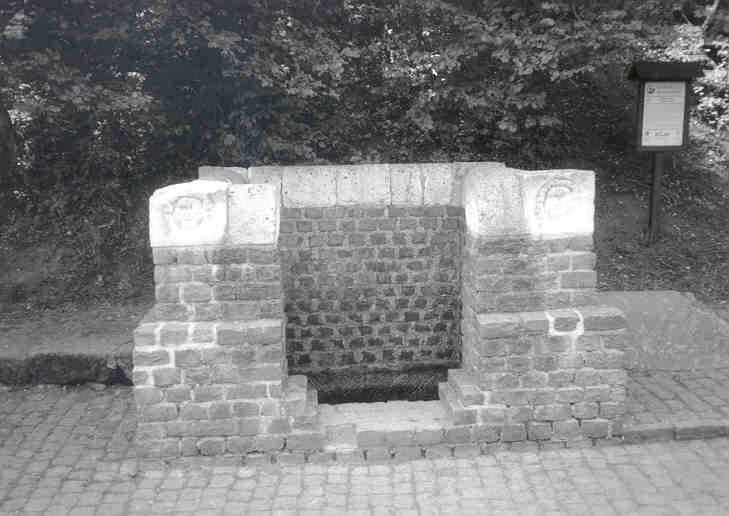
The spring at Grüner Pütz is marked by a Roman pool.

Several springs in the area were fitted with constructions to aid their direction into the aqueduct. The first is at the source, Grüner Pütz near Nettersheim. The most studied is the "Klaus fountain" at Mechernich. This site has been archaeologically reconstructed and preserved. The constructions at the various springs were designed to fit in with the characteristics of the area and would meet today's technical requirements.

There were four major areas of springs:

- Grüner Pütz (Green well) near Nettersheim
- Klausbrunnen (Klaus spring) near Mechernich
- An area of springs in Mechernich-Urfey
- The Hausener Benden in Mechernich-Eiserfey

The spring area Hausener Benden, also near Mechernich, is interesting because it was discovered rather late and was put back into use. In 1938, while searching for a drinking water source for Mechernich, the workers encountered the feed line for the aqueduct from this area. The water from the feed was simply connected into the modern water network. So as not to damage the spring, they carried out no archaeological search for the construction around the spring.

== Roman demands for water quality ==
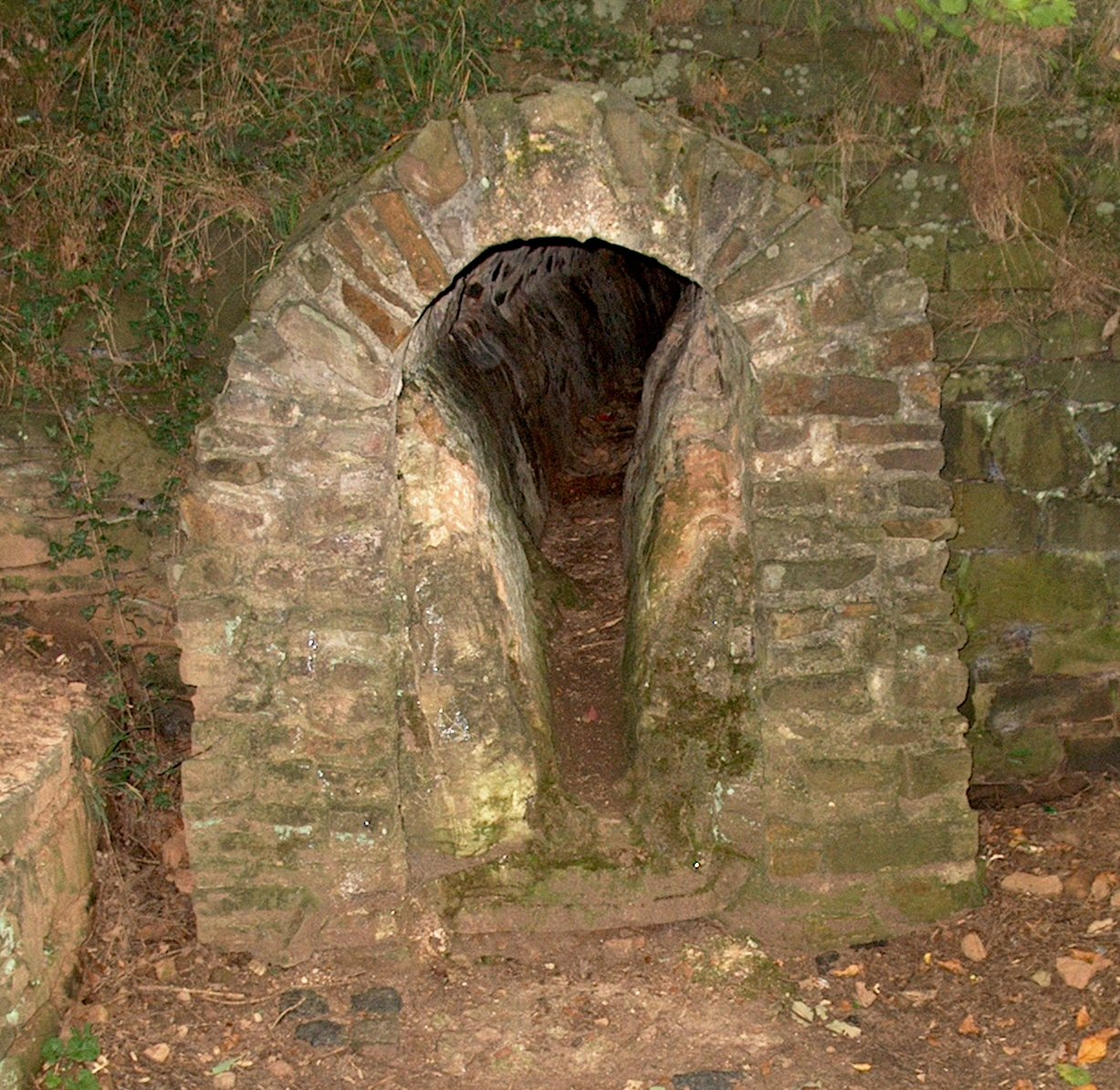
This portion of the aqueduct at Euskirchen Kreuzweingarten shows the calcium carbonate accretion on the sides of the channel.

Romans preferred drinking water with a high mineral content, preferring its taste to that of soft water. Roman architect Vitruvius described the process for testing a source of drinking water:

Springs should be tested and proved in advance in the following ways. If they run free and open, inspect and observe the physique of the people who dwell in the vicinity before beginning to conduct the water, and if their frames are strong, their complexions fresh, legs sound, and eyes clear, the springs deserve complete approval. If it is a spring just dug out, its water is excellent if it can be sprinkled into a Corinthian vase or into any other sort made of good bronze without leaving a spot on it. Again, if such water is boiled in a bronze cauldron, afterwards left for a time, and then poured off without sand or mud being found at the bottom of the cauldron, that water also will have proved its excellence.

Vitruvius insisted, "Consequently we must take great care and pains in searching for springs and selecting them, keeping in view the health of mankind." The water from the Eifel aqueduct was considered to be some of the very best water in the empire.

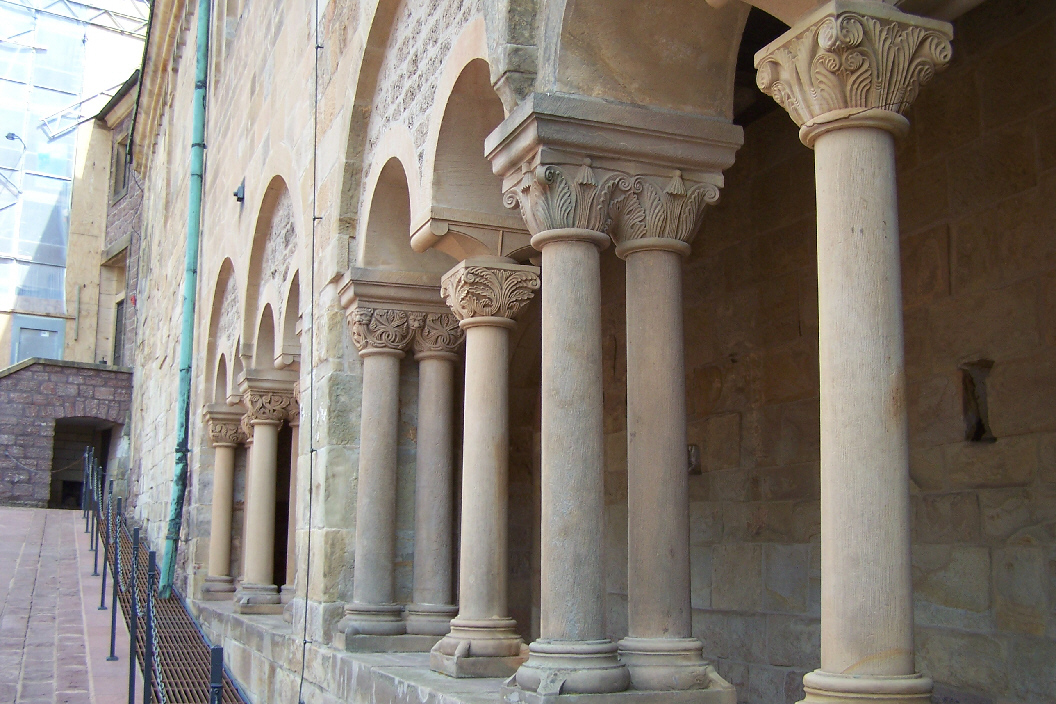
Colonnades in the Palas of Wartburg were made from the Eifel Marmor

Unfortunately, hard water tends to produce calcium carbonate deposits, and all areas of the aqueduct today have a thick layer of limestone-like deposits up to 20 centimetres (8 in) thick. Despite the reduction in the cross-sectional area of the aqueduct caused by these deposits, the aqueduct was still able to provide the necessary quantity of water for Cologne. In the Middle Ages, the layer of "Eifel marble" from the aqueduct was widely reused as building material.

== Above-ground sections ==
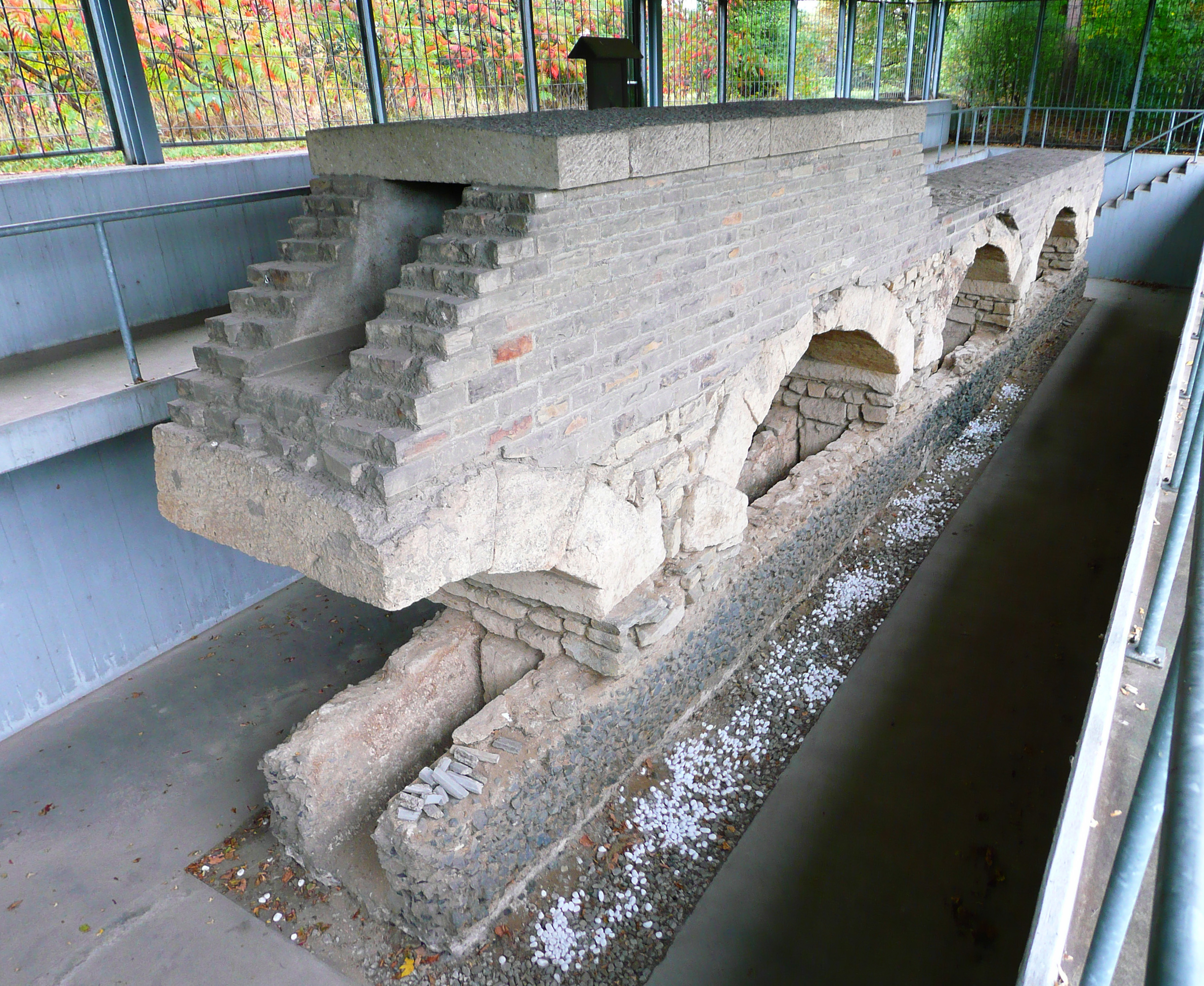
Above-ground section at Hürth near Cologne

For various reasons, the Eifel aqueduct has very few above-ground sections, unlike other Roman aqueducts, such as the Pont du Gard in southern France:

- The course of the aqueduct was chosen so as to avoid the need for such constructions.
- By construction underground, the aqueduct was protected from freezing.
- The water arriving in Cologne had a pleasant temperature due to the insulating properties of the ground.
- In case of war, the aqueduct would be less easily damaged.

Nonetheless, there are a few places where bridges or other constructions were necessary. The most notable was an arched bridge over the Swistbach near Rheinbach that was 1,400 metres (0.87 mi) long and up to 10 metres (33 ft) high. Archaeologists calculate that the original bridge had 295 arches, each 3.56 metres (11.7 ft) wide, but the bridge has been reduced to rubble with the passage of the years.

A smaller arched bridge crossed a valley near Mechernich. This was some 10 metres (33 ft) tall and 70 metres (230 ft) long. The archaeological remains were in good enough condition here that a partial reconstruction was built to show how the original must have looked.

== Roman aqueduct construction ==
Construction of the aqueduct placed great demands on the capacities and knowledge of the Roman engineers. The Romans occasionally suffered problems of low-quality work on large projects, as witnessed by Sextus Julius Frontinus.

=== Cost of building ===
Considering the amount of surveying, underground building, and bricklaying involved, a construction of this size could not be built all at once. Instead, the engineers divided the entire construction site into individual building areas. Through archaeological research, the boundaries of these building areas have been determined. For the Eifel aqueduct, they were each 15,000 Roman feet long (4,400 m or 2.7 miles in modern units). It has further been demonstrated that the surveying took place separately from the building, as is in fact the rule today in large construction projects.

For each metre (3.3 ft) of aqueduct, approximately 3–4 m³ (100–140 ft³) of earth had to be dug up, followed by 1.5 m³ (50 feet³) of concrete and bricklaying, along with 2.2 m² (24 feet²) of plaster sealant. The complete labour expense is estimated at 475,000 man-days: with about 180 possible construction days in the year due to weather conditions, 2,500 workers would have worked 16 months to complete the project. The actual construction time appears to have been even longer, since this estimate leaves out the question of surveying and production of the building materials.

After construction, the building trenches were filled in, the surface flattened, and a maintenance path built. The maintenance path also served to delimit areas where farming was not permissible. Other Roman aqueducts show similar facilities. One of the aqueducts to Lyon (France), the Aqueduct of the Gier, was marked with the following inscription:

By the authority of Emperor Trajanus Hadrianus Augustus, no one has the right to plough, sow, or plant within the area which has been reserved for the protection of the aqueduct.

=== Roman surveying ===
After a good location for the aqueduct was selected, it was necessary to guarantee a constant slope downwards in its course. Using devices similar to modern levels, the Roman engineers were capable of maintaining a slope as small as 0.1 percent—one metre of fall for every kilometre of aqueduct. In addition to the slope, it was necessary for the various building sections to be able to join up, while still maintaining a constant downward slope.

The Roman constructors of the Eifel aqueduct carefully made use of the natural fall of the land. If the work from one segment arrived too high for the next segment, they built a small pool into the course to calm the falling water.

=== Roman concrete ===
The concrete used for the Eifel aqueduct was a combination of lime, sand, stones, and water. Boards were used to make a form into which the concrete was packed. Modern tests of the quality of the concrete show that it would pass current standards. This particular concrete is called opus caementicium in Latin.

== Operation of the aqueduct ==
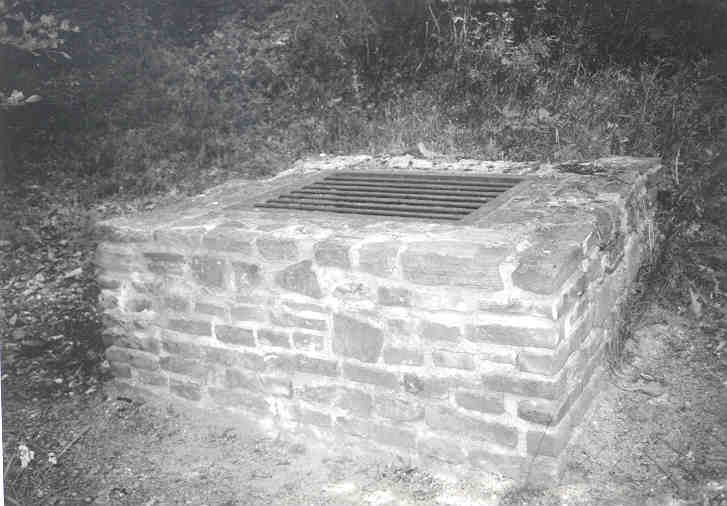
Maintenance personnel could enter into the channel of the aqueduct through shafts like this one.

For the 180 years of the aqueduct's use, from AD 80 to 260, the aqueduct required constant maintenance, improvement, cleaning, and freeing from limestone accretions. Maintenance was facilitated by regular maintenance shafts, through which a worker could descend into the aqueduct. Additional maintenance shafts were built at the sites of repairs and at the boundaries between building segments. There were also open pools at points where various springs ran together so that maintenance personnel could keep an eye on problem areas.

== Distribution of water in ancient Cologne ==
For the last few kilometres before the ancient city, the aqueduct left the ground and was supported by an aqueduct bridge approximately 10 m (33 ft) high. This additional construction enabled water to be delivered to the higher-lying areas of the city through pressurised pipes. The pipes at the time were made of lead plates bent into a ring, either soldered together or with flanges to bind the individual pipe sections together. The Romans used bronze fixtures as taps.

Incoming water arrived first at the various public fountains of the city, which were always in operation. The fountain network was so dense that no resident had to travel more than 50 m (164 ft) to get water. In addition, various public baths and private homes, as well as public toilets were provided with water. Waste water was collected in a network of canals under the city and led out into the Rhine. One section of the Roman sewer system is open for tourists under Budengasse Street in Cologne.

== The aqueduct as a stone quarry ==
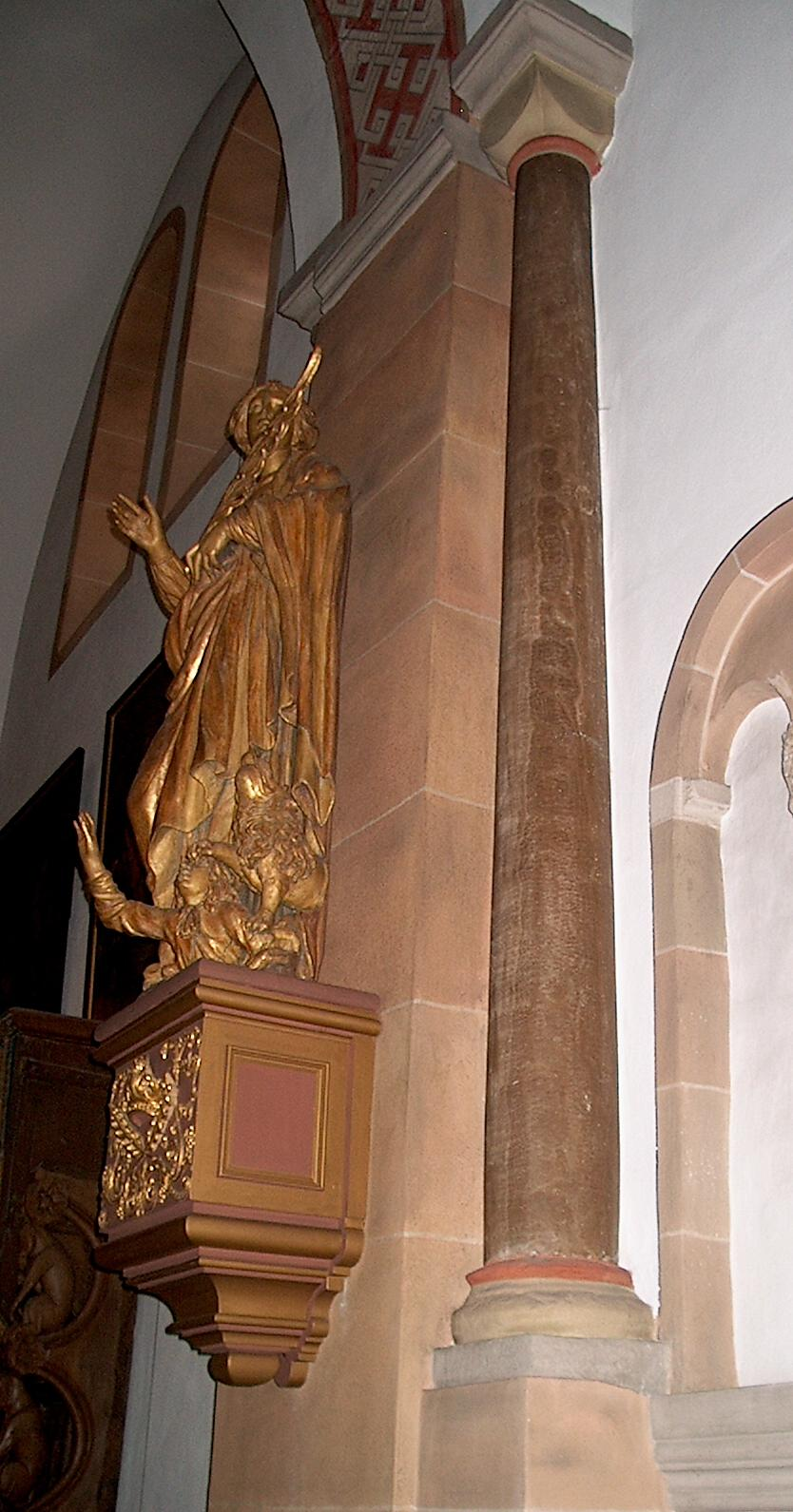
This column in the Bad Münstereifel church of SS. Chrysanthus and Daria was made out of the calcium carbonate deposits in the aqueduct

The Eifel aqueduct was destroyed by Germanic tribes in 260 during an attack on Cologne, and was never brought back into operation, even though the city continued to exist. In the course of the migration of the various tribes through the region, aqueduct technology fell out of use and knowledge. The entire aqueduct remained buried in the earth some 500 years, until the Carolingians began new construction in the Rhine valley. As this area has relatively little naturally occurring stone, the aqueduct became a favoured place for obtaining building materials. Transportable sections of the aqueduct were used to build the city wall around Rheinbach, for instance. Some of these sections still have the sealing plaster from the aqueduct intact. Thus all of the above-ground sections, and a good part of the underground construction as well, were dismantled and reused in medieval construction.

Particularly desirable as a building material were the limestone-like limescale accretions from the inside of the aqueduct. In the course of operation of the aqueduct, many sections had a layer as thick as 20 centimetres (7.9 in). The material had a consistency similar to brown marble and was easily removable from the aqueduct. Upon polishing, it showed veins, and it could also be used like a stone board when cut flat. This artificial stone found use throughout the Rhineland and was very popular for columns, window frames, and even altars. Use of "Eifel marble" can be seen as far east as Paderborn and Hildesheim, where it was used in the cathedrals. Roskilde Cathedral in Denmark is the northernmost location of its use, where several gravestones are made of it.

Medieval legend held that the aqueduct was an underground passage from Trier to Cologne. According to the legend, the Devil had bet the architect of the Cologne Cathedral that he could build this tunnel faster than the cathedral could be erected. The architect took the bet and drove the men to work with great haste. One day, the construction workers broke into the aqueduct, where flowing water could be seen. The Devil's giggling is said to have driven the architect to suicide by jumping from the half-finished cathedral tower. Supposedly, the architect's death (and not the lack of funds) was the cause of the centuries-long delay in the completion of the construction.

A few medieval writings on the aqueduct lost sight completely of the original purpose of the construction. Some say that it carried not water, but wine to the city, for example, the Gesta Treverorum written from the 12th century, and the Hymn to Saint Anno of the 11th century.

== Tourism ==
The hiking trail along the Eifel aqueduct is marked with a distinctive logo.

The Römerkanal-Wanderweg ("Roman canal hiking trail") runs for approximately 100 kilometres (62 mi) along the aqueduct's path from Nettersheim all the way to Cologne. Public transport links are good, allowing the trail to be walked in various stages. It may also be used as a bike trail. There are approximately 75 information stations along the way, providing an excellent view of the aqueduct.

== Legacy ==
Archaeological research on the Eifel aqueduct started in the 19th century. C.A. Eick was the discoverer of the farthest source from Cologne at Grüner Pütz near Nettersheim (in 1867). Systematic study of the aqueduct was carried out from 1940 to 1970 by Waldemar Haberey (de). His 1971 book is still a suitable guide along the course of the construction. In 1980, archaeologist Klaus Grewe (de) completely mapped out the location line and added it to the official German topographic map. His Atlas der römischen Wasserleitungen nach Köln (Atlas of Roman Aqueducts to Cologne, 1986) is a standard work for researchers in Roman architecture.

The Eifel aqueduct is an archaeological site suited for the study of Roman surveying, organizational ability, and engineering know-how. It is also a symbol for the loss of technical knowledge during the decline of civilisations that between the Middle Ages and more recent times, no better use was found for the aqueduct than as a stone quarry. The Roman level of technology in this area was not equalled until the 19th and 20th centuries.

== Sources ==
- Grewe, Klaus. Der Römerkanalwanderweg. Eifelverein Düren. ISBN 3-921805-16-3.
- Grewe, Klaus. Atlas der römischen Wasserleitungen nach Köln. Rheinland-Verlag. ISBN 3-7927-0868-X.
- Haberey, Waldemar. Die römischen Wasserleitungen nach Köln. Rheinland-Verlag, 1971. ISBN 3-7927-0146-4.
- Hodge, Trevor. Roman Aqueducts and Water Supply. London: Duckworth, 2002. ISBN 0-7156-3171-3.
- Jeep, John M. Medieval Germany: An Encyclopedia. Routledge, 2001. ISBN 0-8240-7644-3.
- Lewis, M.J.T. Surveying Instruments of Greece and Rome. Cambridge University, 2001. ISBN 0-521-79297-5.
- Pörtner, Rudolf. Mit dem Fahrstuhl in die Römerzeit. Moewig, Rastatt 2000. ISBN 3-8118-3102-X.
- Tegethoff, F. Wolfgang; Rohleder, Johannes; Kroker, Evelyn. Calcium Carbonate: From the Cretaceous Period Into the 21st Century. Birkhäuser, 2001. ISBN 3-7643-6425-4.
- Bedoyere, Guy de la. English Heritage Book of Roman Towns in Britain. Rowman & Littlefield, 1992. ISBN 0-7134-6893-9.

== See also ==
- Roman engineering
- Roman technology
