= Rhein-Sieg-Kreis =

Coordinates: 50°45′N 7°15′E

- District
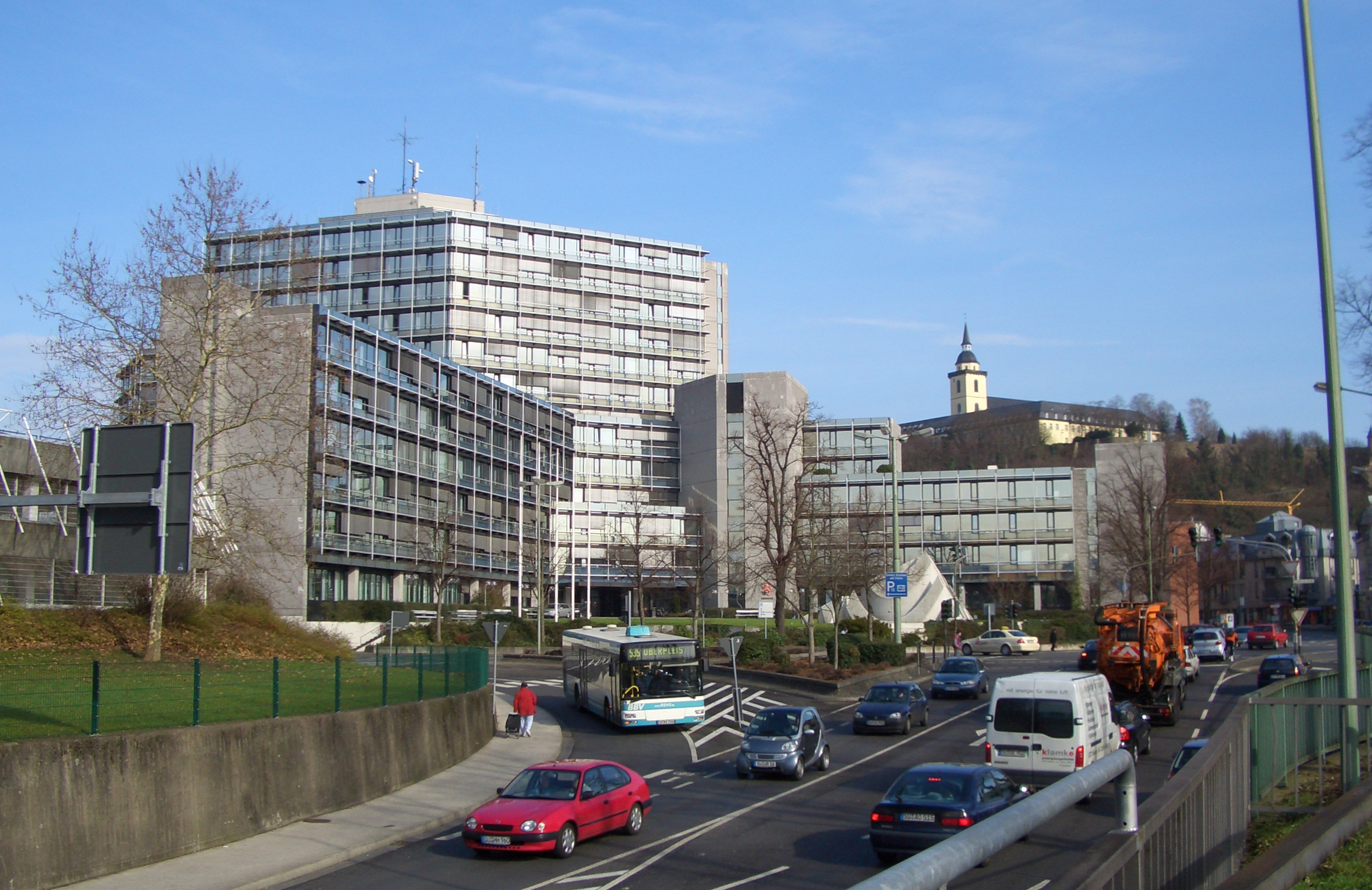
- Kreishaus Siegburg

- Flag Coat of arms
- Country: Germany
- State: North Rhine-Westphalia
- Adm. region: Cologne
- Capital: Siegburg

Government
  - District admin.: Sebastian Schuster (CDU)

Area
  - Total: 1,153.51 km^{2} (445.37 sq mi)

Population (31 December 2025)
  - Total: 603,456
  - Density: 523.148/km^{2} (1,354.95/sq mi)
- Time zone: UTC+01:00 (CET)
  - Summer (DST): UTC+02:00 (CEST)
- Vehicle registration: SU
- Website: https://www.rhein-sieg-kreis.de

The Rhein-Sieg-Kreis (Kölsch: Rhein-Siech-Kreis) is a Kreis (district) in the south of North Rhine-Westphalia, Germany. Neighboring districts are Rheinisch-Bergischer Kreis, Oberbergischer Kreis, Altenkirchen, Neuwied, Ahrweiler, Euskirchen, Rhein-Erft-Kreis, the urban district of Cologne. The federal city of Bonn is nearly completely surrounded by the district.

== History ==
The district as known today was created in 1969, during the reorganization of the districts in North Rhine-Westphalia, by merging Sieg District with the District of Bonn (from which Bonn itself was separated in 1887 to become an urban district). Sieg District was created in 1825.

== Geography ==
Geographically Rhein-Sieg District covers the valley of the river Sieg and also, since the merger with the District of Bonn, that of the Rhine around Bonn, as well an area in the most easterly part of the Eifel.

== Politics ==
District council as elected in 2025
Total 88 seats
- The Left (Germany): 3
- Social Democratic Party of Germany: 18
- Volt Germany: 2
- Alliance 90/The Greens: 13
- Sahra Wagenknecht Alliance: 2
- Free Democratic Party (Germany): 3
- Free Voters: 1
- Christian Democratic Union of Germany: 34
- Alternative for Germany: 12

Municipal elections are held every five years, in which the district administrator (German: Landrat) and district council (German: Kreistag) of the Rhein-Sieg-Kreis are chosen. The last election took place on 14 September 2025.

=== District council ===
The district council consists of 88 seats, half of which are chosen directly in 44 constituencies. The remaining 44 seats are distributed via party lists, resulting in a proportional representation.

On 3 November 2020, the Christian Democrats and the Greens announced their coalition agreement, renewing their 21-year governance.

=== District administrator ===
The district administrator is Sebastian Schuster. The Christian Democrat received 53.18% of the vote.

=== Coat of arms ===
The red lion is the symbol of the dukes of Berg, who owned a large part of the district. The black cross in the shield is the symbol of Cologne, because another part of the district was owned by the bishops of Cologne. The yellow sword is the symbol of Saint Michael, the patron of the mighty Michaelsberg Abbey in Siegburg.

== Demographics ==
Number of 1st and 2nd generation foreigners in Rhein-Sieg-Kreis by top 10 country of origin per 31 December 2007

Rank	Ancestry	Number
1	Turkey	13,255
2	Greece	3,982
3	Italy	3,024
4	Poland	2,825
5	Portugal	1,353
6	Netherlands	1,284
7	Morocco	1,272
8	Russia	1,244
9	Spain	1,203
10	Austria	994

== Towns and municipalities ==
Clickable map of towns and municipalities in the district

Towns
1. Bad Honnef
2. Bornheim
3. Hennef (Sieg)
4. Königswinter
5. Lohmar
6. Meckenheim
7. Niederkassel
8. Rheinbach
9. Sankt Augustin
10. Siegburg
11. Troisdorf
Municipalities
1. Alfter
2. Eitorf
3. Much
4. Neunkirchen-Seelscheid
5. Ruppichteroth
6. Swisttal
7. Wachtberg
8. Windeck
