= Euskirchen-Kreuzweingarten station =

Railway station in Germany

Euskirchen-Kreuzweingarten
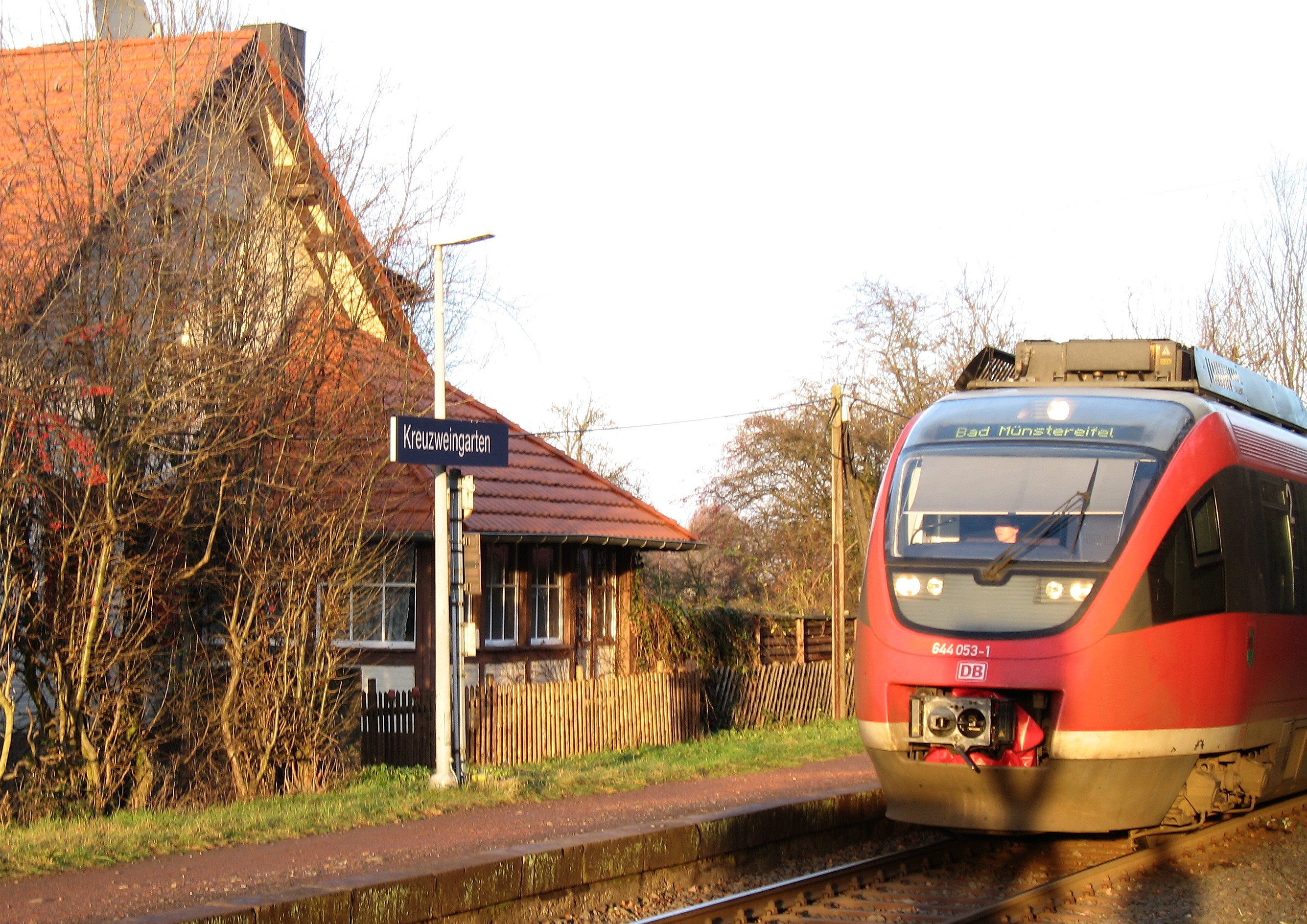

General information
- Location: Adolf-Bohnen-Weg; 53881 Euskirchen; North Rhine-Westphalia; Germany
- Coordinates: 50.6131°N 6.7961°E
- Owner: DB Netz
- Operator: DB Station&Service
- Line: Erft Valley Railway
- Platforms: 1 side platform
- Tracks: 1
- Train operators: DB Regio NRW

Other information
- Station code: 3421
- DS100 code: KKRW
- IBNR: 8003440
- Category: 7
- Fare zone: VRS: 2720
- Website: www.bahnhof.de

History
- Opened: 1 October 1890; 135 years ago

Services
Preceding station	DB Regio NRW	Following station
Bad Münstereifel-Arloff towards Bad Münstereifel	RB 23	Euskirchen-Stotzheim towards Euskirchen
Location
- Location within North Rhine-Westphalia

Euskirchen-Kreuzweingarten station is a railway station in the Kreuzweingarten district of the municipality of Euskirchen, located in the Euskirchen district in North Rhine-Westphalia, Germany.
