= Rheinbach Römerkanal station =

Railway station in Germany

Rheinbach Römerkanal

General information
- Location: Siemensstraße; 53359 Rheinbach; North Rhine-Westphalia; Germany
- Coordinates: 50.6283°N 6.9676°E
- Owner: DB Netz
- Operator: DB Station&Service
- Line: Voreifel Railway
- Platforms: 2 side platforms
- Tracks: 2
- Train operators: DB Regio NRW

Construction
- Accessible: Yes

Other information
- Station code: 8250
- DS100 code: KRBL
- IBNR: 8005057
- Category: 6
- Fare zone: VRS: 2525
- Website: www.bahnhof.de

History
- Opened: 15 December 2013; 12 years ago

Services
Preceding station	Cologne S-Bahn	Following station
Rheinbach towards Euskirchen	S23	Meckenheim towards Bonn Hbf
Location
- Location within North Rhine-Westphalia

Rheinbach Römerkanal station is a railway station in the eastern part of the municipality of Rheinbach, located in the Rhein-Sieg-Kreis district in North Rhine-Westphalia, Germany.
