= Rheinbach station =

Railway station in Germany

Rheinbach
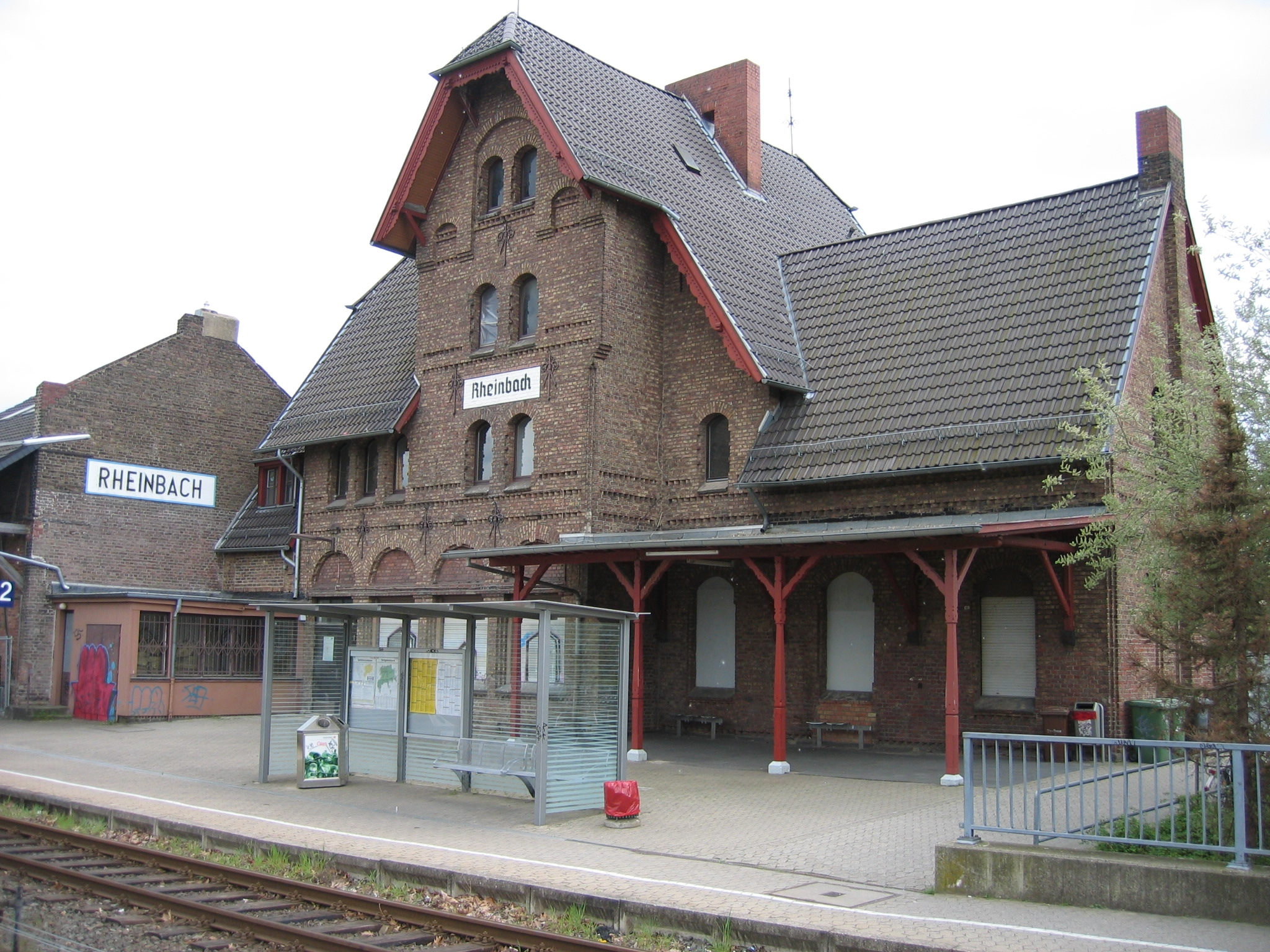

General information
- Location: Bahnhofstraße 36; 53359 Rheinbach; North Rhine-Westphalia; Germany
- Coordinates: 50.6291°N 6.9479°E
- Owner: DB Netz
- Operator: DB Station&Service
- Line: Voreifel Railway
- Platforms: 2 side platforms
- Tracks: 2
- Train operators: DB Regio NRW

Construction
- Accessible: Yes

Other information
- Station code: 5248
- DS100 code: KRBA
- IBNR: 8005058
- Category: 6
- Fare zone: VRS: 2525
- Website: www.bahnhof.de

Services
Preceding station	Cologne S-Bahn	Following station
Swisttal-Odendorf towards Euskirchen	S23	Rheinbach Römerkanal towards Bonn Hbf
Location
- Location within North Rhine-Westphalia

Rheinbach station is a railway station in the municipality of Rheinbach, located in the Rhein-Sieg-Kreis district in North Rhine-Westphalia, Germany.
