= Euskirchen-Stotzheim station =

Railway station in Germany

Euskirchen-Stotzheim
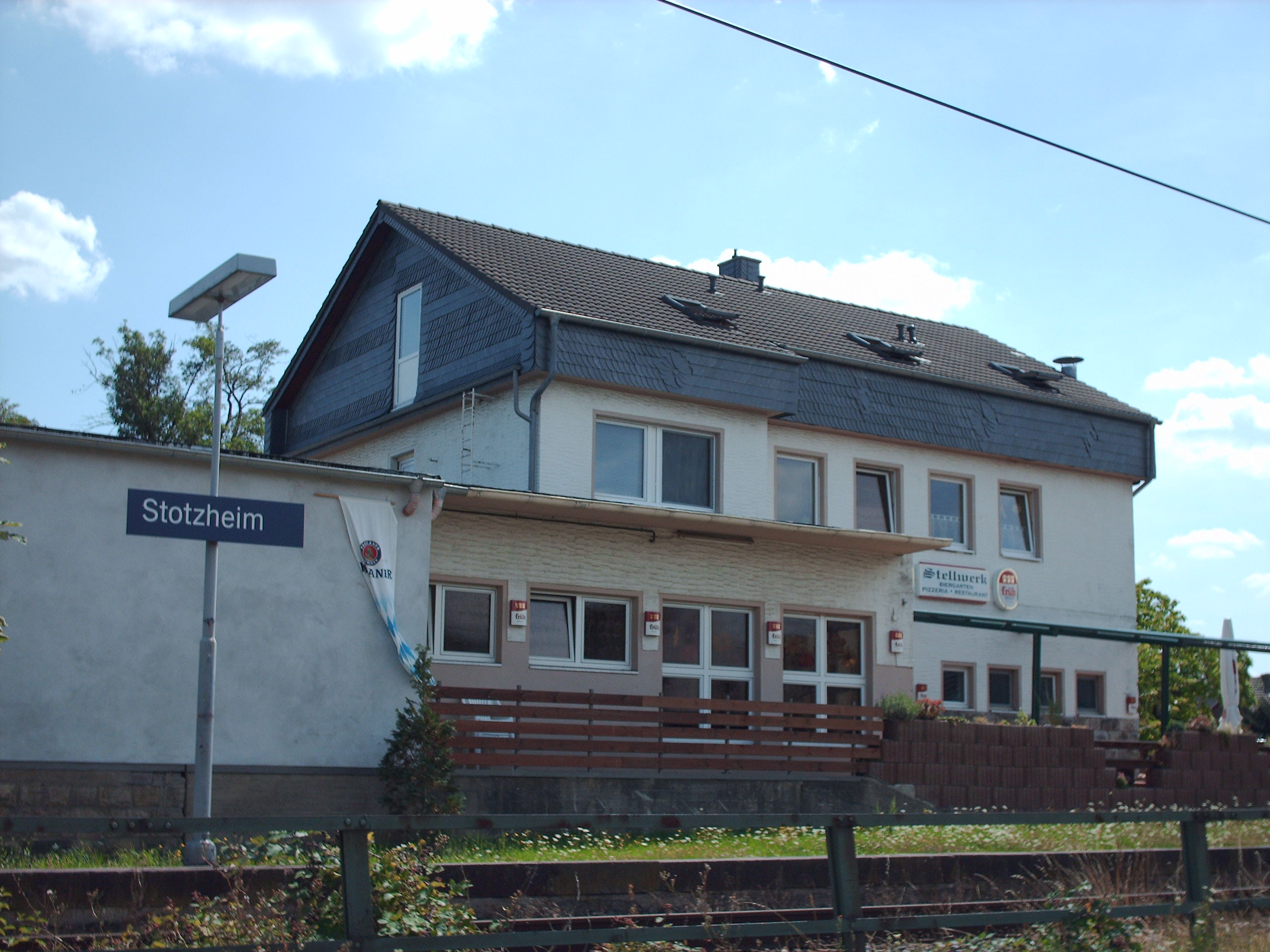

General information
- Location: Adolf-Halstrick-Straße 1; 53881 Euskirchen; North Rhine-Westphalia; Germany
- Coordinates: 50°38′02″N 6°48′39″E
- Owner: DB Netz
- Operator: DB Station&Service
- Line: Erft Valley Railway
- Platforms: 1 side platform
- Tracks: 1
- Train operators: DB Regio NRW

Other information
- Station code: 6048
- DS100 code: KSTZ
- IBNR: 8005748
- Category: 7
- Fare zone: VRS: 2720
- Website: www.bahnhof.de

History
- Opened: 1890; 136 years ago

Services
Preceding station	DB Regio NRW	Following station
Euskirchen-Kreuzweingarten towards Bad Münstereifel	RB 23	Euskirchen Zuckerfabrik towards Euskirchen
Location
- Location within North Rhine-Westphalia

Euskirchen-Stotzheim station is a railway station in the Stotzheim district of the municipality of Euskirchen, located in the Euskirchen district in North Rhine-Westphalia, Germany.
