= Bad Münstereifel-Arloff station =

Railway station in Bad Münstereifel, Germany

Bad Münstereifel-Arloff
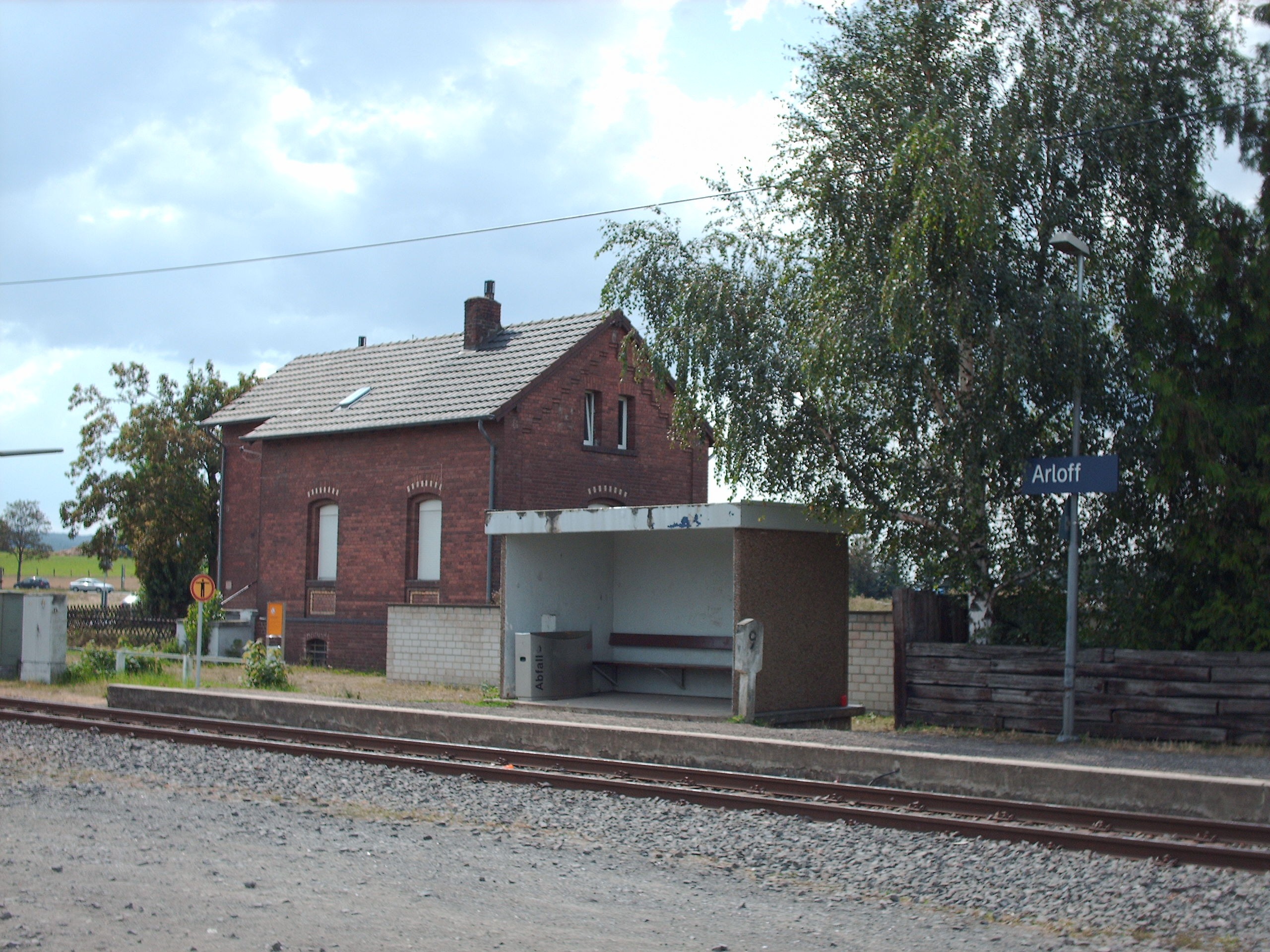

General information
- Location: Bahnhofstraße 52; 53902 Bad Münstereifel; North Rhine-Westphalia; Germany
- Coordinates: 50.5977°N 6.7868°E
- Owner: DB Netz
- Operator: DB Station&Service
- Line: Erft Valley Railway
- Platforms: 1 side platform
- Tracks: 1
- Train operators: DB Regio NRW

Other information
- Station code: 174
- DS100 code: KARL
- IBNR: 8000601
- Category: 7
- Fare zone: VRS: 2730
- Website: www.bahnhof.de

History
- Opened: 1890; 136 years ago

Services
Preceding station	DB Regio NRW	Following station
Bad Münstereifel-Iversheim towards Bad Münstereifel	RB 23	Euskirchen-Kreuzweingarten towards Euskirchen
Location
- Location within North Rhine-Westphalia

Bad Münstereifel-Arloff station is a railway station in the Arloff district of the municipality of Bad Münstereifel, located in the Euskirchen district in North Rhine-Westphalia, Germany.
