= Euskirchen Zuckerfabrik station =

Railway station in Germany

Coordinates: 50.6567°N 6.8133°E

Euskirchen Zuckerfabrik
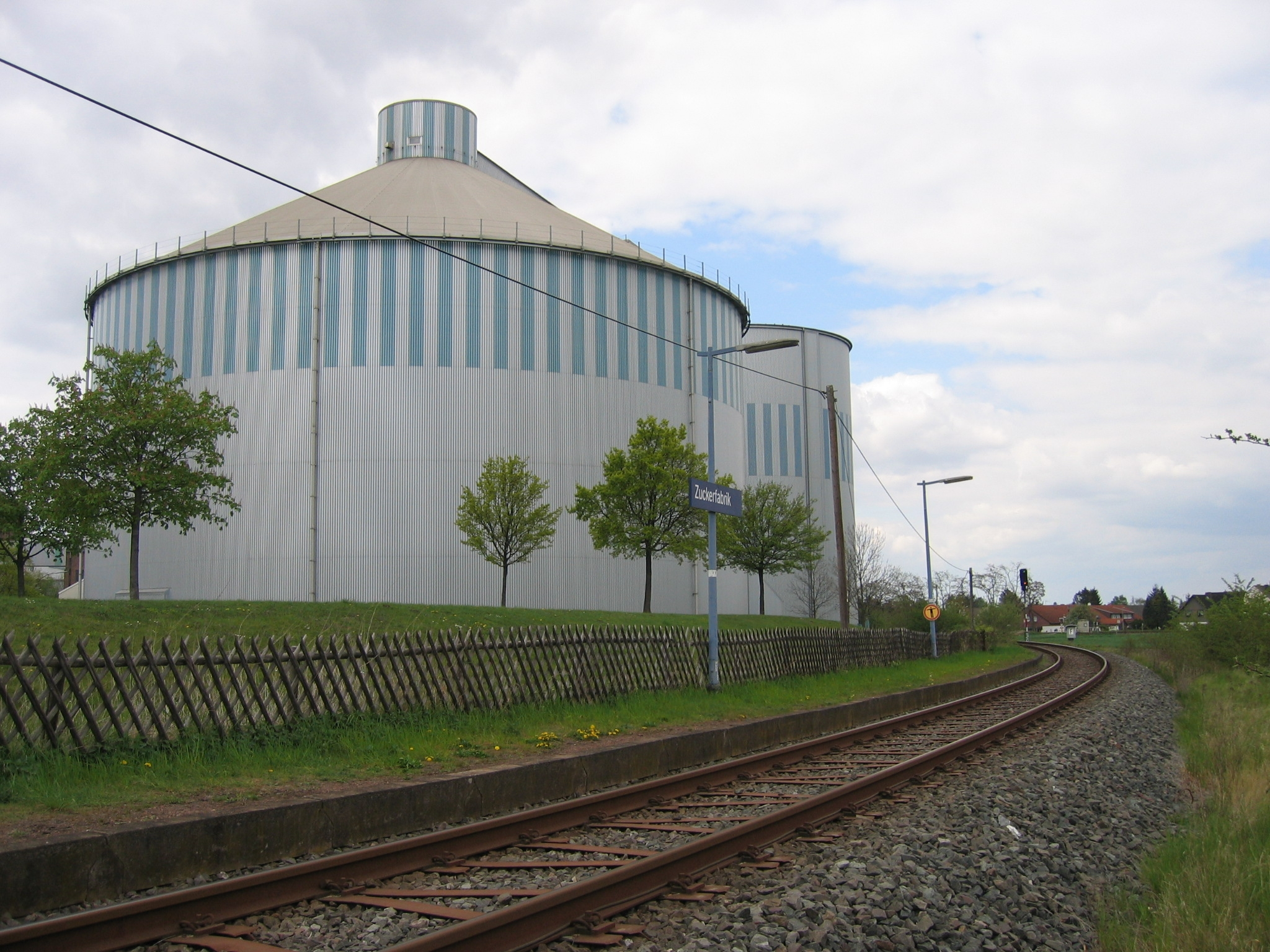

General information
- Location: Bonner Straße 10; 53879 Euskirchen; North Rhine-Westphalia; Germany
- Owner: DB Netz
- Operator: DB Station&Service
- Line: Erft Valley Railway
- Platforms: 2 side platforms
- Tracks: 1
- Train operators: DB Regio NRW

Other information
- Station code: 7058
- DS100 code: KZU
- IBNR: 8006673
- Category: 7
- Fare zone: VRS: 2720
- Website: www.bahnhof.de

History
- Opened: 21 March 1928; 98 years ago

Services
Preceding station	DB Regio NRW	Following station
Euskirchen-Stotzheim towards Bad Münstereifel	RB 23	Euskirchen Terminus
Location
- Location within North Rhine-Westphalia

Euskirchen Zuckerfabrik station was a railway station in the municipality of Euskirchen, located in the Euskirchen district in North Rhine-Westphalia, Germany.

The station became a request stop with the change of the 2002 timetable.

== Location ==
The station is located near the sugar refinery of Pfeifer & Langen.
