= Dahlemer Binz Airfield =

Dahlemer Binz Airfield Flugplatz Dahlemer Binz
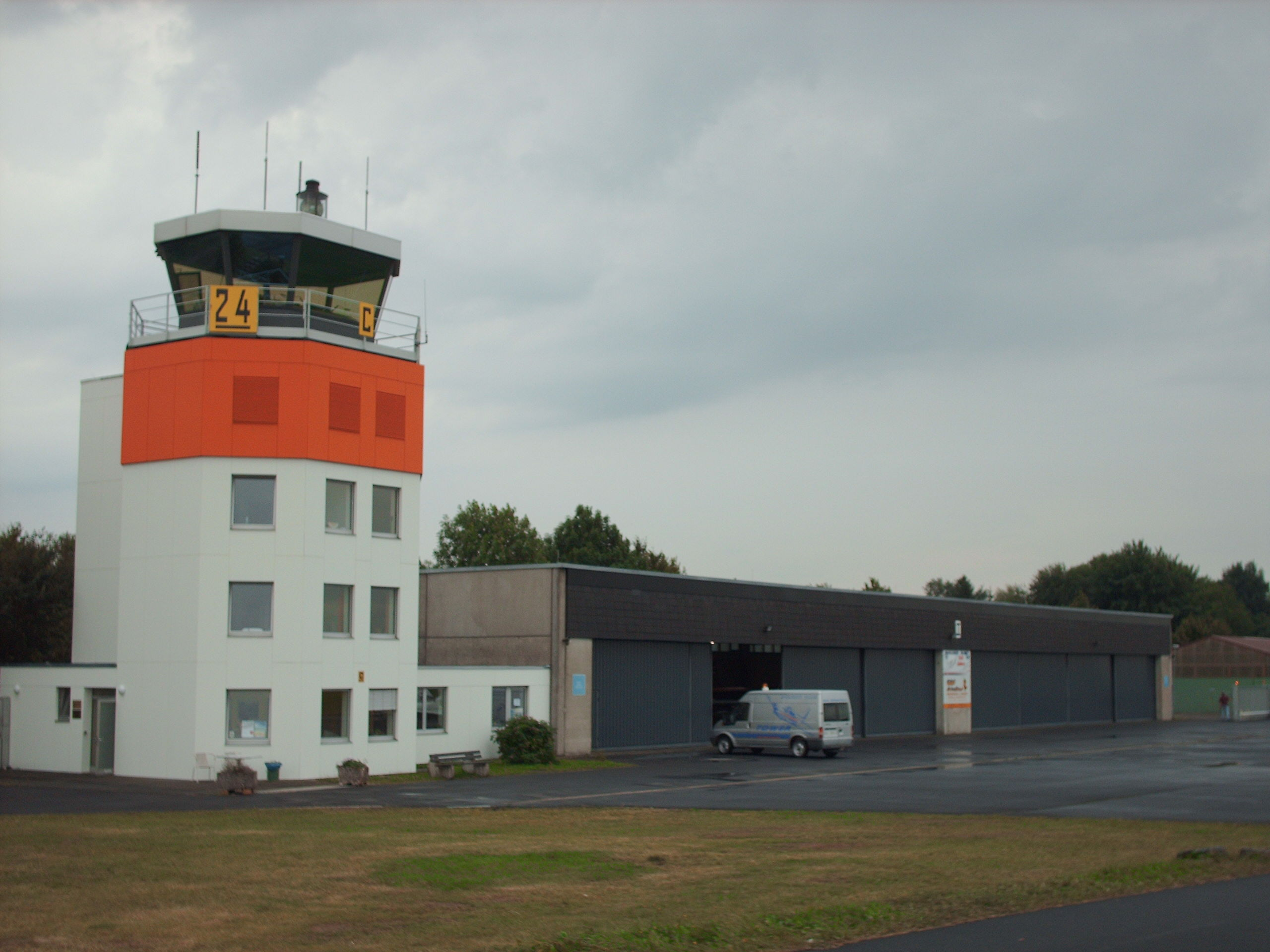
- IATA: none; ICAO: EDKV

Summary
- Airport type: Public
- Operator: Flugplatzgesellschaft Dahlemer Binz GmbH
- Location: Dahlem, North Rhine-Westphalia, Germany
- Opened: 1957
- Elevation AMSL: 578 m / 1,896 ft
- Coordinates: 50°24′20″N 006°31′44″E

Map
- Location in North Rhine-Westphalia

Runways
Direction	Length		Surface
Direction	m	ft	Surface
06/24	1,070	3,510	Asphalt

Dahlemer Binz Airfield (German: Flugplatz Dahlemer Binz) is a public general aviation airfield in the Eifel mountains of Germany. It is located in the municipality of Dahlem, about 35 kilometres southwest of Euskirchen.

The airfield is licensed for:

- Powered aircraft (incl. helicopters) up to 5,700 kg flying weight (Fluggewicht)
- Motor gliders
- Gliders, both winched and towed
- Microlights
- Hot air balloons
- Parachuting
