= KZU =

KZU or kzu may refer to:

- Kantonsschule Zürcher Unterland, a Langzeit und Kurzzeit-Mittelschule in Bülach, Switzerland
- KZU, the DS100 code for Euskirchen Zuckerfabrik station, North Rhine-Westphalia, Germany
- KZU, the Pinyin code for Kazuo railway station, Liaoning, China
- kzu, the ISO 639-3 code for Kayupulau language, Papua, Indonesia
