= Bad Münstereifel-Iversheim station =

Railway station in Bad Münstereifel, Germany

Bad Münstereifel-Iversheim
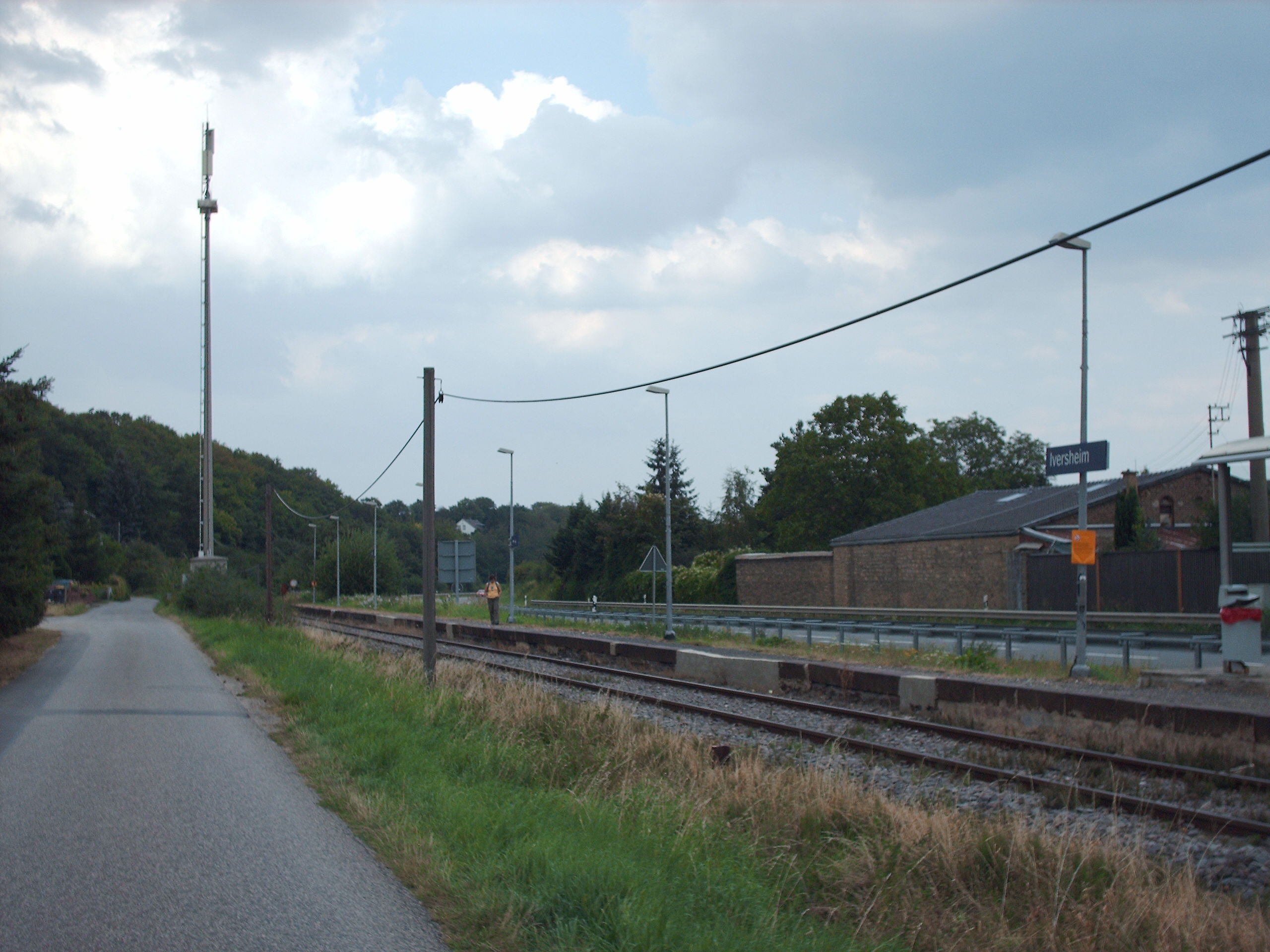

General information
- Location: Eschweiler Weg; 53902 Bad Münstereifel; North Rhine-Westphalia; Germany
- Coordinates: 50.5829°N 6.7692°E
- Owner: DB Netz
- Operator: DB Station&Service
- Line: Erft Valley Railway
- Platforms: 1 side platform
- Tracks: 1
- Train operators: DB Regio NRW

Other information
- Station code: 3018
- DS100 code: KIV
- IBNR: 8003104
- Category: 6
- Fare zone: VRS: 2730
- Website: www.bahnhof.de

Services
Preceding station	DB Regio NRW	Following station
Bad Münstereifel Terminus	RB 23	Bad Münstereifel-Arloff towards Euskirchen
Location
- Location within North Rhine-Westphalia

Bad Münstereifel-Iversheim station is a railway station in the Iversheim district of the municipality of Bad Münstereifel, located in the Euskirchen district in North Rhine-Westphalia, Germany.
