= Klaus Voussem =

German politician (born 1970)

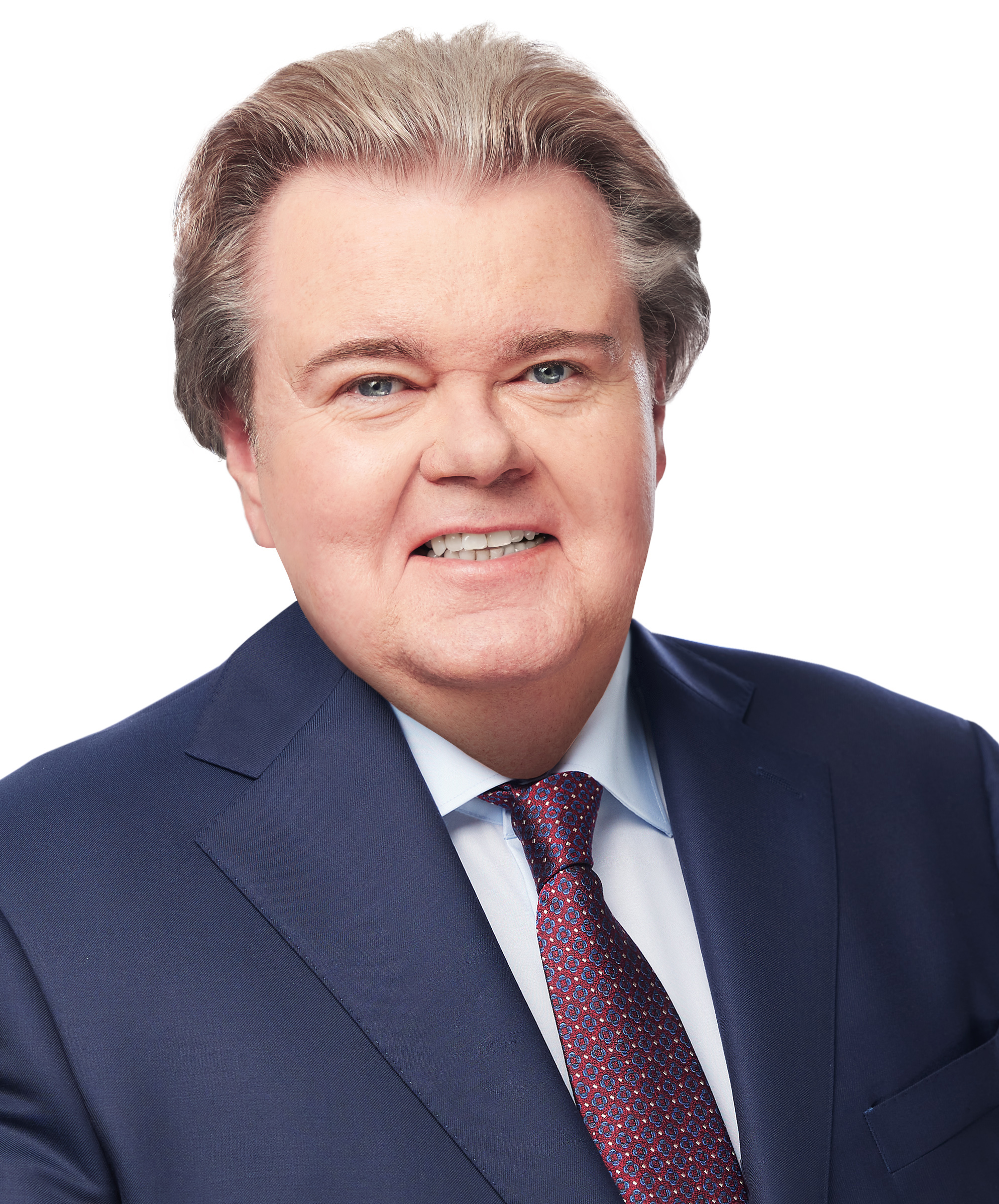
- Voussem in 2022

Member of the Landtag of North Rhine-Westphalia
- Incumbent
- Assumed office 9 June 2010
- Preceded by: Clemens Pick
- Constituency: Euskirchen I

Personal details
- Born: 27 August 1970 (age 55) Euskirchen
- Party: Christian Democratic Union (since 1987)

Klaus Martin Voussem (born 27 August 1970 in Euskirchen) is a German politician serving as a member of the Landtag of North Rhine-Westphalia since 2010. He has served as chairman of the Christian Democratic Union in Euskirchen since 2011.
