= Börde Railway =

Railway in Germany

Düren–Euskirchen railway
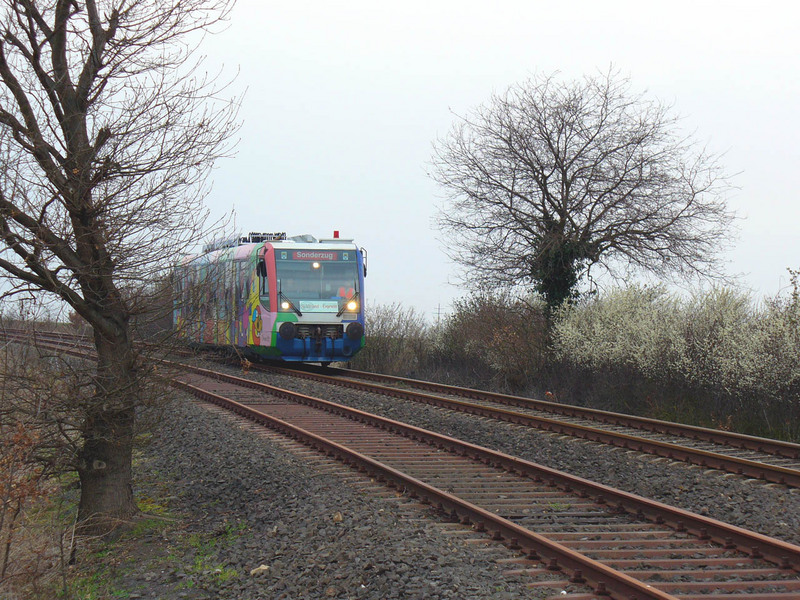
- Bördeexpress near Zülpich

Overview
- Native name: Bördebahn
- Line number: 2585
- Locale: North Rhine-Westphalia, Germany

Service
- Route number: 12474

Technical
- Line length: 30.2 km (18.8 mi)
- Track gauge: 1,435 mm (4 ft 8 1/2 in) standard gauge
- Minimum radius: 500 m (1,600 ft)
- Maximum incline: 1.25%

The Börde Railway (German: Bördebahn) is a single track (formerly double track), non-electrified branch line in the German state of North Rhine-Westphalia, running from Düren via Zülpich to Euskirchen. It is named after the Jülich-Zülpich Börde (a plain with fertile loess soil), which it runs through. Today, it is particularly important for freight transport. Every weekend, the Eifel-Bördebahn (RB 28) is operated as a volunteer-operated passenger train. The services is also scheduled to run during the week from 2018, running hourly from 2020.

== History ==
The Rhenish Railway Company (Rheinische Eisenbahn-Gesellschaft, RhE) received a concession on 5 March 1856 for the construction and operation of a railway line between Düren and Schleiden. This route was required by the iron industry in the Eifel to transport ore and coal from the Inderevier and Wurm districts. On 6 October 1864, the Börde Railway was opened between Düren and Euskirchen. The steam locomotive Roer zog hauled seven carriages from Euskirchen to Düren.

In 1871, the section of the Eifel line from Euskirchen to Kall was opened. The Eifel line was then built past its original objective at Schleiden, although a branch line from Kall to Schleiden was not opened until 1884. In 1875, the Kalscheuren–Euskirchen section was completed. In 1880 the Euskirchen–Bonn line was opened. At the same time the Rhenish Railway Company was nationalised by the Kingdom of Prussia.

The level of traffic in 1905 is reflected in the number of tickets sold:

- Bubenheim: 21 226 tickets,
- Vettweiß: 37 883 tickets,
- Zülpich: 60 532 tickets and
- Dürscheven: 22 170 tickets.

The line was duplicated in the 1920s, during the French occupation. Dismantling of the line began in 1955, when the second track was removed between Bubenheim and Dürscheven. At that time only 18 trains ran in each direction each day. In 1964, it was proposed to electrify the Düren–Euskirchen–Bonn route to create a bypass of the major node of Cologne that could be operated electrically, but this was not realised.

=== Decline ===
On 27 May 1979 the Düren–Bonn line was converted into two separate lines for operations, Düren–Euskirchen and Euskirchen–Bonn, to reduce costs. At the same time, the Düren–Euskirchen line was converted into a branch line and a simplified system of train control (Zugleitbetrieb) was introduced. Deutsche Bundesbahn discontinued scheduled passenger operations on 27 May 1983. The first train for years ran on 6 July 1997 from Düren to Euskirchen.

=== Takeover by the Dürener Kreisbahn ===
On 19 December 2002 Dürener Kreisbahn (the transport operator owned by the city of Düren) acquired about 310,000 square metres of land, which comprises the railway track from Düren to Zülpich, from Deutsche Bahn, at a price of around € 860,000.

The Rurtalbahn GmbH, a subsidiary of Dürener Kreisbahn with its headquarters in Düren, operates freight trains on the section between Düren and the industrial siding of the KAPPA Zülpich-Papier company at Zülpich station.

There are continuing efforts to re-establish regular passenger services on the line. The Zülpich–Euskirchen section has been offered for sale but it has not been sold and is still owned by DB Netze. The track is no longer connected to DB’s tracks at Euskirchen station.
