= Michael Preisinger =

German consultant, journalist, author and TV host

Michael Mig Feuser
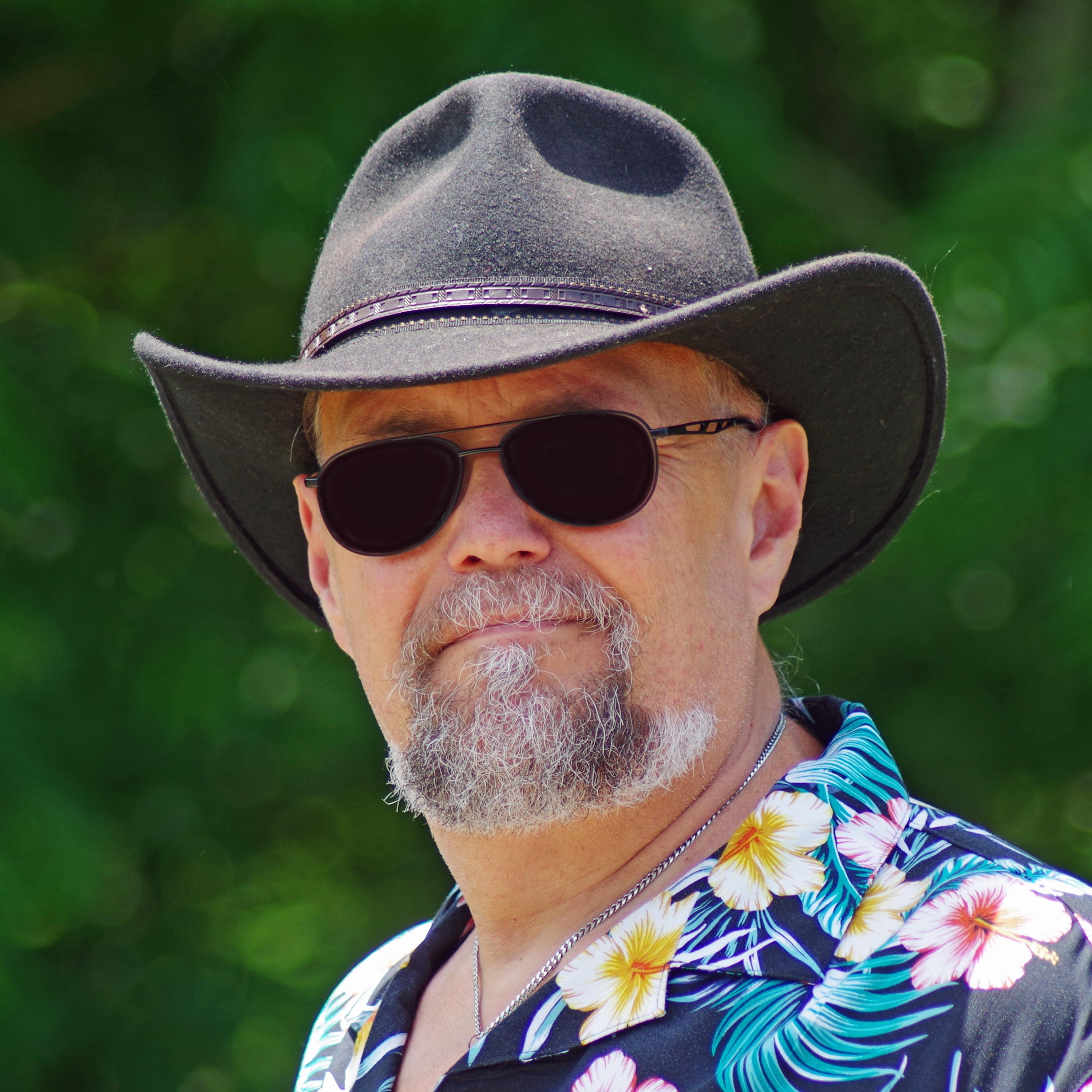
- Born: 26 March 1962 (age 64); Rheinbach, West Germany
- Education: German Sport University Cologne
- Occupations: Consultant, author, journalist, TV host
- Spouse(s): Susanne Preisinger, née Zachert (1987–2012); Karen Elaine Preisinger, née Hornback (since 2016)
- Children: 5
- Writing career
- Genres: Fiction, paranormal phenomena, travel, history
- Website: mig-feuser.com

Michael Mig Feuser (born 26 March 1962 in Rheinbach under the name Michael Preisinger) is a German-American consultant, journalist, artist, author and TV host.

== Life ==
Feuser, the son of a glass technician, grew up in the city of Düren in North-Rhine-Westphalia, aside from a two-year stay in eastern Bavaria. After graduating at the Wirteltor-High School in 1981 he started to study sports sciences at the German Sport University in Cologne. In 1986 he graduated as Diploma-Sports-Teacher. In the very same year he started as an officer of the reserve cadet at the tank Battalion 533 in Düren and finished his trainings in Munster/Lower Saxony.

Since 1989 he worked as track & field coach und studied history at the University of Cologne. In 1990 he published his non-fictional book Sprungwettbewerbe der Leichtathletik - Die Entwicklung Mittelalter bis 1896 (Jumping contests of Track & Field - The Development from the Medieval Ages until 1896), before he was working as scientific employee at the Institute for Sports History of the German Sports University. 1993 he organized an exhibition on the History of Track & Field Athletics in the city hall of Stuttgart on the occasion of the T&F World Championships.

Beside his writing activities for different magazines, he was working for the tourism industry and among other places lived in Nassau, Bahamas. There he wrote his book, published after his return to Europe, Das Bermuda-Rätsel gelöst (The Bermuda Riddle Solved) about the Bermuda Triangle, in the meantime translated in several languages like Italian, Romanian or Polish. 1997 Feuser received his doctor's degree at the German Sport University Cologne in History and Sociology.

From 1998 until 2003 Feuser worked as freelancer and later editor for the Schwäbische Zeitung (Swabian Newspaper), in this time he also published his third non-fictional book AUTEC-Navy-Basis - Offizieller Kontakt zu einer anderen Welt? (AUTEC-Navy-Base. Official Contact to another World? )

2004 he started his investigations for his fourth non-fictional book, which was published in the end of 2005 under the title Voodoo, Orisha & Co - Eine Reise zu den afrikanischen Religionen und Kulturen der Karibik (Voodoo, Orisha & Co - A Voyage to the African Religions and Cultures of the Caribbean).

Since moving from Lake Constance to the Baltic Sea in 2005 Feuser was working for different media, among other projects he hosted together with Aiman Abdallah an episode of the Pro7-Show Galileo-Mystery on the Bermuda-Triangle.

In 2016 Feuser moved to the United States, since then working as an author, consultant and journalist, working among others for the German television station WELT Nachrichten and several print media.

In 2022 the books Voodoo, Orisha & Co - A Voyage to the African Religions and Cultures of the Caribbean, AUTEC Navy Base - Secret Contacts to Aliens? Or Crazy Conspiracy Theories?, and Staying Alive With Intuition - How the Sixth Sense Helps in Everyday Life and Critical Situations were published.

Feuser lives with his wife Karen Elaine Preisinger, née Hornback, in Adair County, Kentucky, USA, where he wrote for the local newspapers The Adair Progress and later the Adair County Community Voice.

== Works ==
- Sprungwettbewerbe der Leichtathletik - Die Entwicklung Mittelalter bis 1896, Frankfurt/Bern/New York/Paris 1990, ISBN 3-631-42958-4
- Das Bermuda-Rätsel gelöst. Taucher finden Beweise auf den Bahamas und Florida Keys, Munich 1997, ISBN 3-7844-2671-9 (also as soft cover Munich 1999, ISBN 3-426-77376-7)
- Ursprünge der Leichtathletik. Laufen, Springen und Werfen von den Philanthropen bis zum Ende des 19. Jahrhunderts, Doctorate at the Sports University Cologne, as microfiche at all German universities
- Zagadka trójkta Bermudzkiego Rozwizana. Po raz pierwszy potwierdzone dowody istnienia wrót do innych wymiarów i wiatów, Warsaw 1998, ISBN 83-7245-089-7
- Il Triangolo delle Bermude. Una spedizione svela il mistero dell' "archipelago maledetto", Casale Monferrato 1999, ISBN 88-384-4168-5
- Bermudu. Trijstura Mikla Atmineta, Riga 1999, ISBN 9984-645-01-0
- Triunghiul Bermudelor. Elucidarea Enigmei, Bucharest 1999, ISBN 973-9439-53-5
- AUTEC-Navy-Basis. Offizieller Kontakt zu einer anderen Welt?, Obergünzburg 1999, Verlag UFO-Nachrichten
- Voodoo, Orisha & Co - Eine Reise zu den afrikanischen Kulturen und Religionen der Karibik, Norderstedt 2005, ISBN 3-8334-3705-7
- Das Krokodil im Salzhaff, in Ostsee-Anzeiger 2007
- Voodoo, Orisha & Co - Eine Reise zu den afrikanischen Kulturen und Religionen der Karibik, 2. erw. Aufl. Psi Pro Media 2022, ISBN 979-8826208588
- Voodoo, Orisha, & Co - A Voyage to the African Cultures and Religions of the Caribbean, Psi Pro Media 2022, ISBN 979-8821006448
- AUTEC Navy Base - Secret Contact to Aliens? Or Crazy Conspiracy Theories, Psi Pro Media 2022, ISBN 979-8823694162
- Staying Alive With Intuition - How the Sixth Sense Helps in Everyday Life and Critical Situations, Psi Pro Media 2022, ISBN 979-8823851916

== Appearances on TV ==
- 1995 Hosting a track & field broadcast for ZNS Bahamas Television
- 1998 Sat1 Frühstücksfernsehen, interview with Andreas Franke
- 1998 Schiejok täglich at ORF, interview with Walter Schiejok
- 1998 Vera am Mittag on Sat1, expert on the subject ghosts at Vera Int Veen
- 2001 interview on the subject Bermuda Triangle in an episode of Encounters with the Unexplained by Grizzly Adams Productions for the complete US-market
- 2008 Co-hosting of Galileo-Mystery at Pro7 on the Bermuda-Triangle on 11 July
- 2008 - 2016 hosting fake-documentations on TV Rostock, up to now broadcast resp. shot: The Crocodile in the Salzhaff, From Schmarl into the Bermuda-Triangle, The Duce's Treasure on Wustrow, The Werewolf in the Kühlung, The Witch-Burning of Nienhagen
