= Stefan Raetz =

German politician

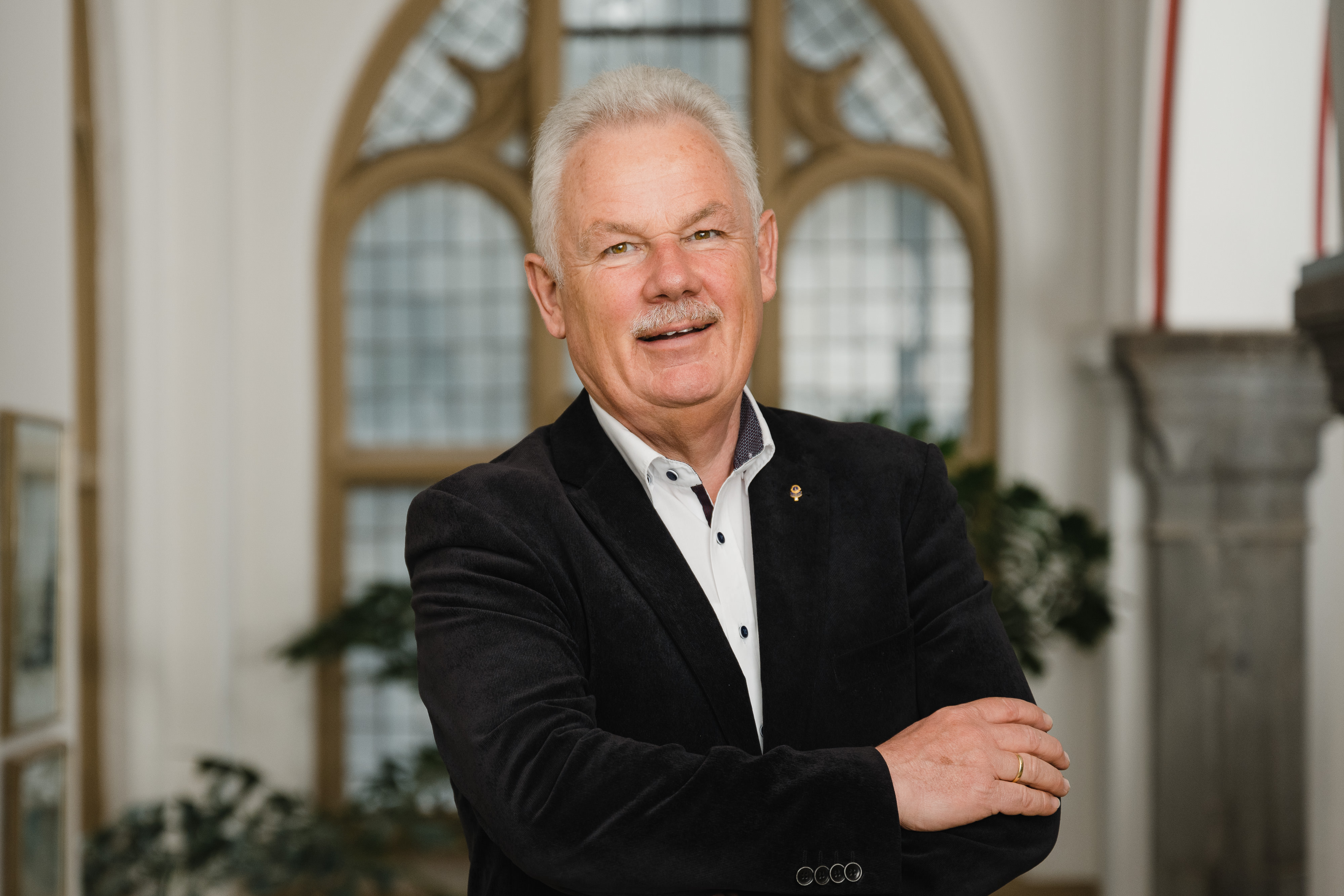
Stefan Raetz 2023

Stefan Raetz (born 24 February 1959 in Flensburg) is a German lawyer and politician. A member of the Christian Democratic Union, he served as the full-time mayor of Rheinbach in North Rhine-Westphalia from 1999 to 2020.

== Life ==
After graduating from high school and serving as a temporary soldier (German: Zeitsoldat) with the German Navy (Bundeswehr), Raetz studied legal science at the University of Bonn from 1981. He completed his studies on 5th. In March 1988 with the first Staatsexamen. He completed his legal traineeship in the legal preparatory service of the state of North Rhine-Westphalia. He then studied at the German University of Administrative Sciences Speyer. This was followed by the second Staatsexamen on 15 October 1991. Until 30 June 1994 Raetz was head of the legal office and the main and personnel office in Luckenwalde. He was also the first deputy to the mayor.

On 1 July 1994, Stefan Raetz was elected first associate (German: Erster Beigeordneter) in Rheinbach and was responsible for the planning, school, cultural, sports and social services. In the 1999 NRW communal elections, he was elected mayor of Rheinbach with 55.6% of the votes cast. He resigned on 1st Oktober 1999. In the 2004 NRW communal elections he received 63.4% of the vote, 71.2% in 2009 and 64.9% in 2014. To the election on 13 September 2020 Raetz did not resume in, and Ludger Banken was elected as his successor.

On the 9th In March 2000, Raetz became a member of the legal, constitutional, personnel and organisation committee of the North Rhine-Westphalia Association of Towns and Municipalities, of which he was deputy chairman from 2005 to 2010.

Since 6 April 2005 Raetz is a member of the presidium. On 2 June 2010 he was elected chairman of the Committee on Urban Design, Construction and Regional Planning of the North Rhine-Westphalia Association of Town and Municipalities.

Raetz is married and has a son.

== Honours ==
- Award ceremony for the honorary citizenship of the city of Rheinbach on 31 October 2023

=== Other honorary positions, election functions ===
- Chairman German Red Cross Voreifel (German: Deutsches Rotes Kreuz Voreifel) in 2025
