= Karl Eschweiler =

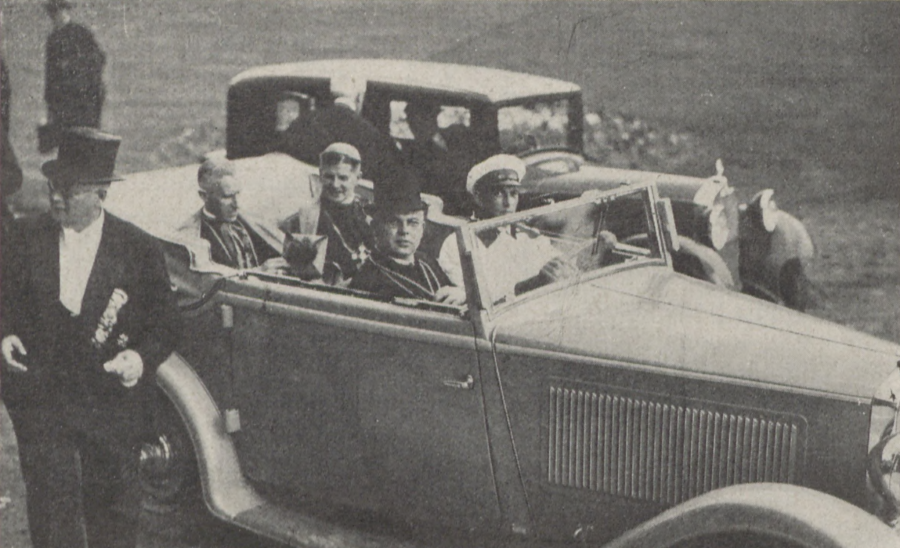
Karl Eschweiler on the steering wheel

Karl Eschweiler (5 September 1886 – 30 September 1936) was an academic Catholic theologian in Germany, who, as a so-called brown priest, publicly promoted cooperation and reconciliation between the church and the Nazi regime from 1933 onwards. He believed that a dictatorship would benefit the church, as it would stem the tide of secularist modernism that he saw as eroding the church’s authority.

== Early life and education ==
Karl Eschweiler was born at Euskirchen, Cologne on September 5, 1886. He entered the city’s Catholic seminary before studying for a Doctorate of Philosophy (D. Phil) at Munich (awarded 1909). He wrote his dissertation on the aesthetic elements in St Augustine's philosophy of religion. On completion of his doctoral studies, Eschweiler returned to the seminary, and was ordained priest in the Archdiocese of Cologne in 1910. He served initially as a parish priest before pursuing full-time doctoral studies in theology at Bonn University. At the time of the Weimar Republic, Bonn was a centre for ‘progressive’ Catholic scholarship.

== Theological development ==
In his Habilitationsschrift (1922), Eschweiler embraced modernism, still suspect in the Roman Catholic Church after its condemnation by Pius X. He drew particularly on the thought of Enlightenment theologian Johann Michael Sailer, addressing himself here (and in articles such as the 1926 work ‘die zwei Wege der neueren Theologie’), to questions of the role of human intellect in the knowledge of God, and of how the grace of God could ‘perfect’ human nature in modern, mass society so that people could live ‘fuller’ lives with a disposition towards God. At the same time, he also began his critique of the state as he experienced it in the Weimar Republic.

For him, the (Roman Catholic) church has, through its doctrines, liturgy, instruments and structures, an objective reality. Through it, Jesus Christ is present in history. Eschweiler argued that it had an authority similar to that of the state, though each exercises sovereignty in its respective arena. The state is sovereign over all other governing authorities provided it does not usurp the authority that rightly belongs to the church. Although the individual, and the church, should obey legitimate civil authority, Eschweiler argues that the Weimar regime was not such an authority, urging that the church should support a shift to an authoritarian state – provided this demonstrated a receptivity to the ongoing Christ. He saw Weimar as espousing diversity (bad in itself, in his view), with a liberal individualist concept of rights, and noted that Article 137 of the Weimar Constitution stated that there exists no state church. In Eschweiler's view, a powerful corrective to the chaos that, ethnically, morally, and religiously tolerant Weimar democracy had brought to Germany, was needed. An authoritarian – but not totalitarian - state, supported by a powerful church with its own legitimate sphere of action free from state interference, and to which the state's leaders were accountable, was the (transitional) solution Eschweiler saw as necessary. Eschweiler maintained that the Protestant and Catholic churches were witness to God's revelation, and that while the state was ultimately accountable to God, it was indirectly accountable to the church as God's proper representative on earth.

== Theology under the Nazi regime ==
By 1928, Eschweiler was teaching theology at the Theological Faculty at Braunsberg in Prussia. The accession to power of Hitler in 1933 brought Eschweiler as dean of the Hochschule into conflict with his Ermland diocesan bishop, Maximilian Kaller, a redoubtable opponent of the Nazi regime. However, Eschweiler continued to advocate support for Hitler's project in articles such as ‘Die Kirche im neuen Reich’, arguing that Nazism and Pius XI’s vision of a corporate state are compatible. He joined the Nazi party in May 1933, believing that Nazism should recognise the church’s role in strengthening the German people, and that previously-extant church-supported political parties were now no longer needed. He supported the 1933 law legitimising sterilisation of ‘unfit’ people, which made him unpopular with Kaller and his own students, and led Cardinal Pacelli, Vatican Secretary of State in Germany, to instigate canonical proceedings against him. As a result, he was suspended from priestly ministry in August 1934 (together with his colleague, canonist Hans Barion), though reinstated in September 1935, having forsworn his support for the law. He was buried in his SA uniform.

== Sources ==
- Dempf, Alois (1969) Fortschrittliche Intelligenz nach dem ersten Weltkrieg, in Hochland 61 (1969), pp 234 – 42
- Drumm, Joachim (1996) ’Eschweiler, Karl’ in Lexikon für Theologie und Kirche, Freiburg: Herder 1993–2001 (vol 5) (3rd edition)
- Eschweiler, Karl (1926) Die zwei Wege der neueren Theologie, Augsburg: Benno Filser. Digital Edition, ed. by Thomas Marschler (2010)
- Eschweiler, Karl (1928) Die Philosophie der spanischen Spätscholastik auf den deutschen Universitäten des siebzehnten Jahrhunderts, in: Spanische Forschungen der Görres-Gesellschaft I, Aschendorff, Münster 1928, 251-325.
- Eschweiler, Karl (1930) Johann Adam Möhlers Kirchenbegriff: Das Hauptstück der katholischen Auseninandersetzung mit der deutschen Idealismus, Braunsberg: Herder
- Eschweiler, Karl (1933) Die Kirche im neuen Reich, in Deutsches Volkstum 15 (June 1933), pp 451 – 458
- Heiber, Helmut (1994) Universität unterm Hakenkreuz (Part 2, volume 2), Munich: Saur.
- Krieg, Robert (2004) Catholic Theologians in Nazi Germany New York: Continuum.
- Marschler, Thomas (2004), Kirchenrecht im Bannkreis Carl Schmitts. Hans Barion vor und nach 1945. Bonn: nova & vetera.
- Eschweiler, Karl (2010), Die katholische Theologie im Zeitalter des deutschen Idealismus. Die Bonner theologischen Qualifikationsschriften von 1921/22. Aus dem Nachlaß herausgegeben und mit einer Einleitung versehen von Thomas Marschler. Münster: Monsenstein und Vannerdat 2010. LXXII + 302 S., 19.50 Euro. ISBN 978-3-86991-180-9.
- Marschler, Thomas, Karl Eschweiler (1886–1936). Theologische Erkenntnislehre und nationalsozialistische Ideologie = Quellen und Studien zur neueren Theologiegeschichte 9 (Regensburg 2011).
