= Voreifel Railway =

Railway line in the German state of North Rhine-Westphalia

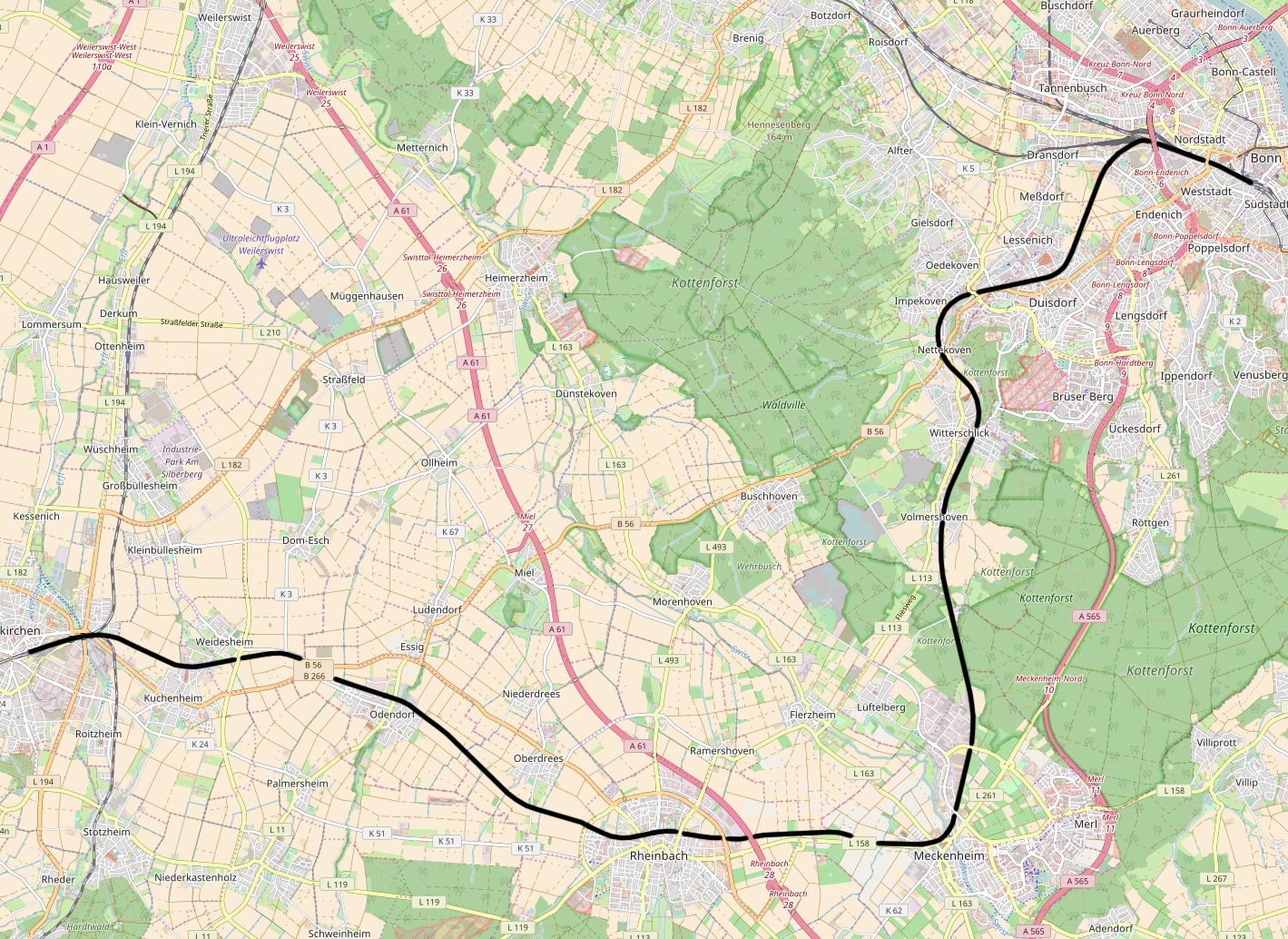

Overview
- Native name: Voreifelbahn
- Line number: 2645
- Locale: North Rhine-Westphalia, Germany
- Termini: Bonn Hbf; Euskirchen

Service
- Route number: 475

Technical
- Line length: 34.2 km (21.3 mi)
- Number of tracks: 2: Bonn Hbf–Bonn-Duisdorf; Meckenheim-Kottenforst–Rheinbach; Kuchenheim–Euskirchen
- Track gauge: 1,435 mm (4 ft 8 1/2 in) standard gauge
- Operating speed: 110 km/h (68.4 mph) (maximum)

The Voreifel Railway (German: Voreifelbahn) is a partly double track, non-electrified main line in the Voreifel from Bonn to Euskirchen in the German state of North Rhine-Westphalia (KBS 475).

== History ==
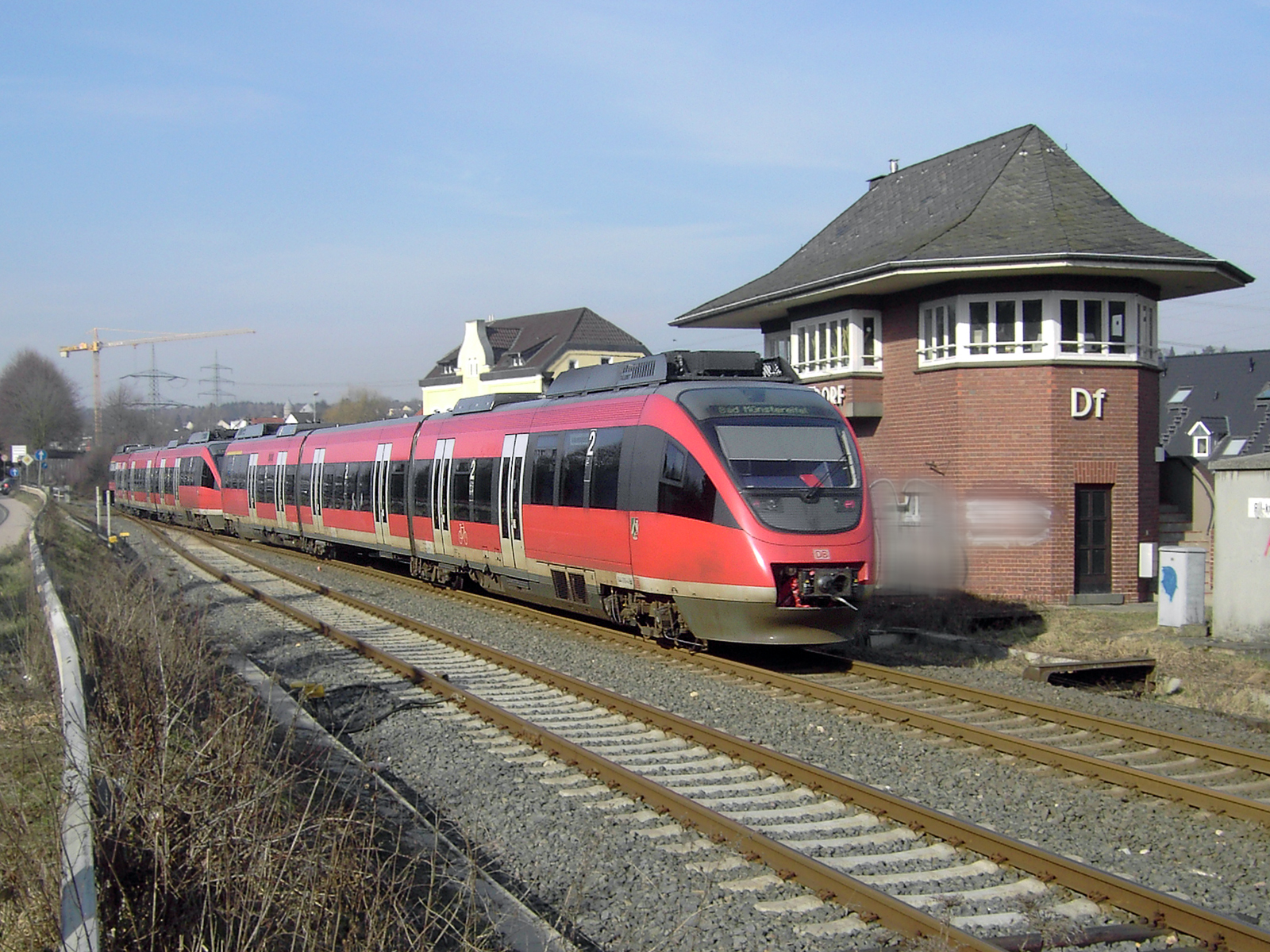
The signal box in Bonn-Duisdorf, heritage-listed since 2010.

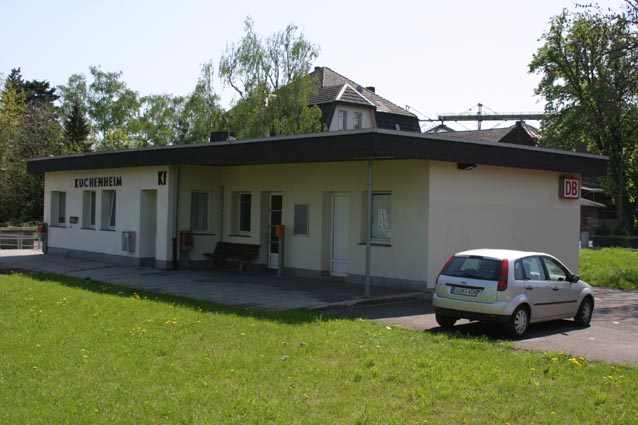
Kuchenheim station, May 2005

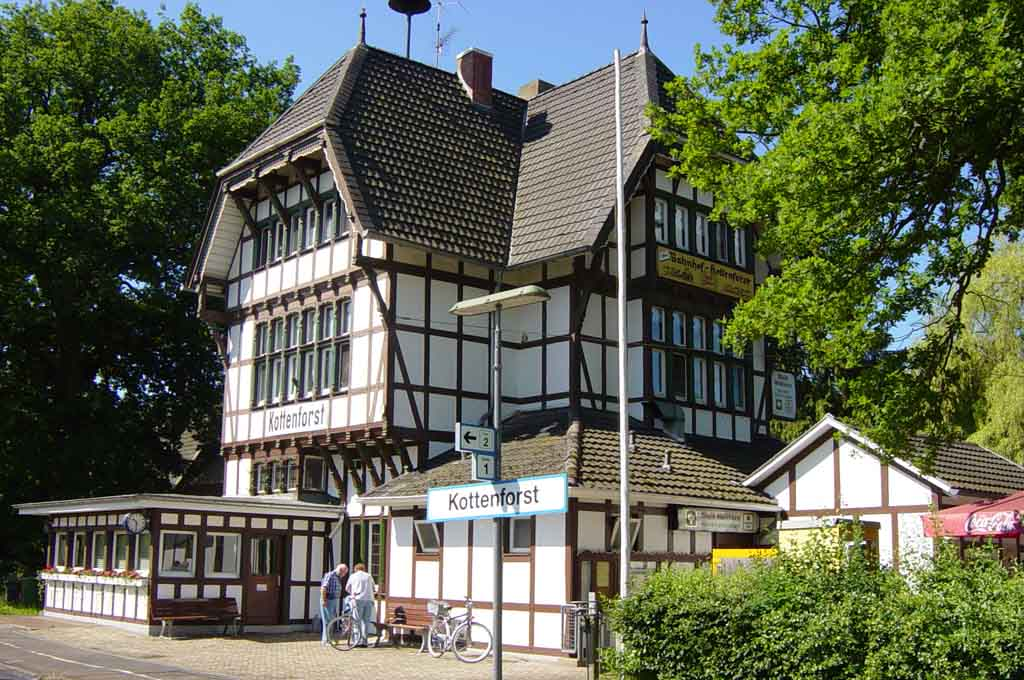
Kottenforst station

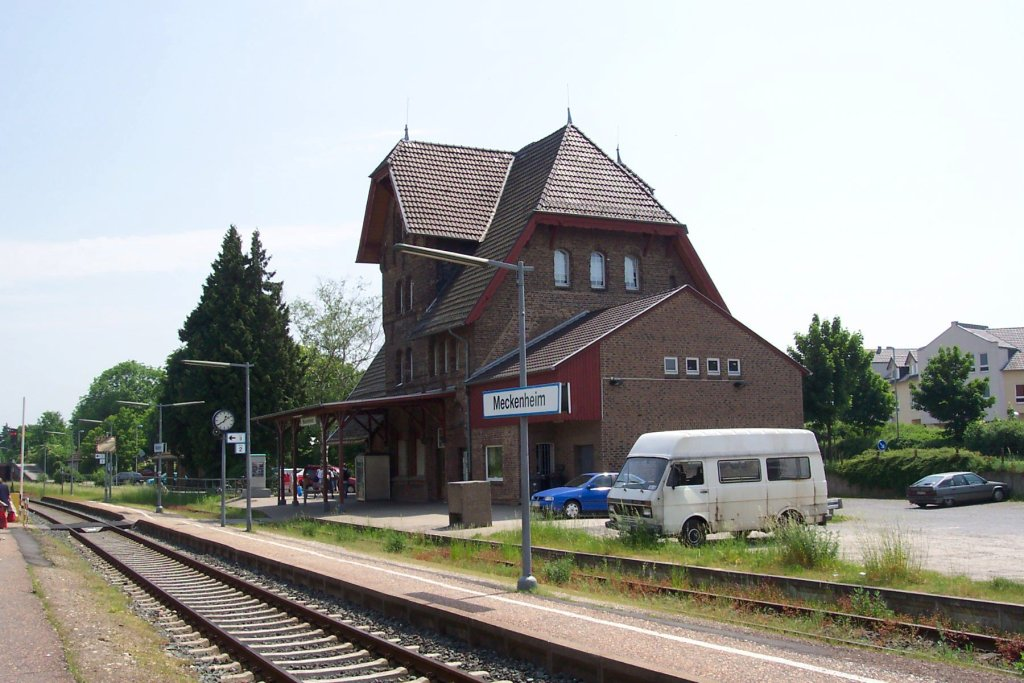
Meckenheim (Bz Köln) station before the raising of the platform

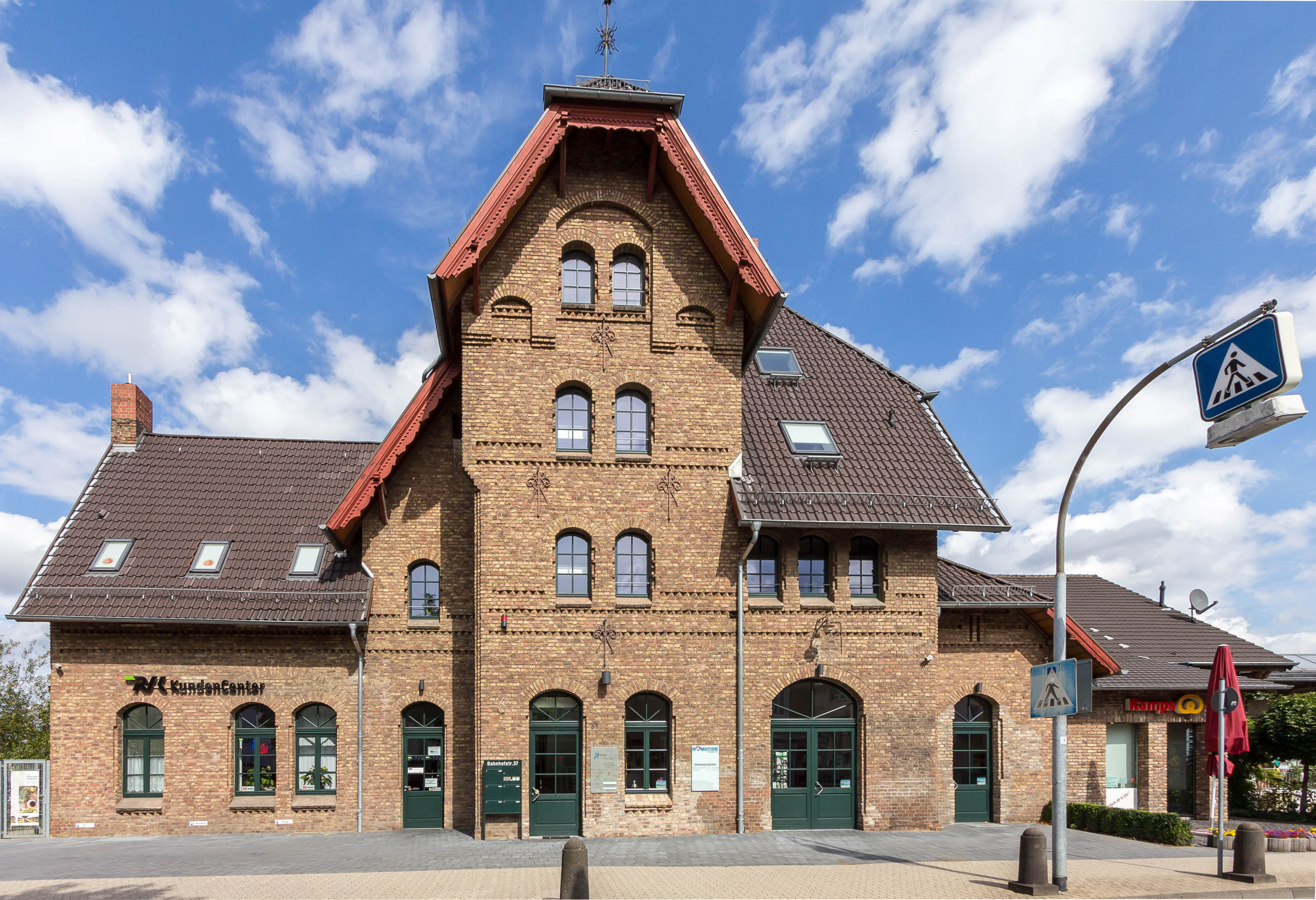
Former Rheinbach station building (now privatised)

=== Opening of the line ===
The Voreifel Railway was opened on 7 June 1880. The station buildings at Bonn-Duisdorf, Kottenforst, Meckenheim (Bz Köln), Rheinbach, Odendorf and Kuchenheim (spelt Cuchenheim until 1936) were built at this time. The other buildings stations between Duisdorf and Kottenforst were based on designs by Johannes Richter (1842–1889) and built from clinker brick. The station buildings of Duisdorf, Odendorf and Kuchenheim were built on the same plan. The station buildings of Meckenheim and Rheinbach were built to a slightly modified plan with Meckenheim and Rheinbach built in mirror-image to each other.

The line was originally built as a branch line and upgraded in later years as a main line. The maximum development of the line and its stations was achieved in the 1930s and 1940s. The line was then slowly downgraded to its present condition.

In the postwar years, the line was called the Kappes-Express ("Cabbage Express") as it met the fate of many other lines: the second track was removed on more and more sections and passenger numbers declined as the timetable continued to be thinned in line with demand. At the end of the 1970s, the Voreifel Railway was still used by 3,000 passengers each day. Services on the line were threatened with more cuts in the short term and with closure in the medium term. In 1979, the service was temporarily intensified significantly to provide trains every half-hour during the daytime on week days and hourly on weekends. As a result, passenger numbers rose significantly.

=== Changes to the line ===
- From 1880:

Bonn Hbf (West Rhine Railway) – Duisdorf – (Meckenheim-)Kottenforst – Meckenheim – Rheinbach – Odendorf – Cuchenheim – Euskirchen (Eifel Railway)

- From September 1881:

Bonn Hbf – Duisdorf – Impekoven (Witterschlick) [km 7.9] – Kottenforst – Meckenheim – Rheinbach – Odendorf – Cuchenheim – Euskirchen

- From October 1890:

Bonn Hbf – Duisdorf – Impekoven (Witterschlick) – Kottenforst – Meckenheim – Rheinbach – Odendorf – Cuchenheim – Euskirchen;
other trains ran partly over the Börde Railway to Düren

- From August 1903:

Bonn Hbf – Bonn-Duisdorf – Impekoven [km 7.9] – Witterschlick [km 9.8] – Kottenforst – Meckenheim – Rheinbach – Odendorf – Cuchenheim – Euskirchen;
other trains ran partly over the Börde Railway to Düren

- From January 1923 to June 1923: duplication of the line with material from the unfinished Neuss–Rheinbach–Dernau railway (the Strategische Bahndamm—Strategic Railway Embankment):

Bonn Hbf = Bonn-Duisdorf = Impekoven = Witterschlick = Kottenforst = Meckenheim = Rheinbach = Odendorf = Cuchenheim = Euskirchen;
other trains ran partly over the Börde Railway to Düren

- At the end of the 1960s with the beginning of the reduction of the line to single-track

Bonn Hbf = Bonn-Duisdorf – (Alfter-)Witterschlick – (Meckenheim-)Kottenforst = Meckenheim = Rheinbach – (Swisttal-)Odendorf – (Euskirchen-)Kuchenheim = Euskirchen;
other trains ran partly over the Börde Railway to Düren and continued to Aachen

- From 1996:

Bonn Hbf = Bonn-Duisdorf – (Alfter-)Witterschlick – (Meckenheim-)Kottenforst (only Sat/Sun) = Meckenheim (Bz Köln)-Industriepark = Meckenheim = Rheinbach – (Swisttal-)Odendorf – (Euskirchen-)Kuchenheim = Euskirchen;
some trains continue over the Erft Valley Railway to Bad Münstereifel. Continuation from Bonn via Remagen and the Ahr Valley Railway to Ahrbrück is considered.

Explanation:
- single-track section
= double track section
The names in brackets are municipalities that are not officially included in the name of the station (which is usual practice in Germany).

=== Development since the rail reform ===
The city of Bonn in 1994 used the railway reform to improve transport services by funding additional services. From 1994 services ran at 15-minute intervals during the peak between Bonn and Witterschlick; in 1995 this service was extended to Rheinbach. As a result, passenger numbers soared. In 1996, the new Meckenheim Industriepark station opened.

The Verkehrsverbund Rhein-Sieg (Rhine-Sieg Transport Association, VRS) in 1996 called for tenders to operate diesel services on the Voreifel Railway, Eifel Railway and the Oberbergische Bahn (Upper Bergian Railway) service from Cologne to Marienheide. Since June 1998, the line has been operated by DB Regio NRW with newly acquired Talent (class 644) diesel multiple units. In addition, the upgrading of the line began.

With the exception of Meckenheim station, the line is completely equipped with high platforms. Bonn-Duisdorf station, which was reduced to a single platform in 1993, was rebuilt between 2003 and 2004 as a two-platform station. The signal equipment was renewed and rebuilt with high platforms.

In September 2011, an electronic interlocking was completed in Euskirchen. As a result, the seven old signal boxes on the line were closed.

== Planning ==
Planning is underway on the development of a continuous double track line on the Bonn–Witterschlick section and the construction of four new stations: Bonn-Endenich Nord (at km 2.2), Bonn-Helmholtzstraße (km 4.4), Alfter-Impekoven (km 7.1, not at site of the former Witterschlick/Impekoven, which was at a peripheral location near federal highway 56, but at the level crossing near Oedekoven) and Rheinbach Römerkanal. For operational reasons, the line will be realigned in the area of Bonn freight yard, a turnback track will be built in Rheinbach and the control and signalling technology will be upgraded on the whole section. The work is estimated to cost €33 million and will be carried out from January 2013 to June 2015. In the summer of 2014, the line will be closed for several weeks. The Witterschlick–Kottenforst line will not be duplicated because a two-track line cannot be built on a slope that is considered to be geologically unstable.

The timetable between Rheinbach and Bonn will be augmented during the peak hour. This makes the duplication necessary. The start of construction was announced by Deutsche Bahn (DB) in 2005. Work has been delayed according to Deutsche Bahn because of proceedings before the Higher Administrative Court (Oberverwaltungsgericht), lack of financial commitments by the state, ongoing construction work on bridges and underpasses as well as planning and technical difficulties in providing alternative routes.

== Operations ==
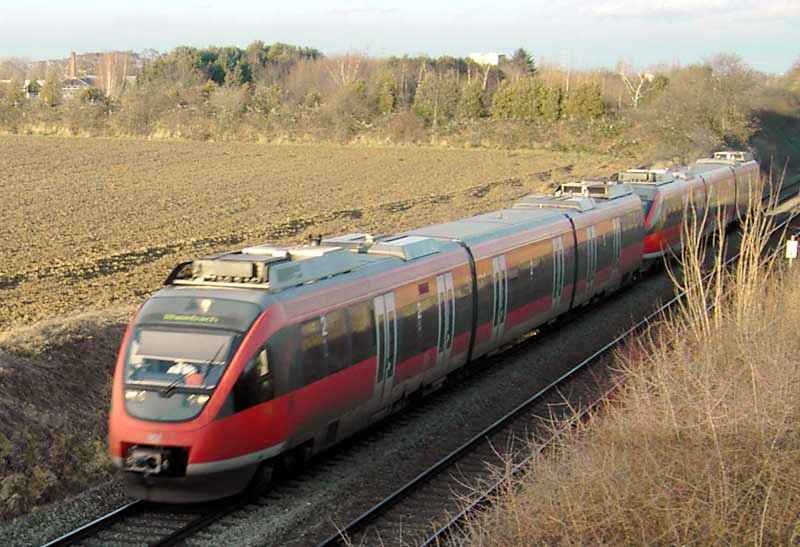
Bombardier Talent DMU between Bonn Hbf and Bonn-Duisdorf

The Voreifel Railway is served with an hourly Rhine-Ruhr S-Bahn service, the S23, which continues on the Erft Valley Railway to Bad Münstereifel as the RB 23 Regionalbahn service

- on weekdays services run every 30 minutes during the peak hour and between Bonn and the Rheinbach they operate every 15 minutes in the peak,
- on Sundays and holidays services operate hourly.

These services have been operated by DB Regio Rheinland using LINT railcars since December 2013.

== Fares ==
Rail services on the Voreifel Railway are included in the fare zone of Verkehrsverbund Rhein-Sieg (Rhine-Sieg Transport Association, VRS) as well as the larger NRW fare zone.
