= Rheinbach =

- Town
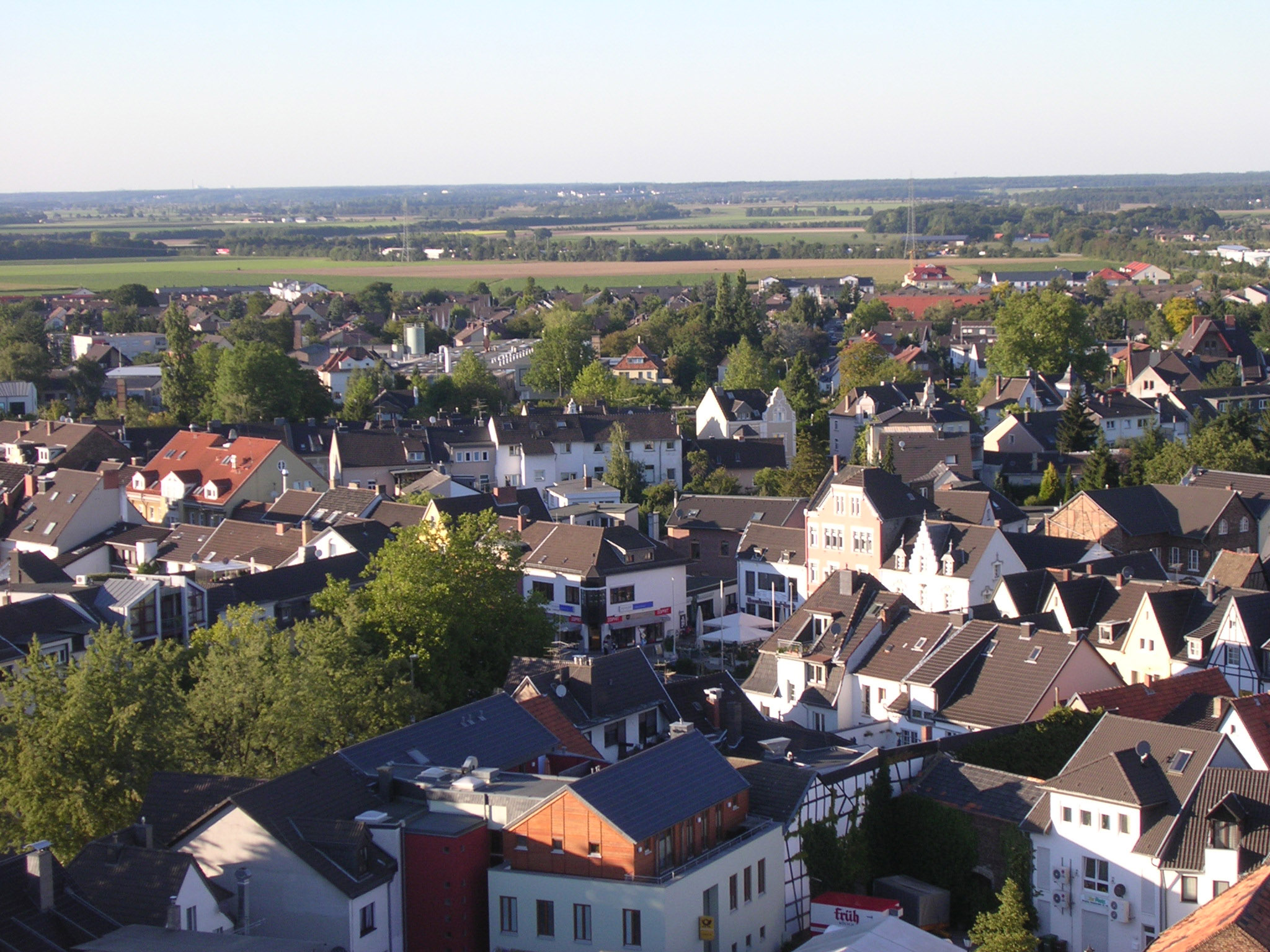
- Aerial view of Rheinbach

- Flag Coat of arms

- Location of Rheinbach within Rhein-Sieg-Kreis district
- Interactive map of Rheinbach
- Location within Germany Location within North Rhine-Westphalia
- Coordinates: 50°38′N 6°57′E
- Country: Germany
- State: North Rhine-Westphalia
- Admin. region: Cologne
- District: Rhein-Sieg-Kreis
- Subdivisions: 9

Government
  - Mayor (2020–25): Ludger Banken

Area
  - Total: 69.72 km^{2} (26.92 sq mi)
- Elevation: 173 m (568 ft)

Population (2025-12-31)
  - Total: 27,012
  - Density: 387.4/km^{2} (1,003/sq mi)
- Time zone: UTC+01:00 (CET)
  - Summer (DST): UTC+02:00 (CEST)
- Postal codes: 53359
- Dialling codes: 02226
- Vehicle registration: SU
- Website: www.rheinbach.de

Rheinbach (German pronunciation: [ˈʁaɪnbax]) is a town in the Rhein-Sieg-Kreis district (Landkreis), in North Rhine-Westphalia, Germany. It belongs to the administrative district (Regierungsbezirk) of Cologne.

== Geography ==
Situated 15 km (9 mi) south-west of Bonn and 35 km (22 mi) south of Cologne, Rheinbach lies at the edge of the Eifel region and within the borders of the Rhineland Nature Park (Naturpark Rheinland).

== History ==
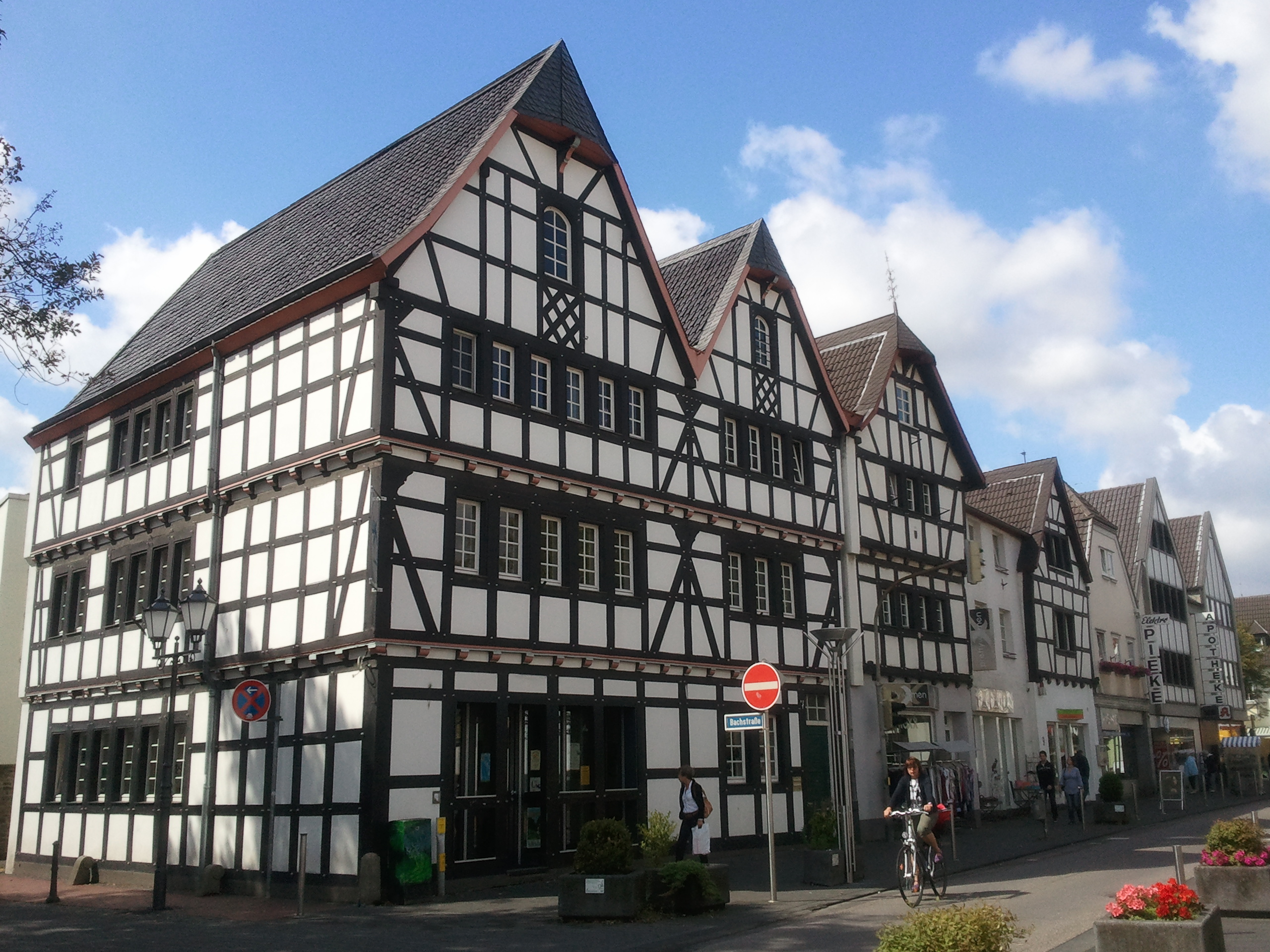
Timbered houses on the main street

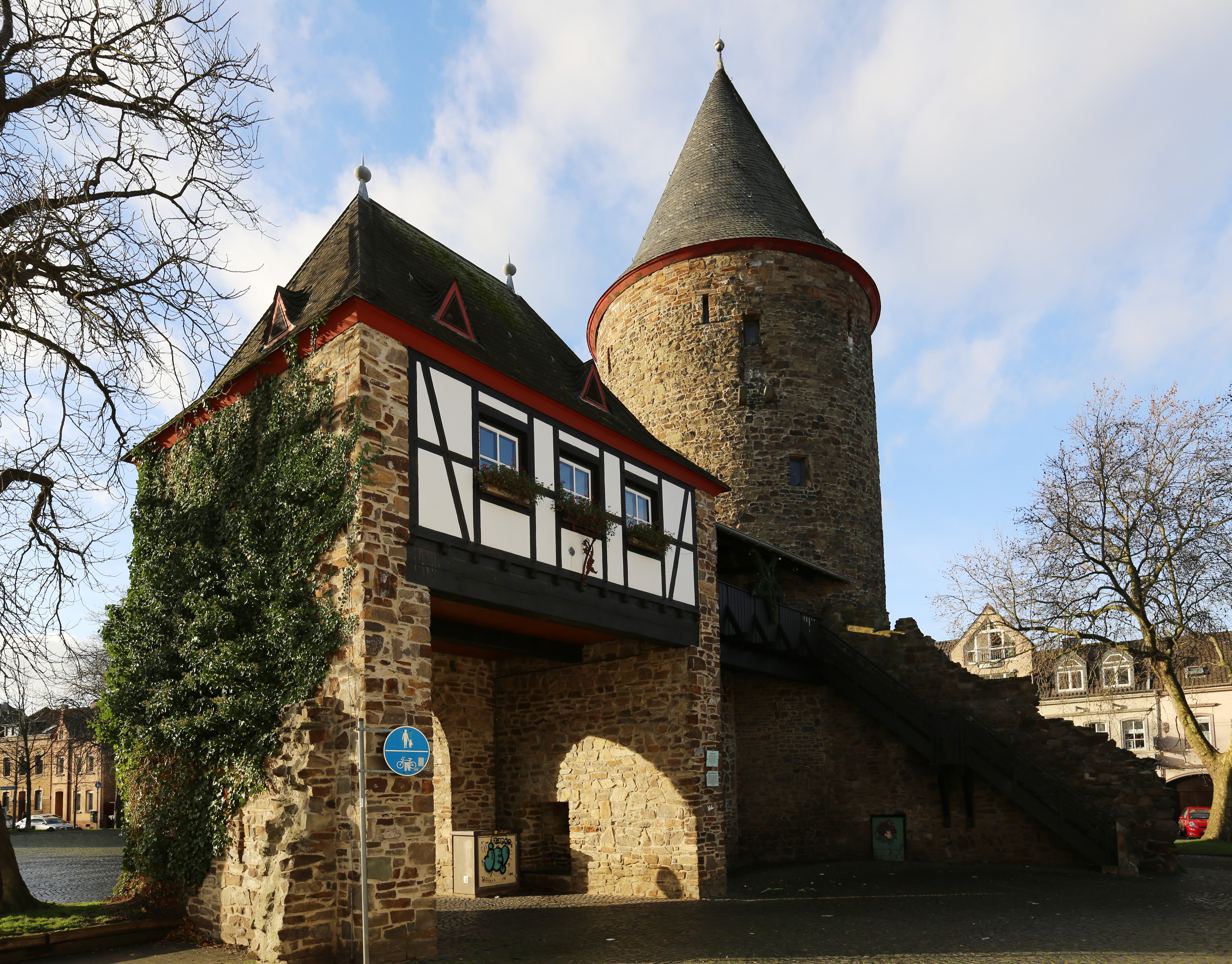
Medieval fortification, partly constructed on the remains of the Roman aqueduct

Around 80 AD, the Eifel Aqueduct, one of the longest aqueducts of the Roman Empire, was running through what is today Rheinbach's town centre. The first written documentation of Rheinbach dates back to 762, when Pepin the Short, then King of the Franks, gave lands to the Prüm Abbey. In the early 17th century, Rheinbach came to prominence because of its witch hunts.

First referred to as a town in 1298, the Archbishop of Cologne purchased Rheinbach and the surrounding villages in 1343. Till 1789, Rheinbach was part of the Electorate of Cologne. In 1794, Rheinbach was incorporated into France within the Département de Rhin-et-Moselle before coming under the auspices of Prussia in 1815.

Around 1947, a considerable number of displaced people from the Sudetenland settled in Rheinbach. Having brought their traditions of glasscraft, Rheinbach became famous for its glass art and today hosts a glass art museum and a specialized school.

=== Coat of arms ===
The coat of arms was made official in 1915 by Wilhelm II, German Emperor and King of Prussia. The black cross with the silver background stands for the Roman Catholic Archdiocese of Cologne. The Eagle stems from the coat of arms from the Counts of Are-Hochstaden. The blue key refers to the Holy Saint Peter, the patron saint of the Archdiocese of Cologne.

== Population ==
Historical population

Year	Pop.	±% p.a.
1965	15,954	—
1970	18,824	+3.36%
1975	21,359	+2.56%
1980	21,842	+0.45%
1985	22,243	+0.36%
1990	22,990	+0.66%
1995	24,733	+1.47%

Year	Pop.	±% p.a.
2000	25,943	+0.96%
2005	26,533	+0.45%
2010	27,392	+0.64%
2015	27,224	−0.12%
2020	26,949	−0.20%
2025	27,012	+0.05%

Source: Landesdatabank Nordrhein-Westfalen

== Governance ==
Besides the town proper, Rheinbach administratively comprises the surrounding villages and hamlets, including Flerzheim.

As of 2025, the town council has a Christian Democratic (CDU) majority with 14 seats; the Social Democrats (SPD) hold 9 seats, while the Greens (Die Grünen) and the Independents (UWG) hold seven seats each, the Liberals (FDP) hold three.

== Education ==
A local hub for education, Rheinbach is the seat of the Hochschule Bonn-Rhein-Sieg, a university of applied science which specializes in business and biomedical sciences.

There are three secondary schools in Rheinbach. The municipal Gymnasium was founded in 1852 and is one of the oldest public secondary schools in the Bonn region; the Vinzenz-Pallotti-Kolleg was one of the few boarding and private schools in Germany; the Catholic run St.-Joseph-Gymnasium was historically a girls-only school and is now coeducational.

== Transport ==
Rheinbach lies in proximity to the Bundesautobahn 61 which connects it with Cologne and Koblenz (Rhineland-Palatinate). The S-Bahn RB23 (Voreifel Railway) connects Rheinbach with Bad Münstereifel and Bonn. Rheinbach is part of the regional bus network of Cologne (Regionalverkehr Köln).

== Culture and sports ==
Biggest local sports clubs in Rheinbach are the TC Rheinbach, TV Rheinbach and SC Rheinbach.

== Twin towns – sister cities ==
Rheinbach is twinned with:

- Deinze, Belgium
- Kamenický Šenov, Czech Republic
- Sevenoaks, England, United Kingdom
- Villeneuve-lès-Avignon, France
- "Partnership for Peace" (Partnerschaft des Friedens) with Douaumont-Vaux, France

Rheinbach and the similarly named town of Rhinebeck, New York, USA, participate in a student exchange program.

== Personalities ==
=== Notable people ===
- Peter Lavies (c. 1790 – c. 1876), American tavernkeeper, local official, postmaster, moneylender and legislator
- Hubert Lavies (1833–1905), American farmer, postmaster and legislator
- Frank Kolb (1945–2026), historian
- Michael Preisinger (born 1962), journalist and writer
- Norbert Röttgen (born 1965), politician, federal minister in 2009–2012
- Tim Lobinger (born 1972), pole vaulter
- Antoine Monot Jr. (born 1975), actor and film producer
- Markus Pröll (born 1979), footballer
- Pius Heinz (born 1989), winner of the Main Event of 2011 World Series of Poker

== Honorary citizen ==
People as follows have been conferred the title Honorary citizen of Rheinbach:

- Heinrich Kallenberg, August 28, 1995
- Hans Schellenberg, May 22, 2000
- Stefan Raetz, October 31, 2023

=== Mayor since 1797 ===
- 1797–1806: Peter Nachtsheim
- 1806–1814: Leopold Sarkander Wolff
- 1814–1847: Wilhelm Heinrich Ridde
- 1847–1848: Gottfried Joseph Wolff
- 1848–1856: Joseph Krahe (1848–1850 tmptary)
- 1856–1848: Ignaz Josef Neß
- 1884–1897: Emil Josef Neß
- 1897–1926: Karl Commeßmann (name founder: „Commeßmannstraße“, development area Rotterfeld)
- 1926–1933: Hans Reichard
- 1933–1945: Joseph Wiertz (instituted by NSDAP)
- 1945–1946: Hubert Schwarz
- 1946–1948: Johann Schäfer
- 1948–1963: Hans Hirschmann (CDU)
- 1963–1969: Hubert Mahlberg
- 1969–1989: Heinz Wilhelm Büttgenbach
- 1989–1999: Hans Schellenberger
- 1999–2020: Stefan Raetz (CDU), first full-time mayor
- 2020–2025: Ludger Banken (independent)
- 2025 Daniel Phiesel
