= Euskirchen station =

Railway halt in Euskirchen, Germany

Euskirchen
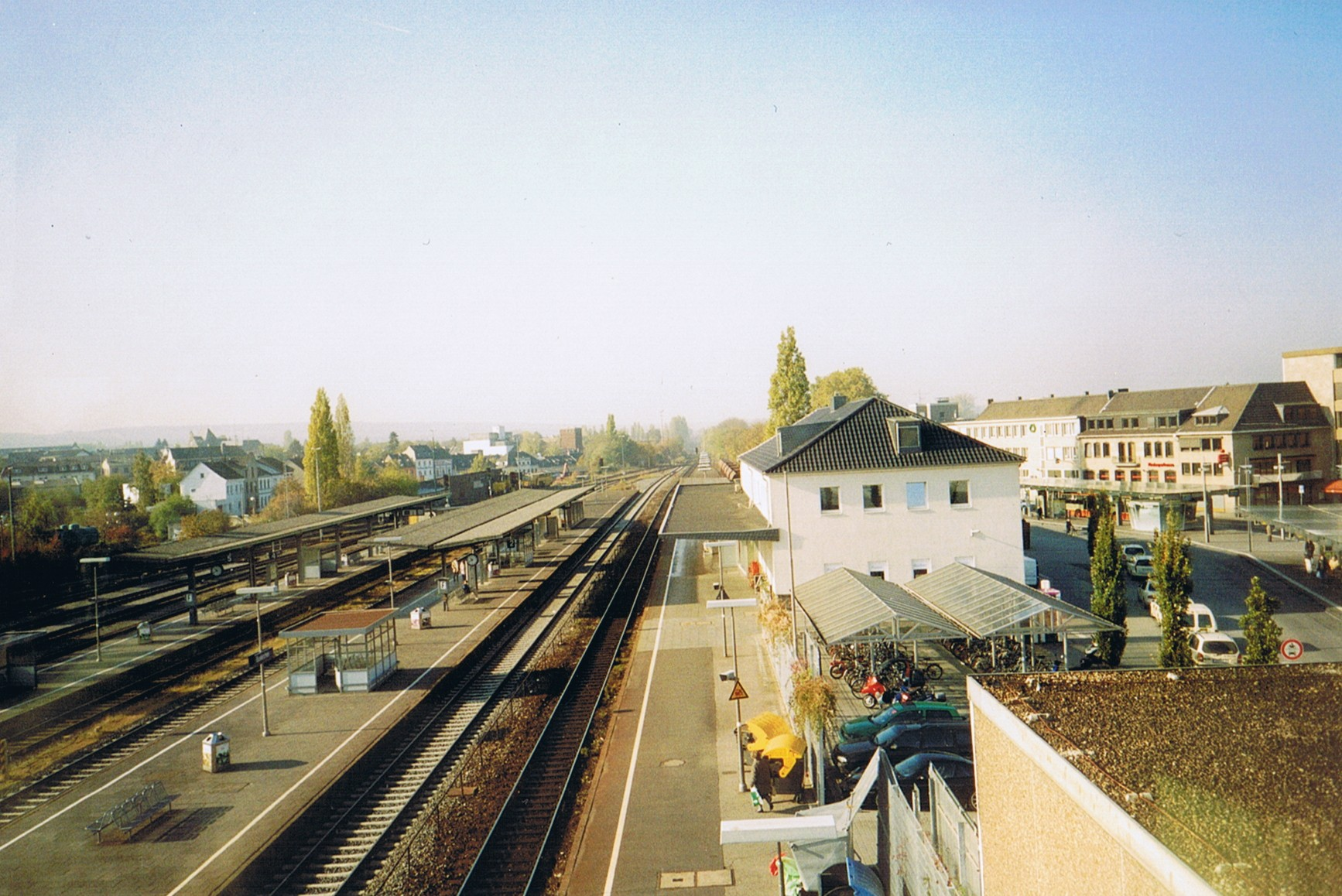

General information
- Location: Euskirchen, NRW; Germany
- Coordinates: 50°39′28″N 6°47′28″E
- Owner: Deutsche Bahn
- Operator: DB Netz; DB Station&Service
- Lines: Cologne–Trier; Bonn–Euskirchen; Euskirchen–Bad Münstereifel; Euskirchen–Düren
- Platforms: 5

Construction
- Accessible: Yes

Other information
- Station code: 1734
- DS100 code: HHML
- IBNR: 8000100
- Category: 3
- Fare zone: VRS: 2720
- Website: www.bahnhof.de

History
- Opened: 1864

Passengers
- 16,000

Services
| Preceding station | DB Regio NRW | Following station |
|---|---|---|
| Mechernich towards Trier Hbf | RE 12 | Weilerswist towards Köln Messe/Deutz |
| Mechernich towards Gerolstein | RE 22 | Weilerswist towards Köln Messe/Deutz |
| Euskirchen Zuckerfabrik towards Bad Münstereifel | RB 23 | Terminus |
| Satzvey towards Gerolstein | RB 24 | Euskirchen-Großbüllesheim towards Köln Messe/Deutz |
| Preceding station | Rurtalbahn | Following station |
| Nemmenich towards Düren | RB 28 | Terminus |
| Preceding station | Cologne S-Bahn | Following station |
| Terminus | S23 | Euskirchen-Kuchenheim towards Bonn Hbf |
Location

Euskirchen station is an important transport hub with heavy commuter traffic in the German state of North Rhine-Westphalia. It is it situated on Cologne–Trier, Bonn–Euskirchen, Euskirchen–Bad Münstereifel and the Euskirchen–Düren lines. The station is located on Alleestraße (street) on the Pützberg (hill) and is the largest station in the district.

== History ==
The first Euskirchen station was built in 1846 in a neoclassical style, far outside the then city centre on the Pützberg. The station was considered to be a "business card" for the city and was the starting point for any parades and pageants through the city. The forecourt was planned as a park and construction began on a green space around a central war memorial, which was completed on 24 May 1903. Thus lawns, hedges and trees were created in front of the station building. As traffic has increased dramatically, the plaza has been redesigned several times. The entire rail infrastructure continued to grow steadily and at that time housed a water tower, a freight shed, an engine shed, a turntable and five signal boxes. In May 1928 the war memorial was moved to Hindenburgplatz. In the 1930s, the trees and lawns slowly disappeared. At the end of 1944 the entire site, including the station building, was destroyed permanently during violent and systematic bombing by the Allies.

Lines were opened as follows:

- 2 October 1864: Euskirchen–Düren
- 1871: Euskirchen–Trier
- 1 October 1875: Euskirchen–Cologne
- 7 June 1880: Euskirchen–Bonn
- 1 October 1890: Euskirchen–Bad Münstereifel

=== After 1945 ===
On 1 August 1945, traffic was restored on a temporarily repaired line from Aachen to Düren, Euskirchen and Bonn. In 1956 a new station building was built on the site. Deutsche Bundesbahn built it in a functional style, as was customary in the postwar period. The Euskirchen painter and graphic designer Konrad Schaefer designed the facade windows. The plaza was redesigned. Thus the remaining trees were removed and the former character of the park was gone for good. The former gardens were replaced in 1956 by a paved surface with islands for bus stops.

=== Since 1970 ===
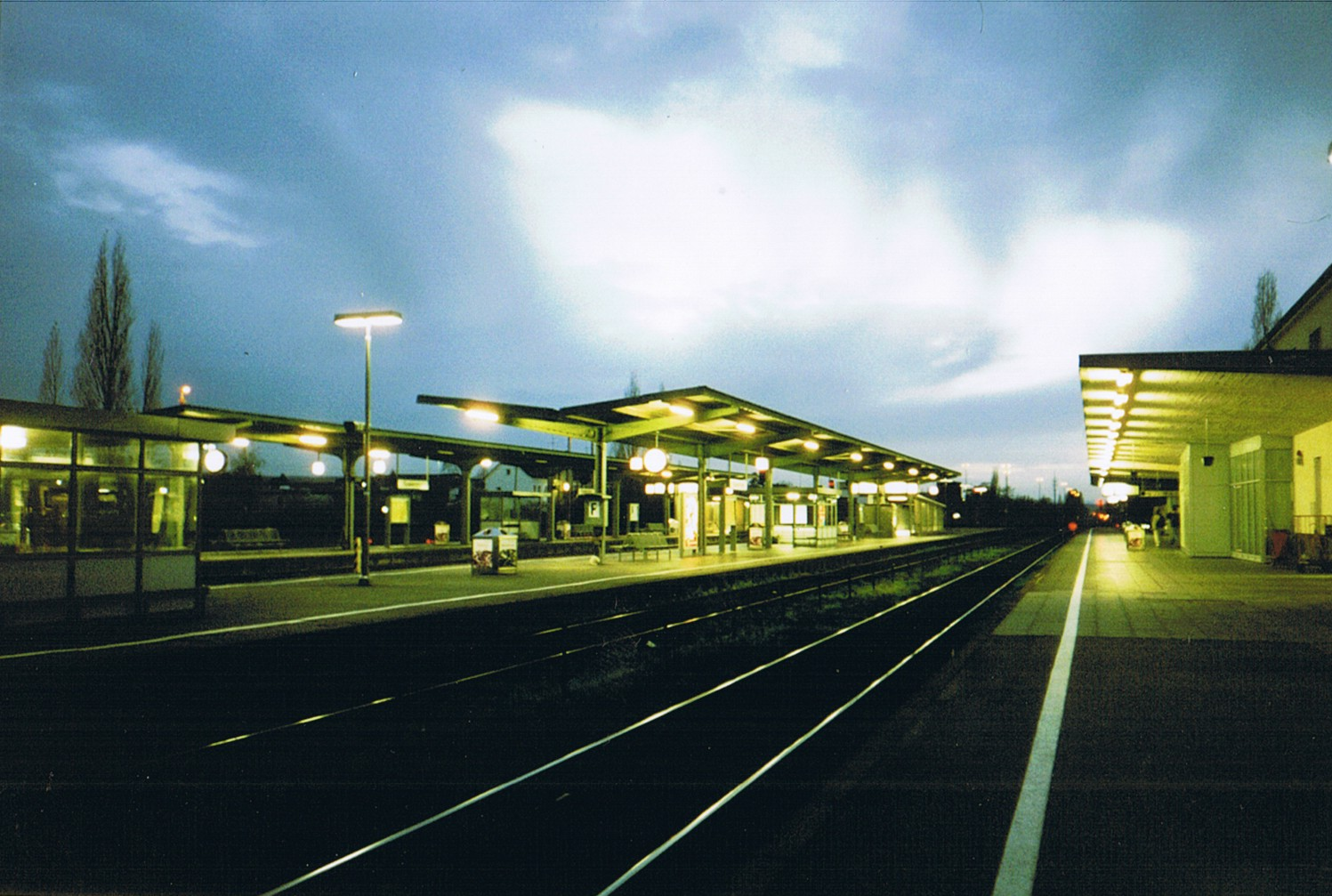
Station at night

Euskirchen station is a major railway junction, and its lines have had to cope with a high volume of commuter traffic with heavy overcrowding of trains. In order to handle traffic a new central railway station signal box was built for the equivalent of about €2.9 million. This was put into operation on 12 December 1973, after three years of planning and construction. Since the 90s, large central bus station, which was built by the city, has been located directly on the station forecourt. This has two fully covered walkways, which are served on both sides and a less protected platform for school buses. There is also an information point for travellers, electronic information displays, and an integrated taxi parking area. The station building houses lockers, vending machines, a ticket office, a bookstore, a bakery and a McDonald's restaurant.

=== 2008 to date ===
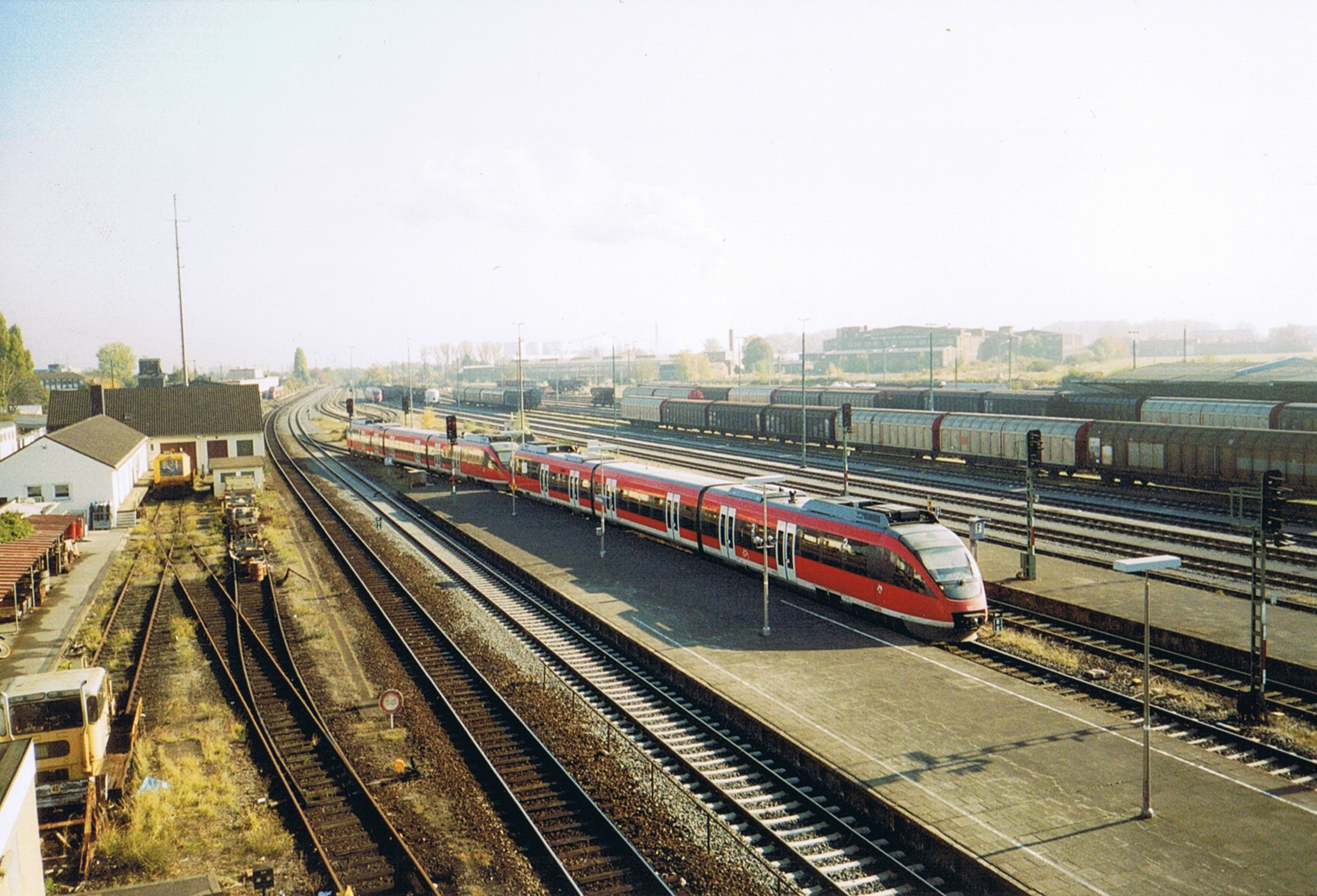
RB 23 Voreifelbahn service

Euskirchen station, apart from its forecourt, has not changed much structurally since the establishment of the new signal box at the station in 1973. The station building and platforms with their subway and canopies are now considered obsolete. Therefore, Deutsche Bahn announced in the spring of 2008 that it would modernise the station as part of a program for station modernisation throughout North Rhine-Westphalia. The station was upgraded and facilities for the disabled expanded. Parts of the western entrance building were demolished and a temporary bridge was erected at the eastern end of the platforms. The old underpass, the stairs up to the platforms and part of the roof were demolished completely and a new 70 m long and 6 m wide pedestrian underpass was built with three lifts and new staircases. The platforms were raised to a height of 76 cm to improve entrances and exits to trains. In addition, the pedestrian underpass and the platforms were equipped with tactile paving. The lighting, speakers, and information system were fundamentally renewed. This €8.3 million project was completed in mid November 2010.

== Platforms ==
Euskirchener station has 6 (7) platform tracks for passenger services:

- Track 1 for scheduled stopping trains from Cologne towards Kall, Gerolstein or Trier (rarely used by through freight trains)
- Track 2 for scheduled stopping train from Trier, Gerolstein or Kall towards Cologne
- Track 3 for scheduled stopping train from Bad Münstereifel towards Bonn
- Track 4 for scheduled stopping train from Cologne ending at Euskirchen and trains to and from Düren (Sundays only)
- Track 5 for scheduled stopping train from Bonn to Bad Münstereifel
- Track 46
- Track 47 occasionally for setting up trains to run on the Börde line (Euskirchen–Düren)

== Current operations ==
Local rail transport on the Eifel Railway (Eifelbahn) and the Voreifel Railway (Voreifelbahn) is operated by DB Regio NRW using Alstom Coradia LINT 54 and 81 DMUs.

=== Passenger services ===
Currently Euskirchen station is served by the following services:

| Line | Service | Route | Frequency |
|---|---|---|---|
| RE 12 | Eifel-Mosel-Express | Cologne – Euskirchen – Gerolstein – Trier | 3 train pairs |
| RE 22 | Eifel-Express | Cologne – Euskirchen – Gerolstein | 60 min |
| RB 23 | Erfttalbahn | Euskirchen - Bad Münstereifel | 60 min |
| RB 24 | Eifelbahn | Cologne – Euskirchen – Kall | 60 min |
| RB 28 | Bördebahn | Euskirchen - Zülpich - Vettweiß - Düren | 120 min (weekdays) 180 min (weekends and public holidays) |
| S23 | Voreifelbahn | Bonn - Rheinbach - Euskirchen | 15 (30/60) min |
