= Bad Münstereifel station =

Railway station in Bad Münstereifel, Germany

Bad Münstereifel
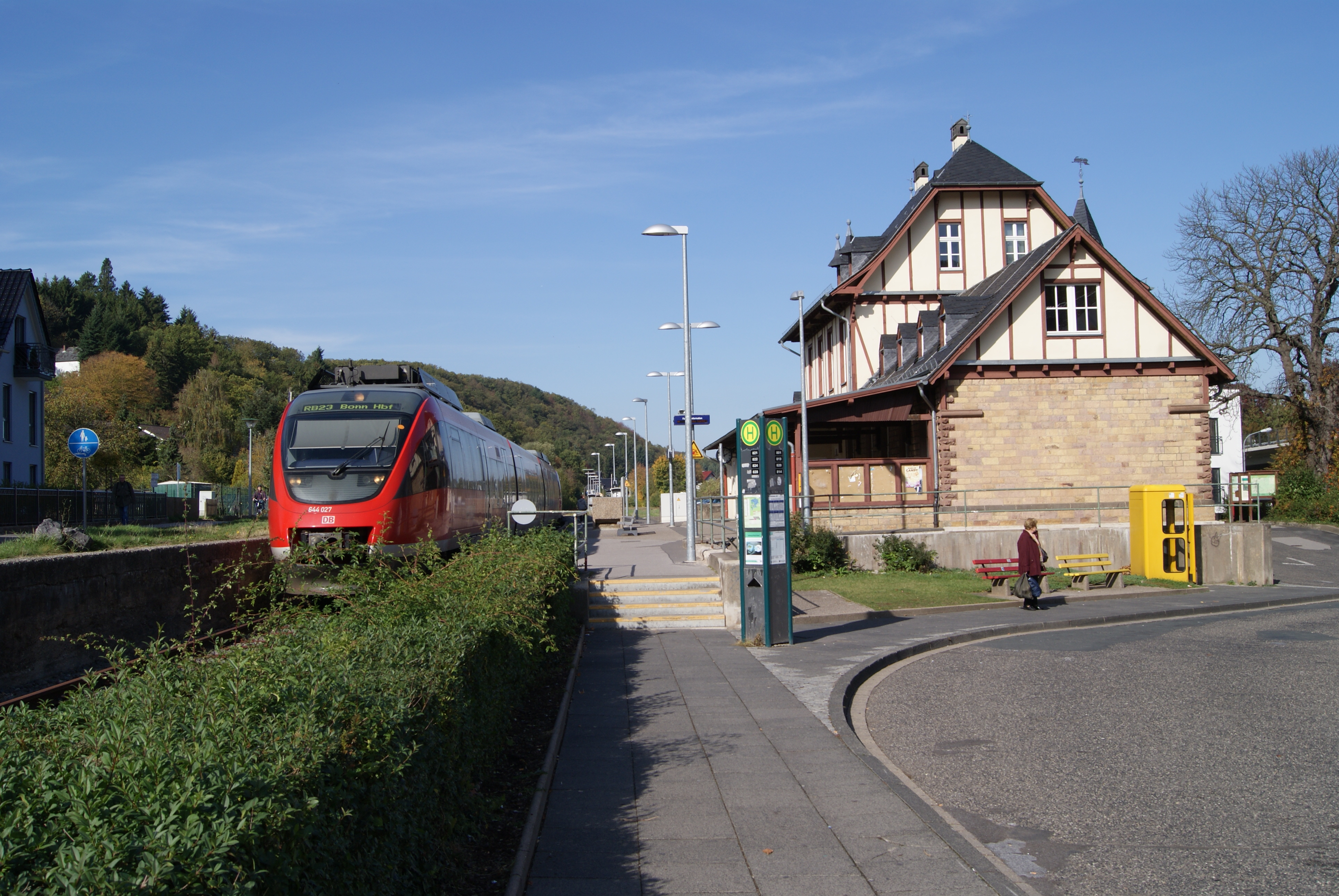

General information
- Location: Kölner Straße 13; 53902; Bad Münstereifel, North Rhine-Westphalia; Germany
- Coordinates: 50°33′32″N 6°45′52″E
- Owner: DB Netz
- Operator: DB Station&Service
- Line: Erft Valley Railway
- Distance: 13.8 km (8.6 mi) from Euskirchen
- Platforms: 1 side platform
- Tracks: 1
- Train operators: DB Regio NRW

Other information
- Station code: 308
- DS100 code: KMUE
- IBNR: 8000727
- Category: 6
- Fare zone: VRS: 2730
- Website: www.bahnhof.de

History
- Opened: 1890; 136 years ago

Services
Preceding station	DB Regio NRW	Following station
Terminus	RB 23	Bad Münstereifel-Iversheim towards Euskirchen
Location

Bad Münstereifel station is a railway station in the municipality of Bad Münstereifel, in the Euskirchen district in North Rhine-Westphalia, Germany.
