= Euskirchen =

Town in North Rhine-Westphalia, Germany

- Town
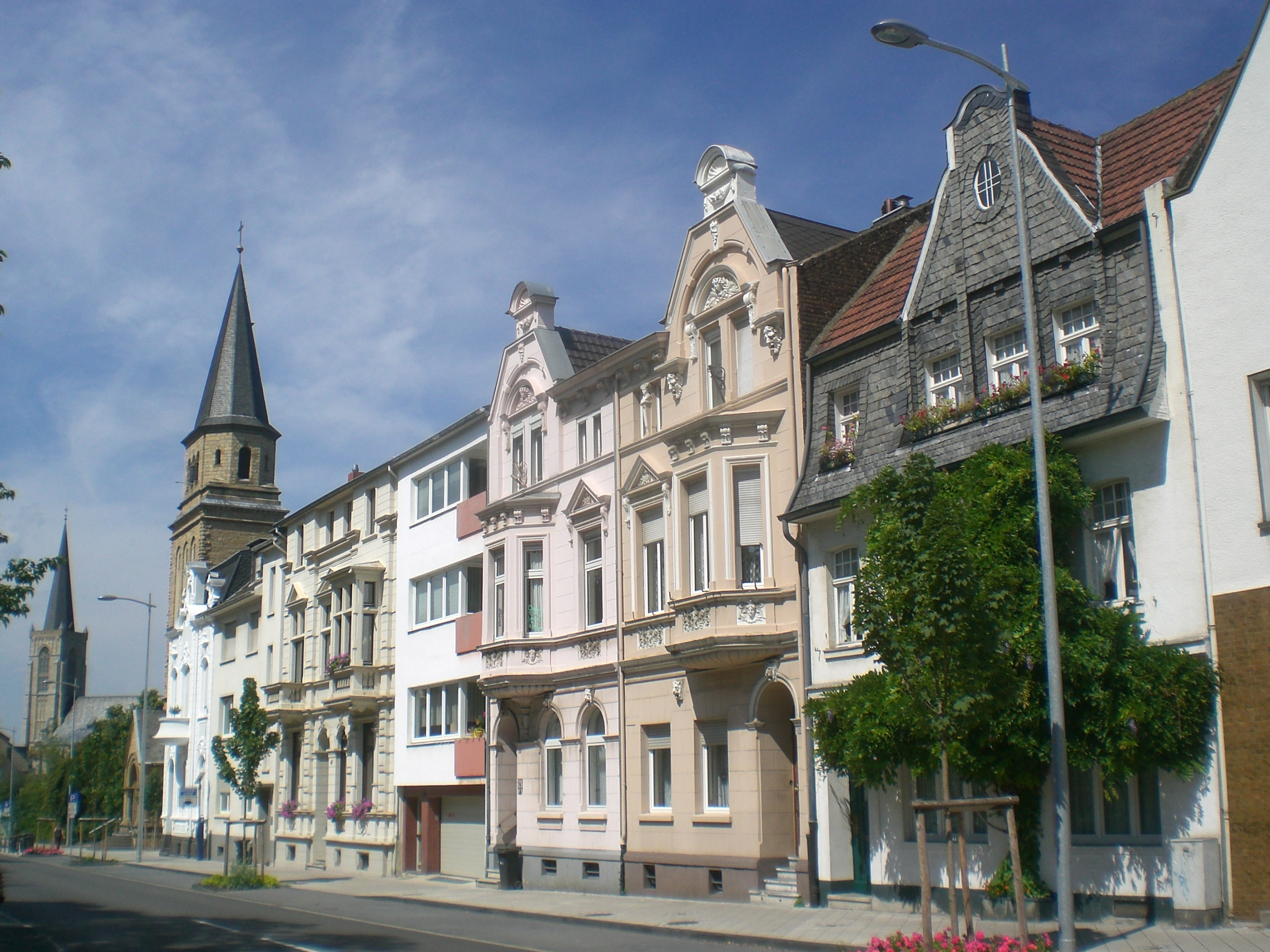

- Coat of arms

- Location of Euskirchen within Euskirchen district
- Interactive map of Euskirchen
- Location within Germany Location within North Rhine-Westphalia
- Coordinates: 50°39′35″N 6°47′30″E
- Country: Germany
- State: North Rhine-Westphalia
- Admin. region: Cologne
- District: Euskirchen

Government
  - Mayor (2020–25): Sacha Reichelt (SPD)

Area
  - Total: 139.63 km^{2} (53.91 sq mi)
- Elevation: 137 m (449 ft)

Population (2025-12-31)
  - Total: 59,977
  - Density: 429.54/km^{2} (1,112.5/sq mi)
- Time zone: UTC+01:00 (CET)
  - Summer (DST): UTC+02:00 (CEST)
- Postal codes: 53879–53881
- Dialling codes: 02251, 02255
- Vehicle registration: EU
- Website: www.euskirchen.de

Euskirchen (German pronunciation: [ˈɔʏskɪʁçn̩]; Ripuarian: Öskerche) is a town in North Rhine-Westphalia, Germany, capital of the district Euskirchen. While Euskirchen resembles a modern shopping town, it also has a history dating back over 700 years, having been granted town status in 1302. As of December 2025, it had a population of 59,977.

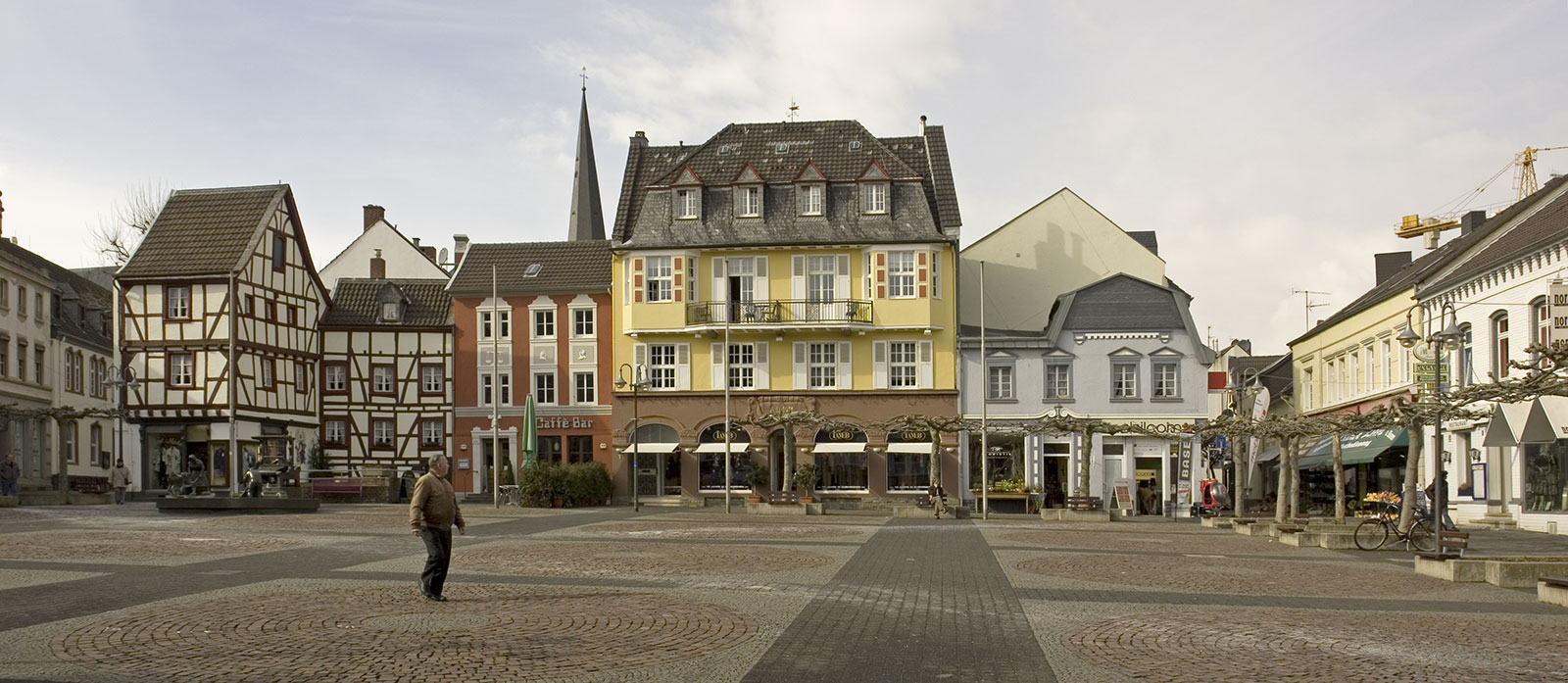
Euskirchen, old market (Alter Markt).

== Culture ==
Parts of the ancient town wall, and three of its defensive towers, are still standing. Tourists are also attracted to Euskirchen due to the proximity of two large cities, Cologne and Bonn, to the northeast, and the hills of the Eifel region to the south. It is also the birthplace of Emil Fischer, born 1852, who won the Nobel Prize in Chemistry in 1902. The local theatre in The Emil-Fischer-Gymnasium offers a wide variety of cultural events. The City Forum and the Parkhotel Euskirchen also contribute to the town's cultural offerings.

The word Euskirchen means Kirche auf der Aue ("church on riverside lowland"). The Martinskirche is the oldest church in Euskirchen.

Biggest local sports clubs in Euskirchen are the TSC Euskirchen, ESV Fortuna Euskirchen and LC Euskirchen. Sports facilities are the Heinz-Flohe-Stadion (until 2024 Erftstadion), gym Ohm-Mirgel-Halle, Jahnhalle, Willi-Maurer-Halle, gym Emil-Fischer-Gymnasium, Sportanlage Im Auel and gym Marienschule.

== Population ==
Historical population

Year	Pop.	±% p.a.
1965	39,425	—
1970	42,278	+1.41%
1975	43,562	+0.60%
1980	44,816	+0.57%
1985	45,311	+0.22%
1990	49,654	+1.85%
1995	52,205	+1.01%

Year	Pop.	±% p.a.
2000	53,680	+0.56%
2005	55,110	+0.53%
2010	55,620	+0.18%
2015	56,769	+0.41%
2020	58,466	+0.59%
2025	59,977	+0.51%

Source: Landesdatabank Nordrhein-Westfalen

== Industry and Commerce ==
Euskirchen has a diversified and balanced economic structure and can therefore provide jobs for a large catchment area. Euskirchen is a rural town with large, open fields serving agricultural purposes. Sugar beets are widely cultivated, and Euskirchen has been home to a sugar factory (Pfeifer & Langen) since 1879. Until a few decades ago, a further important branch of industry was cloth manufacturing, but this was unable to survive due to competition from large international corporations.

Well-known industrial enterprises (e.g. Procter & Gamble, Miele) are located within the town's industrial and commercial sites. These can also offer attractive possibilities to new enterprises. The town's central location and good road and rail links to the international transport network are important factors in this context.

The two largest industrial and commercial sites in Euskirchen, accounting for a total of 21,000 jobs between them, are:

- IPAS ("IndustriePark Am Silberberg") with four million m², of which 3.6 m² million lie within the boundary of the town of Euskirchen
- EURO-Park (located between Euskirchen and Roitzheim) with 1.5 million m².

At IPAS, in the districts Wüschheim/Großbüllesheim, the consumer goods corporation Procter & Gamble has a production plant as well as a warehouse from which it conducts its logistics operations all over the world. At EURO-Park the German company Nestlé Purina PetCare (pet food) and the "T-Versand" division of Deutsche Telekom have their headquarters, the sugar factory Pfeifer & Langen is based at EURO-Park and the building materials chain Mobau ("Moderner Baubedarf") – which has now merged into Eurobaustoff – was established.

Immediately adjacent to "Industriepark IPAS" is the "PrimeSite Rhine Region", an area reserved exclusively for major investors. With a total area of 205 hectares, which is equivalent to about 300 football fields, the "PrimeSite Rhine Region" is the first unbuilt and available industrial and commercial site of this size in North Rhine-Westphalia to date. Around 85 percent (177 hectares) of the site lies within the boundary of the town of Euskirchen, while about 15 percent (28 hectares) belong to the municipality of Weilerswist. The already well developed large area will be reserved up to 2019 for space-intensive large-scale projects in excess of 80 hectares. It is being marketed internationally by the state economic development agency NRW.INVEST.

== Twin towns – sister cities ==
Euskirchen is twinned with:

- Basingstoke, England, United Kingdom (1986)
- Charleville-Mézières, France (1964)

== Notable people ==
- Emil Fischer (1852–1919), chemist, 1902 Nobel Laureate in Chemistry for his work on sugar and purine syntheses

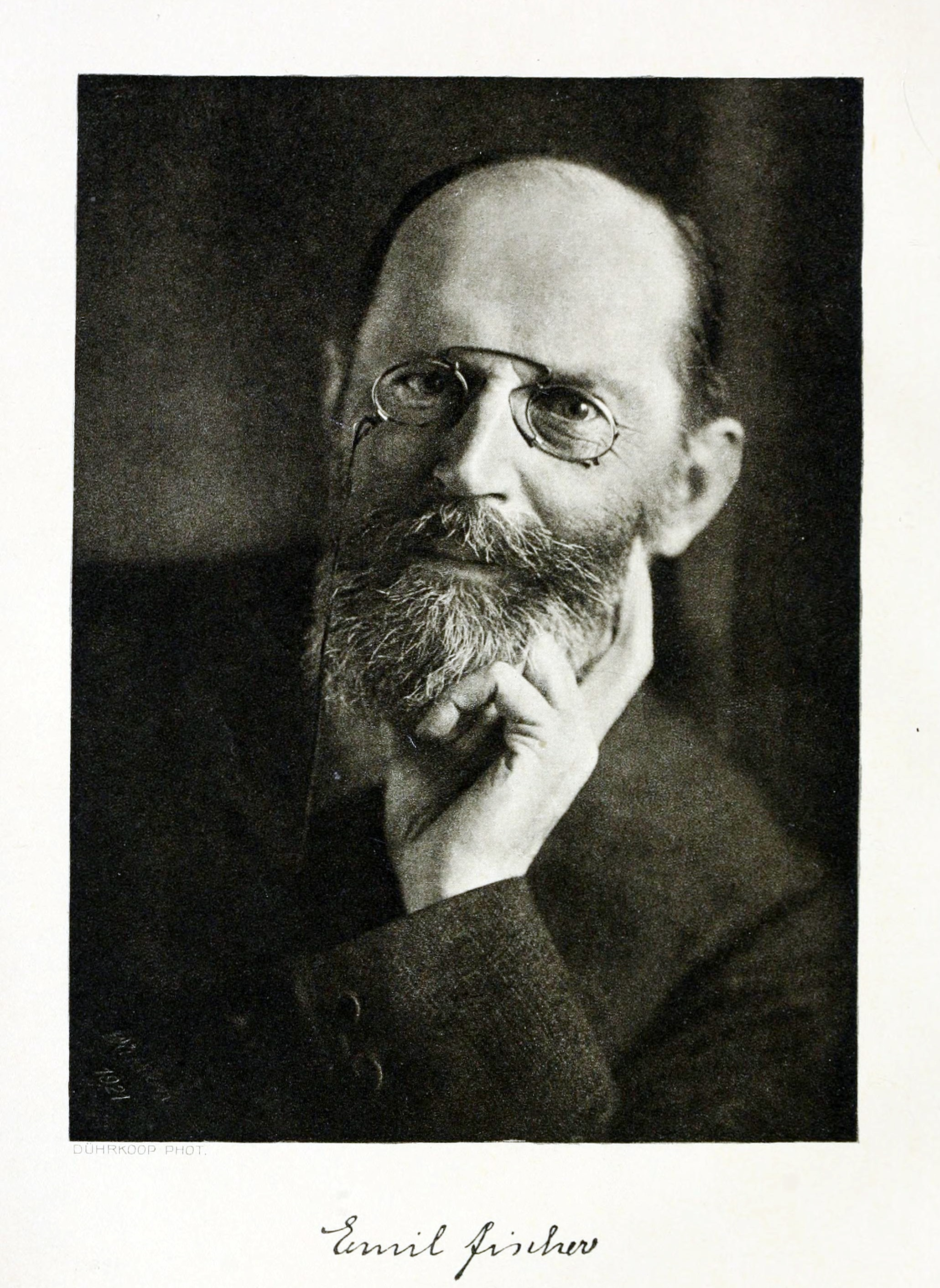
Emil Fischer around 1914

- Karl Eschweiler (1886–1936), a Catholic theologian and religious philosopher
- Willi Graf (1918–1943), member of the resistance group White Rose
- Heinz Flohe (1948–2013), former Germany national football team player (world champion 1974)
- Klaus Voussem (born 1970), politician
- Silke Rottenberg (born 1972), former Germany national football team player
- Bettina Wiegmann (born 1971), former Germany national football team player
- Sonja Fuss (born 1978), former Germany national football team player
- Sebastian Schlemmer (born 1978), actor
- Andreas Wolff (born 1991), handball goalkeeper
- Erdoğan Yeşilyurt (born 1993), professional footballer for Antalyaspor
- Lukas Klünter (born 1996), professional footballer for Waldhof Mannheim and the Germany National Football Team
- Tobias Müller (born 1997), racing driver
- Jonas Urbig (born 2003), professional footballer for Bayern Munich
- Melanie Dargel (born 2005), rhythmic gymnast who won medals at the World and European Championships
