= Günther Niethammer =

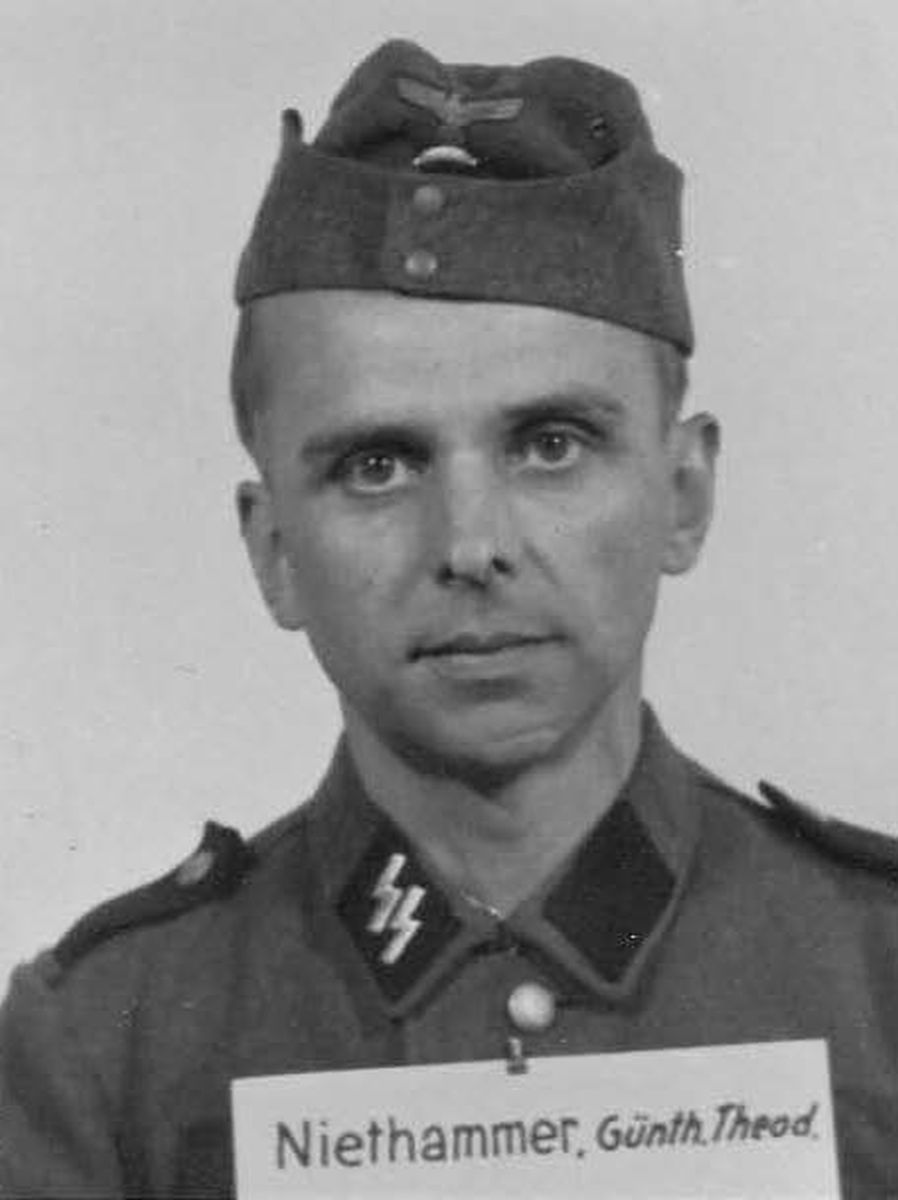
Niethammer at the end of the war

Günther Theodor Niethammer (28 September 1908 Waldheim – 14 January 1974, Kottenforst) was a German ornithologist who served during the Second World War with the Nazi Waffen-SS at various places including the Auschwitz concentration camp where he conducted studies on birds. He was the author of a three-volume work on the birds of Germany, Handbuch der Deutschen Vogelkunde.

== Life and work ==
Niethammer was born in Waldheim, the eighth son of Konrad Niethammer, a paper manufacturer (owner of Kübler & Niethammer paper mills) and politician. After studying zoology at the University of Tübingen in 1927 he moved to Leipzig in 1929 and then worked on the anatomy of the avian crop under J. Meisenheimer. Through Hans Kummerlöwe, also in Leipzig, he met Erwin Stresemann who gave him the task of compiling the Handbuch der Deutschen Vogelkunde. The publication of the first volume led to a position as a curator at the Museum Koenig in Bonn from 1937 and he continued to work on the remaining two volumes, the last published in 1942. In 1937, Niethammer joined the Nazi party (Number 5613683) and in early 1940 he volunteered with the Luftwaffe as he had a flying license. Due to his age, he was rejected and he then tried to join the Wehrmacht which also refused to admit him. He then joined the armed unit, Waffen-SS, in May 1940. He was posted to Oranienburg and shortly after to Auschwitz concentration camp where he was posted at gate G as a part of the security team. Opposite gate G was a gravel pit where prisoners were routinely killed. He made a request to the camp commander Rudolf Höss for alternate duty and towards March 1941 he was given "special ornithological duty" nearby and Niethammer published on the birdlife of the Auschwitz area. There were many fishponds around the area which had dykes that were made of ash from burned prisoners. Niethammer hunted ducks nearby which were shared with Höss and son Klaus. A prisoner named Jan Grębocki (born 1908) helped in the preparation of bird specimens. Grębocki (prisoner number 136) had been a forester and hunter and was treated better because of being Niethammer's assistant. He survived Auschwitz but after Niethammer's exit, he was sent to Neuengamme and likely drowned aboard a ship that was sunk by Allied aerial bombing off Lübeck on 3 May 1945.

Niethammer wrote a letter to the botanist Fritz von Wettstein (1895–1945) suggesting that botanical and ornithological research in new areas could be conducted. At the end of 1941 Wettstein wrote to Höss to release Niethammer for an expedition to Crete. In 1942, Wettstein, Niethammer, Hans Stubbe and two others collected specimens across Crete before returning to duty at Auschwitz. In October 1942 he was transferred to unit K led by Sturmbannführer Ernst Schäfer. Schäfer was planning an expedition to the Caucasus with Niethammer and Bruno Beger. This was not approved by Himmler and Niethammer appealed to Schäfer to extend his service to support the writing-up of the Crete surveys at the Natural History Museum in Bonn. Beger was instead sent to Auschwitz. In May 1944 Niethammer was transferred to the ‘Hygiene Institute’ in Berlin and appointed as a zoologist and promoted to Obersturmführer. He served in administrative roles under Bruno Weber (1915–1956) and Hans Münch (1911–2001). He was sent to Sofia to examine the bird collections that had been seized and examine other possibilities such as the capture of Pyrenean horses. In March 1944 Sofia was being bombed and much of Niethammer's work was to save the museum collections along with Pavel Patev. In early January 1945, Niethammer was sent to German-occupied Trieste to examine museum collections. From 22 April to 8 May 1945 he served in combat operations with the 269th Infantry Division. When the Allied Forces took over the region, he fled in civilian clothes on a bicycle belonging to Richard Heyder (1884–1984). In early February 1946 he reported to the British 320th Field Security Section in Bonn and was arrested. Niethammer was sentenced to eight years of imprisonment but it was reviewed and reduced to three years. He was placed in Mokotów Prison in Warsaw and released in November 1949.

Niethammer became head of the ornithology department at the Museum Koenig in 1950 and became a professor in 1951 and retired in 1973 to Bonn. From 1962 to 1972 he served as editor for the Journal für Ornithologie. He died of a heart failure while hunting on 14 January 1974. Niethammer's Nazi record was suppressed during his time in West Germany although known from his publications.

Arno Surminski based his 2008 novel Die Vogelwelt von Auschwitz upon Niethammer's ornithological studies around Auschwitz. Niethammer was married to Ruth née Filtzer and one of their four sons, Jochen became a mammalogist of repute. Several subspecies of birds have been named after him including:

- Carpodacus rubicilla niethammeri Keve, 1943
- Pogoniulus pusillus niethammeri Clancey, 1952
- Carduelis cannabina guentheri Wolters, 1952
- Calandrella rufescens niethammeri Kumerloeve, 1963
- Garrulus glandarius hansguentheri Keve, 1967 (after Hans Kumerloeve and Niethammer)
- Nothoprocta pentlandi niethammeri Koepcke, 1968
- Mirafra angolensis niethammeri Da Rosa Pinto, 1968
- Amandava subflava niethammeri Wolters, 1969

A genus of pyralid moth is named after him as Niethammeriodes.
