= Brühl (Rhineland) =

- Town
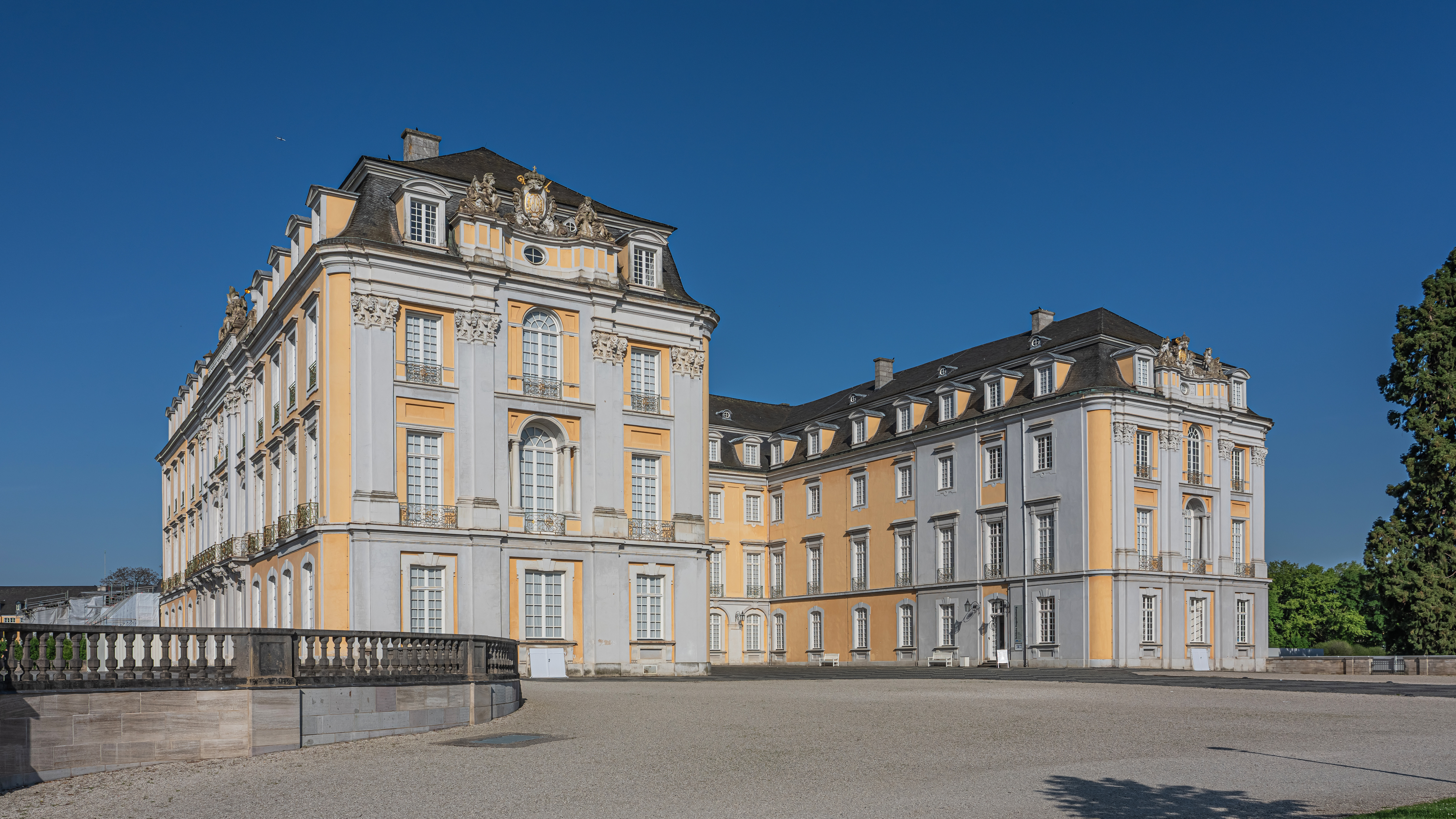
- Augustusburg Palace

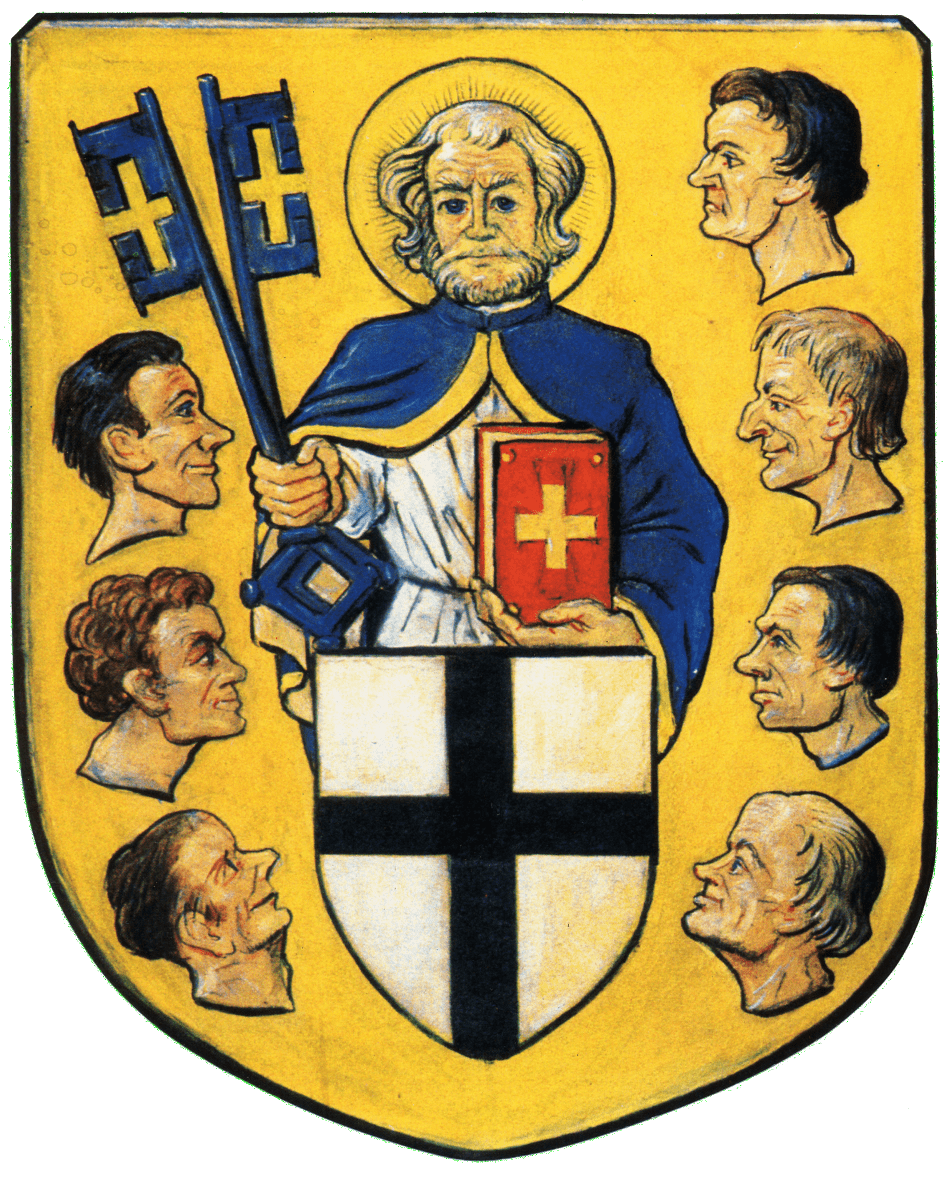
- Flag Coat of arms

- Location of Brühl within Rhein-Erft-Kreis district
- Interactive map of Brühl
- Location within Germany Location within North Rhine-Westphalia
- Coordinates: 50°50′N 6°54′E
- Country: Germany
- State: North Rhine-Westphalia
- Admin. region: Köln
- District: Rhein-Erft-Kreis
- Subdivisions: 7

Government
  - Mayor (2025–30): Marc Prokop (CDU)

Area
  - Total: 36.12 km^{2} (13.95 sq mi)
- Elevation: 65 m (213 ft)

Population (2025-12-31)
  - Total: 45,653
  - Density: 1,264/km^{2} (3,274/sq mi)
- Time zone: UTC+01:00 (CET)
  - Summer (DST): UTC+02:00 (CEST)
- Postal codes: 50321
- Dialling codes: 02232
- Vehicle registration: BM
- Website: bruehl.de

Brühl (pronounced [bʁyːl]) is a town in the Rhineland, Germany. It is located in the district of Rhine-Erft, 20 km south of the Cologne city center and at the edge of the Rhineland Nature Park, a famous nature reserve. With the palaces of Augustusburg and Falkenlust, both UNESCO World Heritage Sites, the moated castle of Schallenburg, the lake district within the Kottenforest, and the Phantasialand amusement park, it ranks among the most important tourist destinations in the Rhineland. With its numerous universities, museums, art galleries, local government offices, and manufacturing companies, the former electoral residence is also an important regional hub between Cologne and Bonn.

== History ==
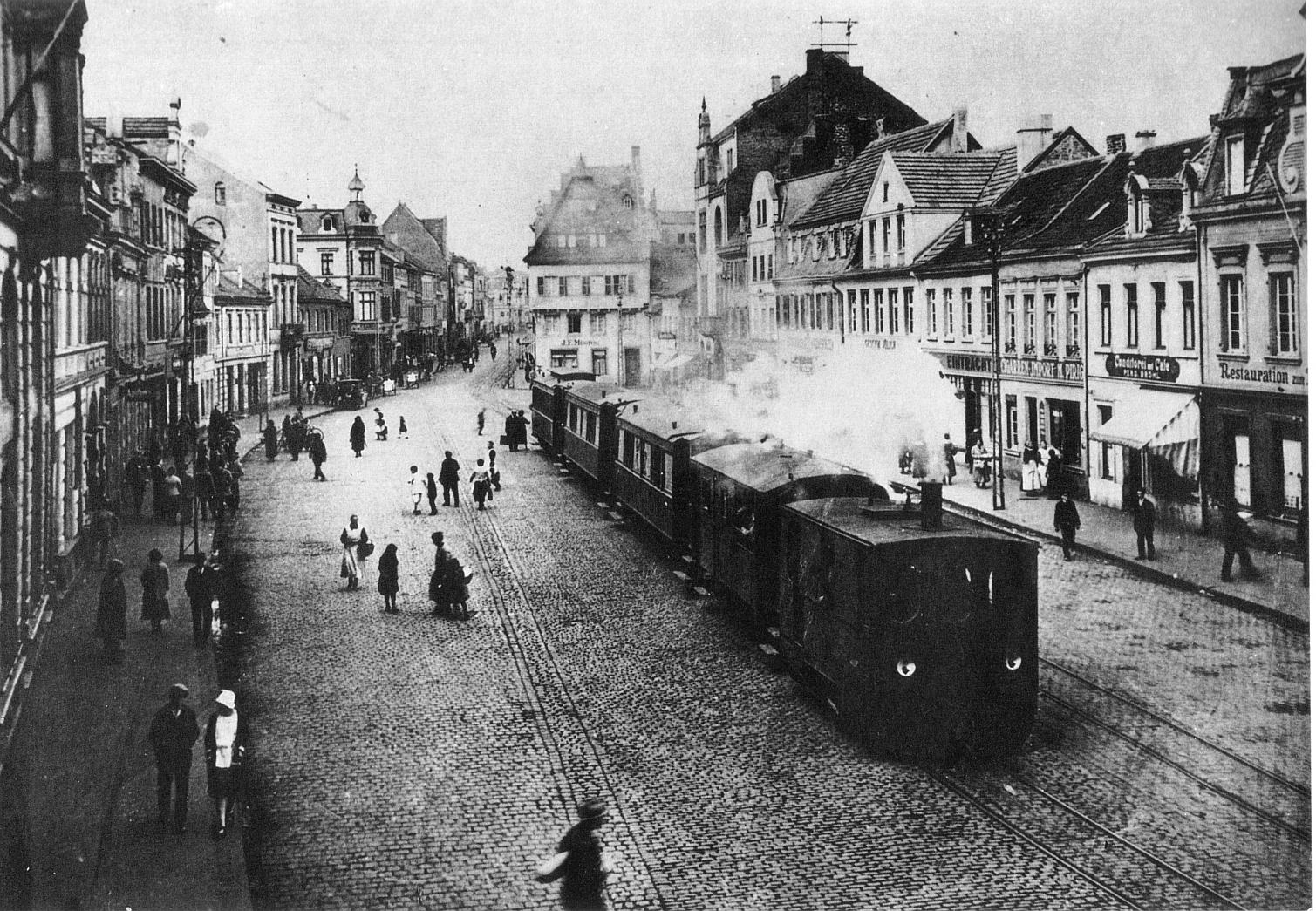
Brühl market place, c. 1900

Brühl received its town privileges in 1285. At the end of the 12th century or the beginning of the 13th, the Jewish scholar Rav Shlomo, grandson of the known Samuel Ben Natronai lived in the city. From 1567 on, the city of Brühl was the official residence of the Prince Bishops of Cologne. In the 18th century the Prince Bishop Clemens August replaced a former ruined castle and built the Augustusburg and Falkenlust palaces near the city center. Today, both are listed as UNESCO World Heritage Sites because of their outstanding rococo architecture. Until 1990 Augustusburg Palace was used by the federal government to receive foreign heads of states visiting West Germany.

== Population ==
Historical population

Year	Pop.	±% p.a.
1965	40,162	—
1970	42,692	+1.23%
1975	44,302	+0.74%
1980	42,893	−0.64%
1985	40,724	−1.03%
1990	41,829	+0.54%
1995	43,653	+0.86%

Year	Pop.	±% p.a.
2000	43,839	+0.09%
2005	44,349	+0.23%
2010	44,260	−0.04%
2015	44,768	+0.23%
2020	43,673	−0.49%
2025	45,653	+0.89%

Source: Landesdatabank Nordrhein-Westfalen

== Main sights ==
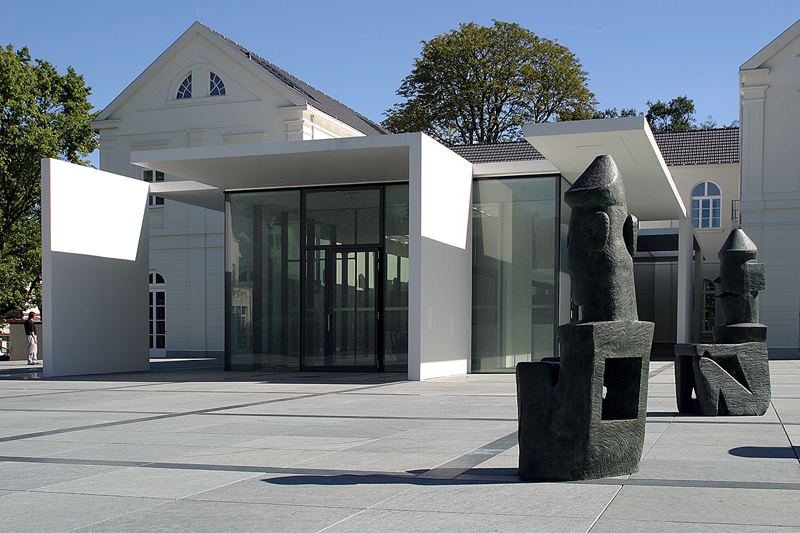
The Max Ernst Museum of modern art

- The amusement park Phantasialand
- The Max Ernst Museum, opened in 2005. It displays sculptures and paintings of the surrealistic artist Max Ernst (who was born in Brühl) and other modern art.
- Local history and pottery are shown in two small museums in the city centre

== Infrastructure ==
Brühl station is on the Left Rhine line and the nearby Kierberg station is on the Eifel railway. Brühl also has several stops on line 18 of the Cologne tram line.

== Notable people ==
- Else Schmitt (1921–1995), politician (SPD) and a district mayor in Cologne
- Erika Reihlen (born 1936), theologian and former president of the German Protestant Church Day
- Hans Leyendecker (born 1949), journalist
- Heinz-Josef Kehr (1950–2014), footballer
- Helmut Müller-Brühl (1933–2012), conductor and initiator of the Brühler Schlosskonzerte at the Augustusburg Palace
- Joel Sturm (born 2001), racing driver
- Josef Engel (1922–1978), historian
- Max Ernst (1891–1976), painter and sculptor
- Patric Hemgesberg (born 1973), lyricist
- Reiner Calmund (born 1948), football coach and former manager of Bayer 04 Leverkusen
- Wolfgang Streeck (born 1946), sociologist

== Twin towns – sister cities ==
Brühl is twinned with:

- Chalcis, Greece
- Kaş, Turkey
- Kunice, Poland
- Royal Leamington Spa, England, United Kingdom
- Sceaux, France
- Weißwasser, Germany

In addition to its twin towns, Brühl also cooperates with Battir, Palestine, and Marhanets, Ukraine.

== Gallery ==
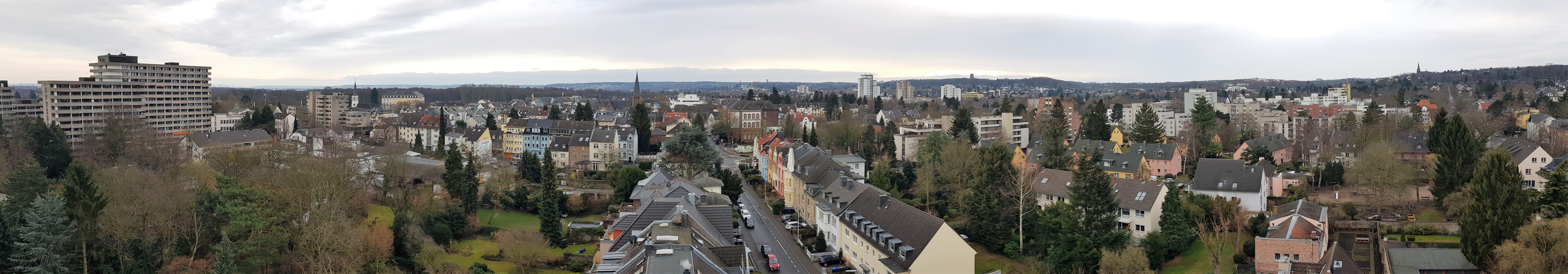
Panoramic view of Brühl as seen from the 1959-built Stelzenhaus skyscraper
