= Bearded reedling =

- Adult male P. b. biarmicus in Federsee, Germany
- Adult female P. b. biarmicus in Leighton Moss, England

Conservation status
- Least Concern (IUCN 3.1)

Scientific classification
- Kingdom: Animalia
- Phylum: Chordata
- Class: Aves
- Order: Passeriformes
- Parvorder: Sylviida
- Family: Panuridae; Des Murs, 1860
- Genus: Panurus; Koch, 1816
- Species: P. biarmicus

Binomial name
- Panurus biarmicus (Linnaeus, 1758)
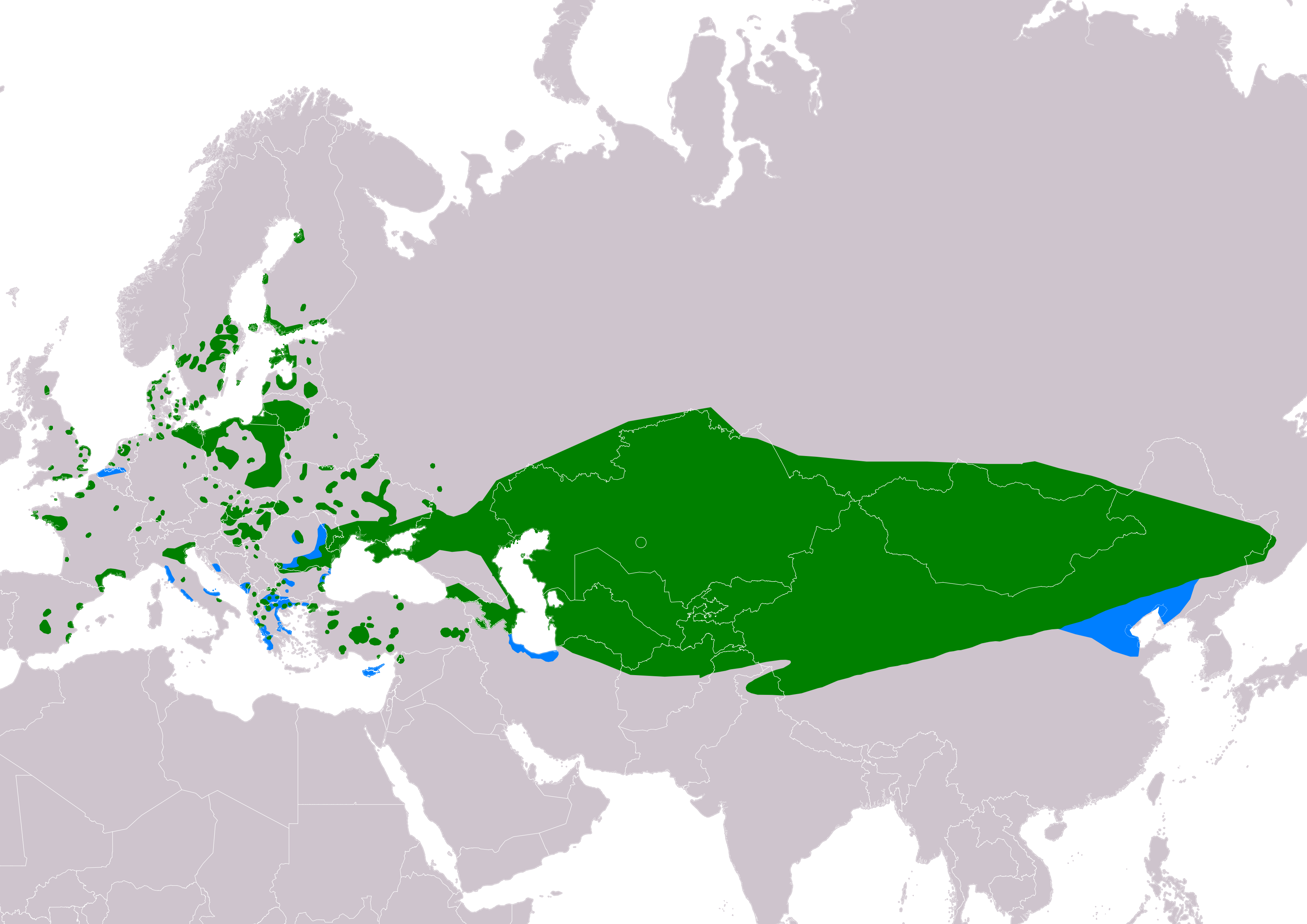
- Range of the bearded reedling (shown as continuous rather than patchy distribution in Asia due to less detailed mapping data) Resident Non-breeding visitor

Synonyms
- Parus biarmicus Linnaeus, 1758 (protonym)

Audio
- Birds recorded in Norfolk, England

Species of bird

The bearded reedling (Panurus biarmicus) is a small, long-tailed passerine bird found in reed beds near water in the temperate zone of Eurasia. It is frequently known as the bearded tit or occasionally as bearded parrotbill, as historically it was believed to be closely related to either the tits or parrotbills. Today it is known to lack close relatives and it is the only species in the family Panuridae.

Bearded reedlings are strongly sexually dimorphic and form life-long pairs. They are highly productive and can breed several times in a season. They mainly feed on small invertebrates in summer and reed (Phragmites australis) seeds in winter.

== Taxonomy and systematics ==
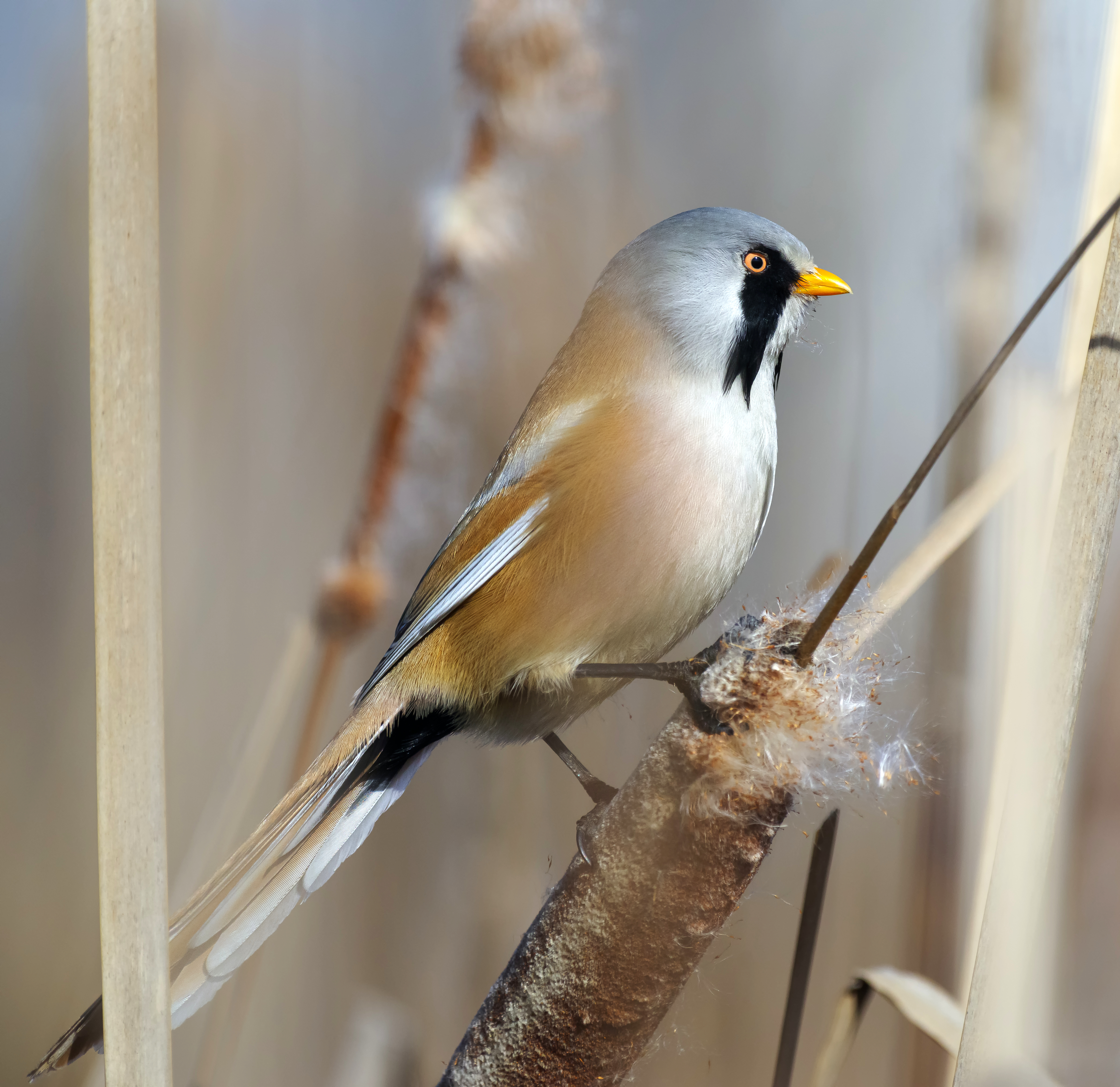
Adult male of the pale subspecies P. b. russicus in Kyiv, Ukraine

The bearded reedling was scientifically described in 1758 by the Swedish naturalist Carl Linnaeus in his 10th edition of Systema Naturae. He placed it with the tits in the genus Parus and coined the binomial name Parus biarmicus. Linnaeus based his entry on the "beardmanica or bearded tit-mouse" that had been described and illustrated in 1731 by the English naturalist Eleazar Albin and the "least butcher-bird" that had been described and illustrated in 1747 by George Edwards.

The bearded reedling was later moved from the tit family and placed with the parrotbills in the family Paradoxornithidae. Subsequent authors variously classified the species as a member of Muscicapidae (Old World flycatchers), Sylviidae (typical warblers), or Timaliidae (Old World babblers). Molecular phylogenetic studies show that it is a unique passerine, not part of any of these families. The bearded reedling is now placed in the monotypic family Panuridae that was described in 1860 (as the subfamily Panurinae) by Marc Athanase Parfait Œillet des Murs. It lacks close relatives, but it is a sylvioid and nearest to the lark family Alaudidae. Panuridae and Alaudidae split from each other in the Early Miocene.

The current genus name, Panurus, was introduced by Carl Ludwig Koch in 1816. It is from Ancient Greek panu, "exceedingly", and ουρά, "tail". The specific biarmicus is from "Biarmia", a Latinised form of Bjarmaland, today part of Russia's Arkhangelsk Oblast and Kola Peninsula (a result of confusion when the species was first described; the bearded reedling does not range into these areas).

=== Subspecies ===
Three subspecies are generally recognised:

- P. b. biarmicus (Linnaeus, 1758) – medium-dark in colour and found in northern, western and southern Europe, also ranging into Turkey and Azerbaijan.
- P. b. russicus (Brehm, CL, 1831) – pale and found in eastern Europe, through southern Russia and Central Asia to Mongolia and northern China.
- P. b. kosswigi Kumerloeve, 1959 – dark; restricted to Amik Gölü in Hatay Province of southern Turkey; probably extinct.

In some parts of central and eastern Europe, it is not entirely certain if P. b. biarmicus, P. b. russicus or intermediates are present. The three subspecies are quite similar; some authorities have suggested that the species should be considered monotypic (i.e. no distinct subspecies) because of the amount of individual variation and overall cline in the variation.

== Distribution and habitat ==
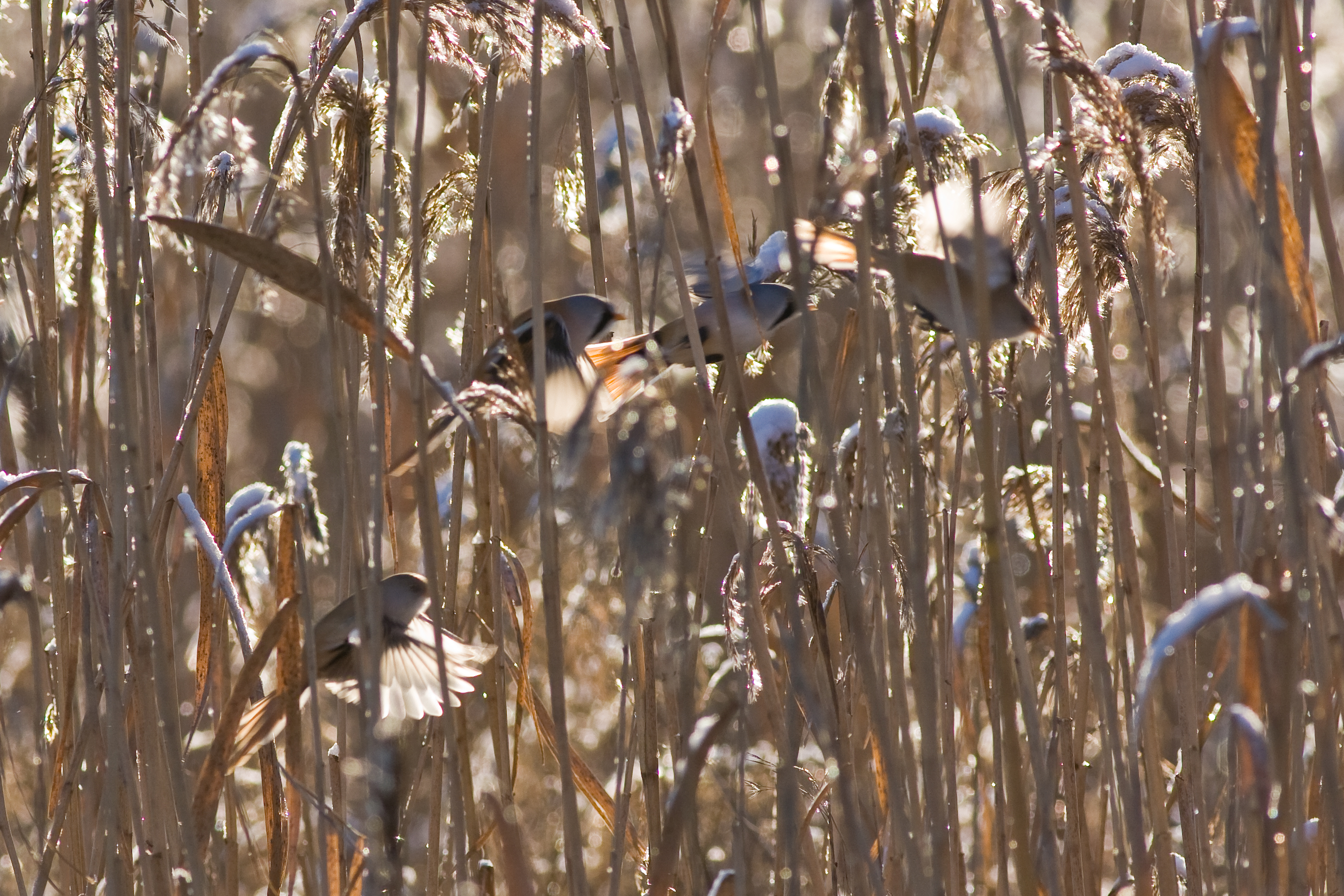
Flock in the species' typical reed bed habitat during winter in Finland, the northernmost part of its distribution

Juvenile male perched and moving around in reed beds in the Netherlands

The bearded reedling is native to temperate Europe and Asia, ranging from Spain, France and the British Isles to the Manchurian region, but its distribution tends to be quite spotty because of its habitat preference. Maps often show most of its Asian range as a single large continuous section (instead of more spotty), but this is due to limited details in monitoring data from this area relative to the western part of its range. In Europe, it used to be limited to mid and low latitudes, also including Great Britain, but in the second half of the 20th century it has expanded north into Scandinavia, Finland and the northern Baltics.

It is an occasional non-breeding visitor to Cyprus and Iran, and it has rarely been recorded as a vagrant to the west, south and east of its normal distribution in Portugal, North Africa, Israel, Kuwait, Pakistan, Japan and Korea. The species generally is resident and no population is known to follow a clear and consistent migration pattern. However, some European populations tend to spend the non-breeding period (winter) to the south or southwest of their breeding (summer) range, making what potentially can be described as a short-distance migration, up to a few hundred kilometres long. This is primarily seen in the northern half of the continent, but in no region does it appear to involve the entire population, with some birds partaking in such movements and some essentially staying year-round. Both adults and young may make eruptive dispersals outside the breeding season and in periods with limited food or cold weather bearded reedlings may perform other, most often local movements.

The bearded reedling is a habitat specialist found in reed beds, primarily those with common reed, by fresh or brackish water lakes, swamps or rivers, but it also occurs in nearby tall grass-like vegetation such as bulrushes and true sedges. Especially during the breeding period the species quite strongly avoids non-floodable or dry parts of wetlands, but in other times it may wander more freely. Although typically found perched or climbing on reeds and similar types of vegetation, it readily hops on the ground, especially in swampy places or at water's edge. It has a wide altitudinal range, mostly being found from sea level to medium altitudes, but has been recorded up to 3,050 m (10,010 ft) above sea level in China.

== Appearance and voice ==
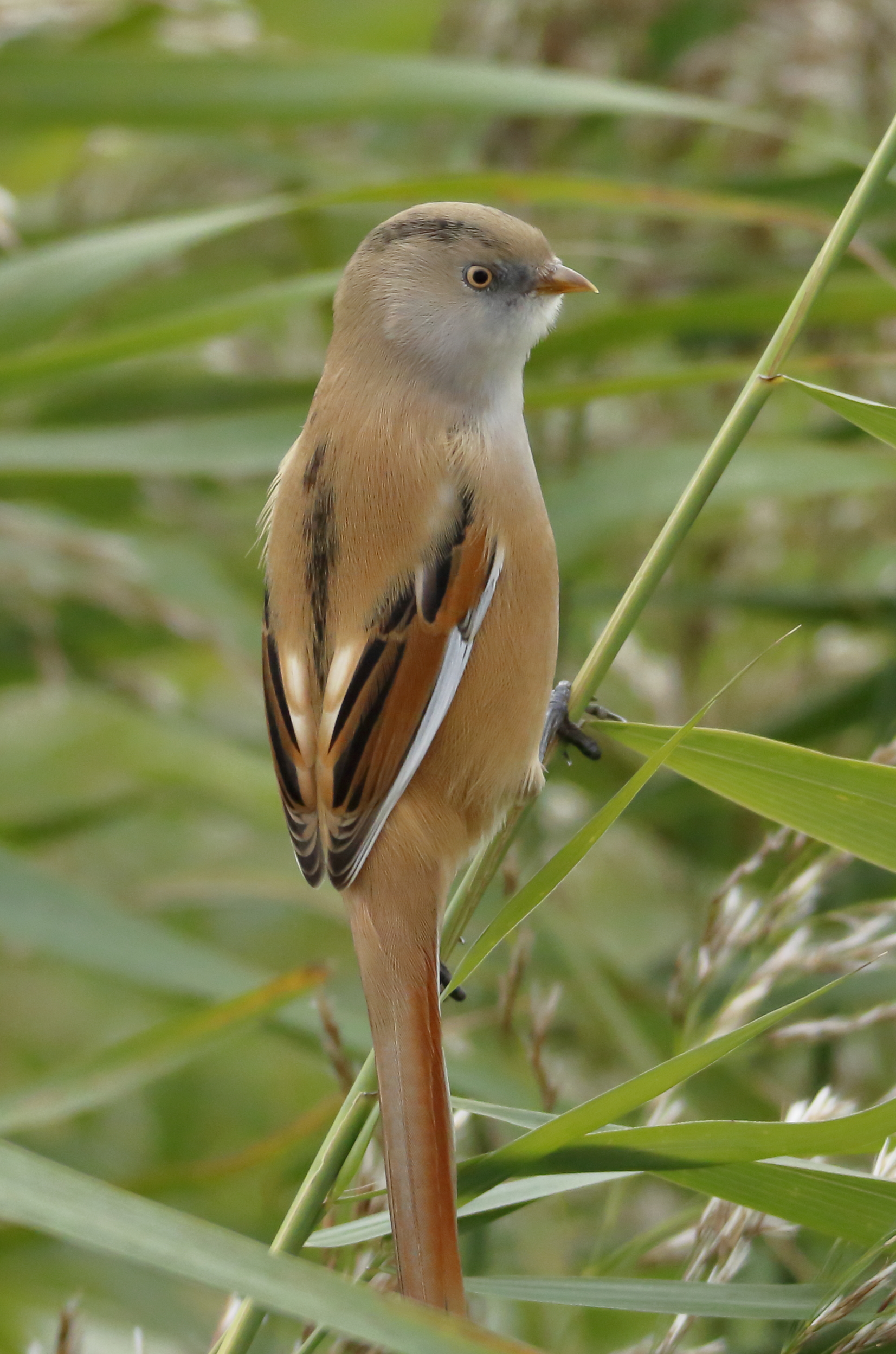
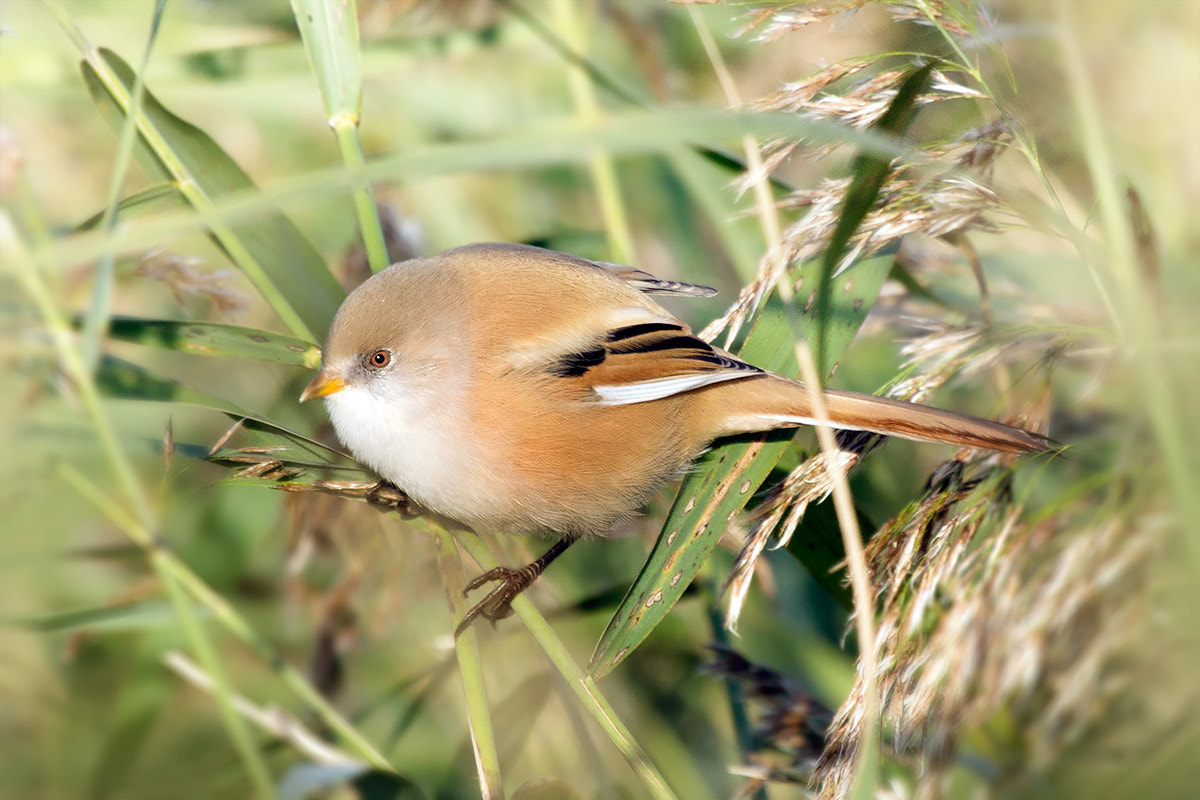
Adult females can have black streaks/spots to the back and crown (left) or a plain back and crown (right)
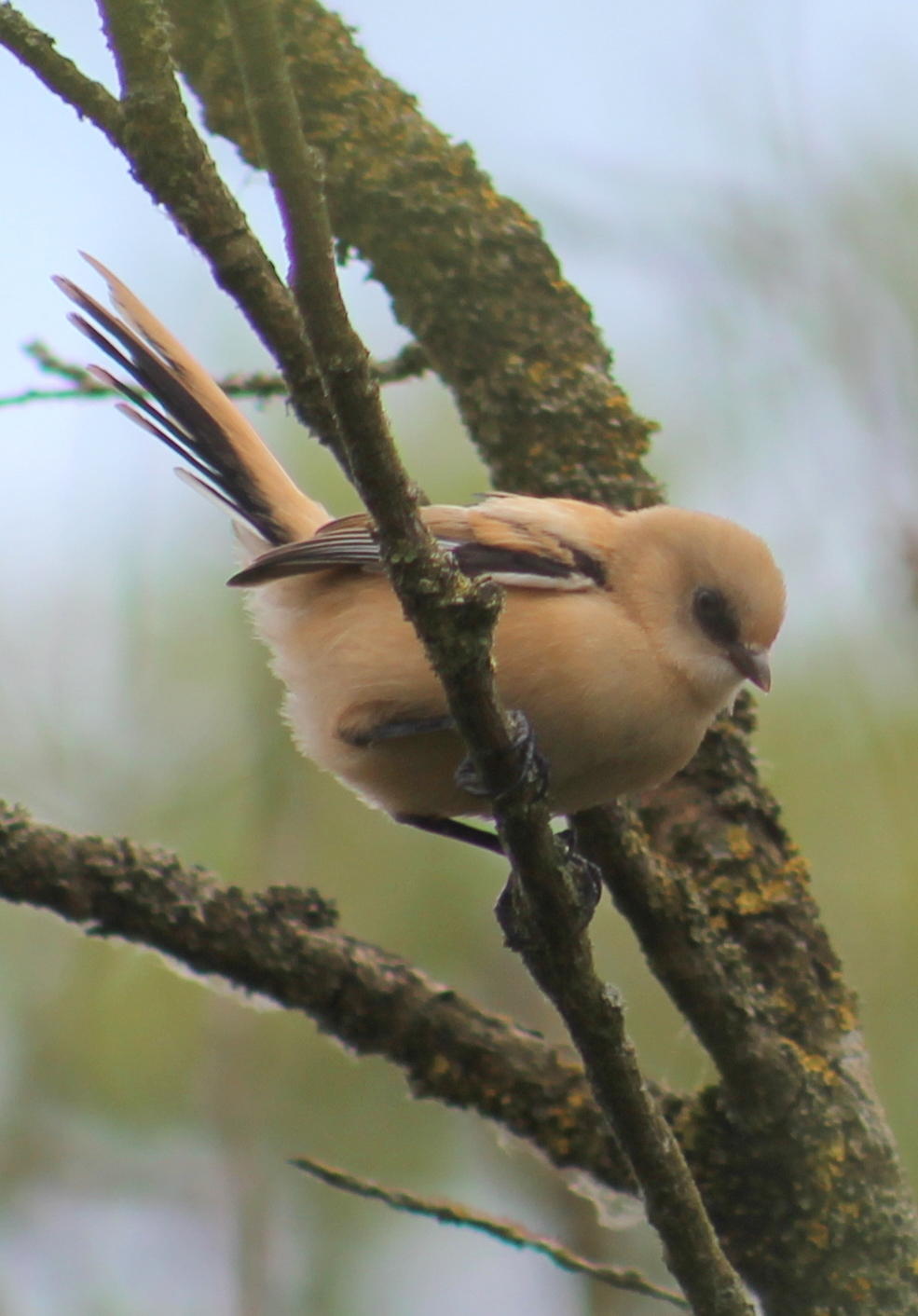
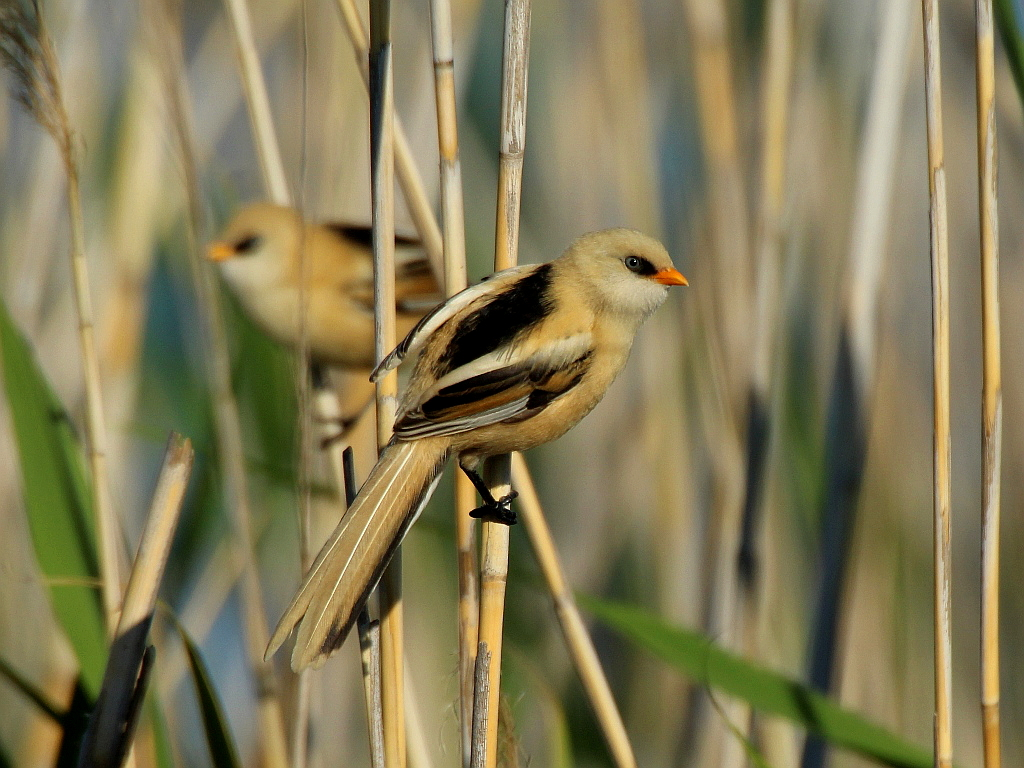
Juveniles of females (left) and males (right) resemble each other but have different bill and lore colours

This is a small bird, 14.5–17 cm (5.7–6.7 in) in length, with a long tail and an undulating flight. The plumage is mostly orange-brown, with a whitish throat and chest, some contrasting black and white parts in the wings, and white edges to the tail feathers. The adult male has a grey head, black "moustaches" (not a beard) and black undertail coverts. The adult female is generally paler, with a more brownish head and no black moustaches or undertail coverts, but sometimes with black streaks/spots to the crown or back. Whereas these streaks/spots vary from absent to strong in the west of the species' range, they are absent to faint in the east.

There is a single reported case of a gynandromorph bearded reedling where one side of the bird showed mainly male plumage characteristics and the other side female characteristics. The adult female's bill is often somewhat duller that the adult male's bright orange-yellow bill. Adults go through a single complete moult in the late summer–autumn, generally starting in August (just after the breeding season) and being finished around 50 days later.

Juveniles of both sexes resemble the adult female, but are overall buffier in colour, have a roughly rectangular black patch on the back (well beyond the streaks/spots on the backs of even the most strongly marked adult females) and extensive black to the tail feathers. The juvenile male has a relatively large and contrasting black loreal patch and a bright orange-yellow bill, whereas the juvenile female has a smaller dusky-grey loreal patch and a blackish, brownish or yellowish-dusky bill. This sex-related difference in juvenile bill colour is already evident at the late nestling stage. Unlike most birds, bearded reedlings undergo a complete post-juvenile moult, starting in late July–early September and ending with an adult plumage in October. This means that bearded reedlings hatched only a few months earlier already are indistinguishable from older adults by the autumn. When first fledged, juveniles have dark brown eyes, which then become grey and later grey-yellow or yellow. Once they have moulted into the adult plumage they also generally have the adult yellow or orange eye colour; however bearded reedlings in adult plumage with juvenile-like brown or grey eyes occur on occasion.

Because of their well-camouflaged plumage and dense reed bed habitat, they are easily overlooked, but their presence is often revealed by their characteristic metallic "ping" call, which is used by bearded reedlings to maintain contact with each other. The male's song has been described as a tuneful "tschin-schik-schra". During flight, their short wings give a whirring sound.

== Behaviour ==
=== Life cycle ===
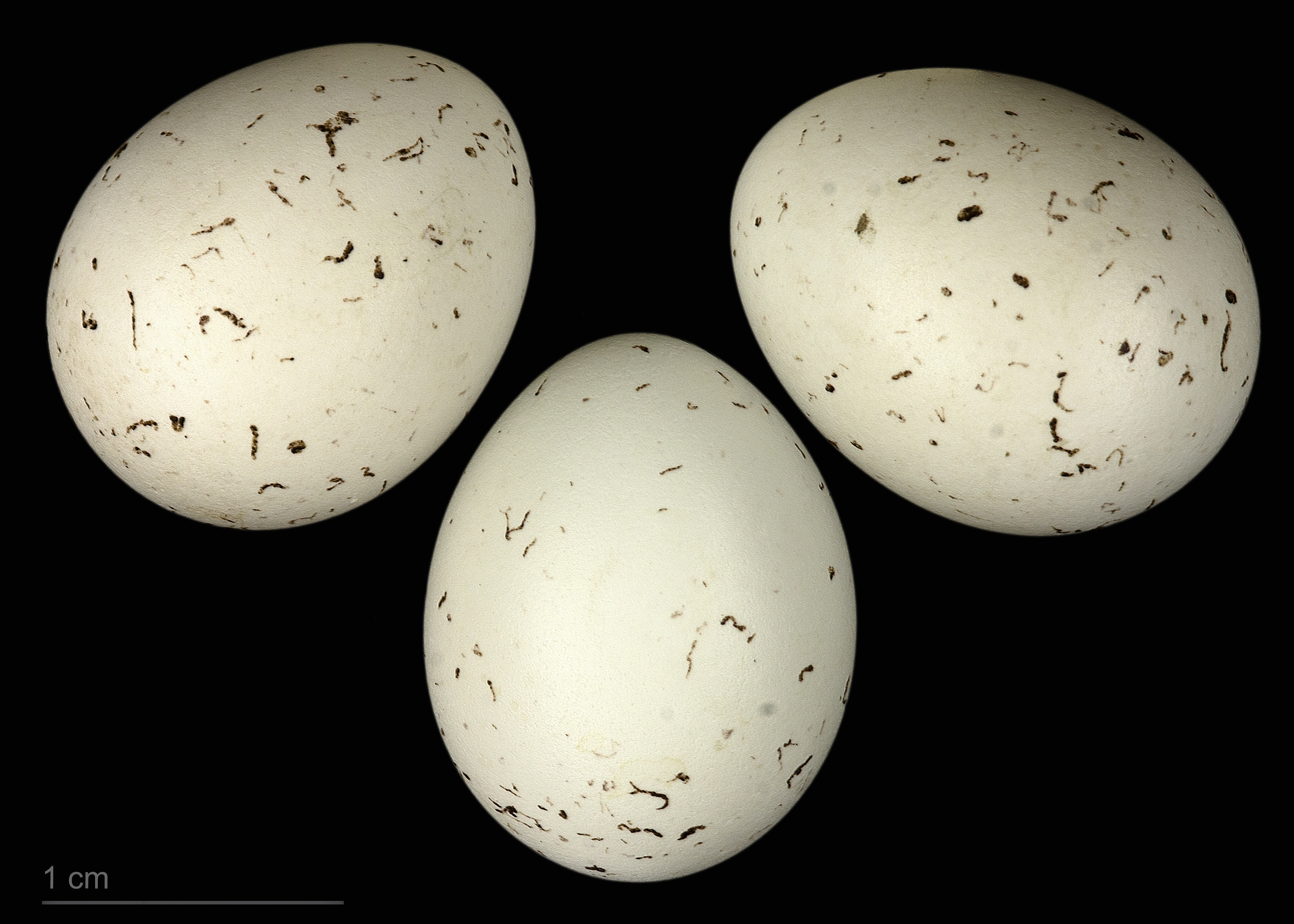
Eggs at Muséum de Toulouse, France

The bearded reedling is social and during the non-breeding season it is usually seen in groups of up to a few tens of birds, exceptionally up to two hundred. During the breeding season, it is most commonly seen in pairs, family groups or groups of independent young.

Young birds already form pairs when still juvenile, only a few weeks after having fledged. Once formed, a pairing is generally life-long and they stay together throughout the year, also sleeping closely together. If one part of a pair dies, the surviving bird may join groups of young to find a new partner to pair up with. A pair is monogamous, although mating with another partner (infidelity) is not uncommon for either sex. The length of a male's black "moustaches" is an honest signal indicating his dominance (in competitions for food between males the one with the longest "moustaches" usually wins) and females prefer males where it is longer. Both sexes, but especially females, also prefer partners with longer tails and tail length plays a role in a bird's movement agility. In juveniles of both sexes, the size of the loreal patch is an honest signal of body condition, but whether this plays a role in mate choice when pairs are first established is unknown.

Breeding happens in the spring and summer, from late March to early September, but how early it starts and late it ends depends on environmental conditions and availability of food, and April to July is common. There are typically two or three, less frequently four and rarely five, broods in a season. In captivity where not limited by the same conditions as in the wild, they may already begin to breed in late February and exceptionally there can be attempts of up to seven broods in a season, although it is doubtful that this many can be raised successfully. A pair may nest alone or as part of a small loose colony that on average consists of six pairs with nests located a few metres apart.

Infidelity is common in those nesting in loose colonies and rare in pairs nesting alone. It frequently happens when a female performs a "catch-me-if-you-can" behaviour, initiated by her making a specific call that attracts males, then flies up with males in pursuit, finally diving down to the reed bed and allowing the fastest male to mate with her. The winner can be her own male partner or a male paired with another female, but unpaired males are generally unlikely to mate at all. Mating is very frequent and to increase the chance of fathering a clutch the male bearded reedling has a relatively large and muscular cloacal protuberance that functions as a copulatory organ, which is unique among passerines. In the wild bearded reedlings are entirely non-territorial, but those living under the more restricted space of captivity may show some territorial tendencies, though two pairs can still inhabit and breed in an aviary that covers a couple of square metres.

Both sexes participate in the building of the cup-shaped nest, which has a diameter of between 7.5 and 17 cm (3.0–6.7 in). It is attached to reeds or similar vegetation and can be positioned from almost ground or water level to a height of about 0.7 m (2 ft 4 in). Artificial nests are also accepted. Both sexes participate in the up to two week long incubation of the 3 to 11 (usually 4 to 8) eggs, which is followed by another up to about two week long nestling period. After having left the nest, which frequently happens before being able to fly, the young continue to rely on the parents for up to about a two weeks, rarely more. With a typical nest building period of five days, the average time from start of building a nest to young being fully independent is about forty days. Especially in years with a low population density, a pair may start a new brood in a nearby new nest even before their previous has left their nest. When there are overlapping broods, the female devotes her time to the new brood and the male divides his time between the old and the new. During successful years, a pair is likely to have the highest number of young in a season of any European passerine. Young reach sexual maturity rapidly, and those hatched early in a season can potentially breed late in the same season, but this is exceptional (it has not been confirmed from bearded reedlings in the wild) and first breeding usually only happens the following year.

On average, bearded reedlings reach an age of two or three years, but the record is seven years and three months.

=== Feeding ===
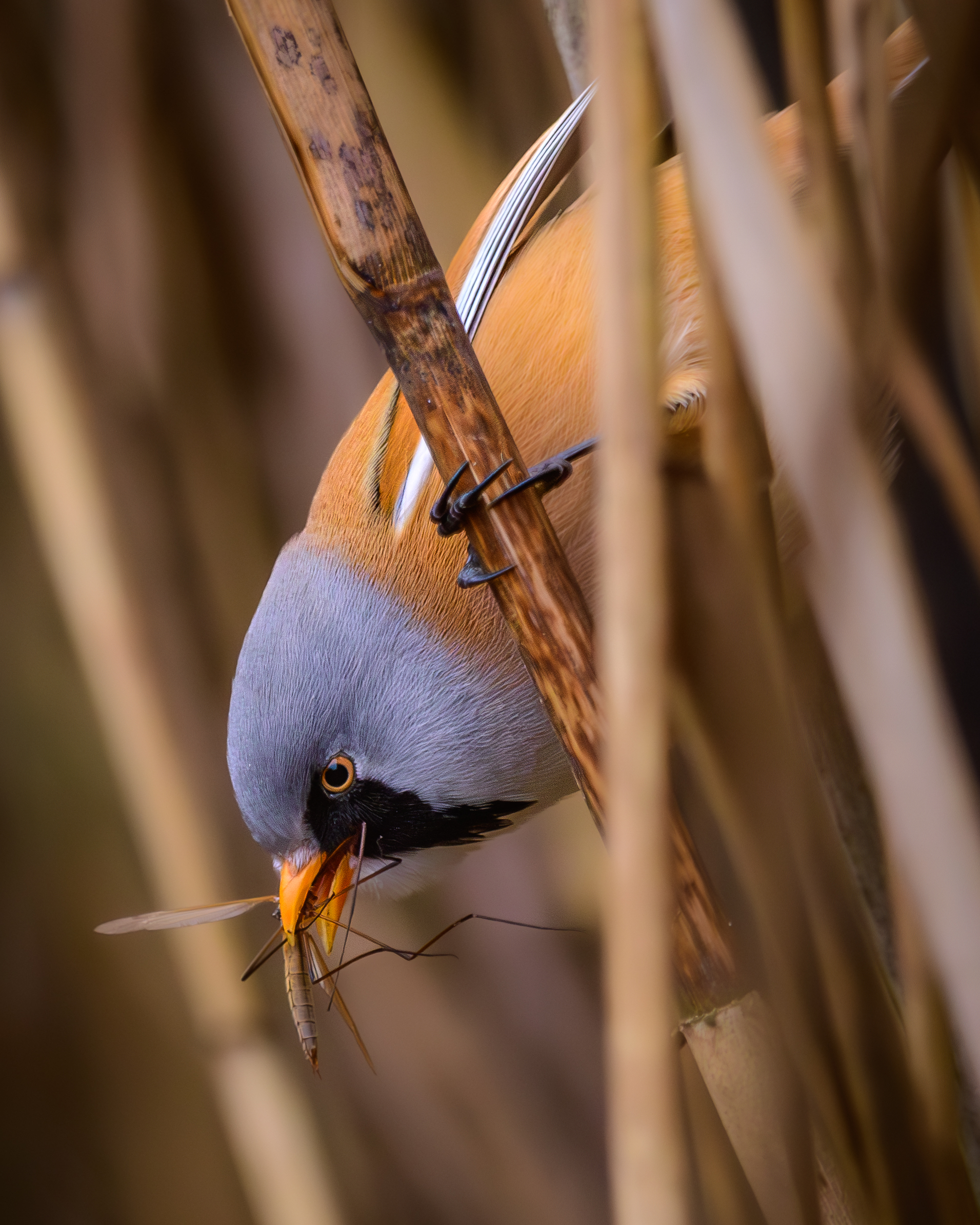
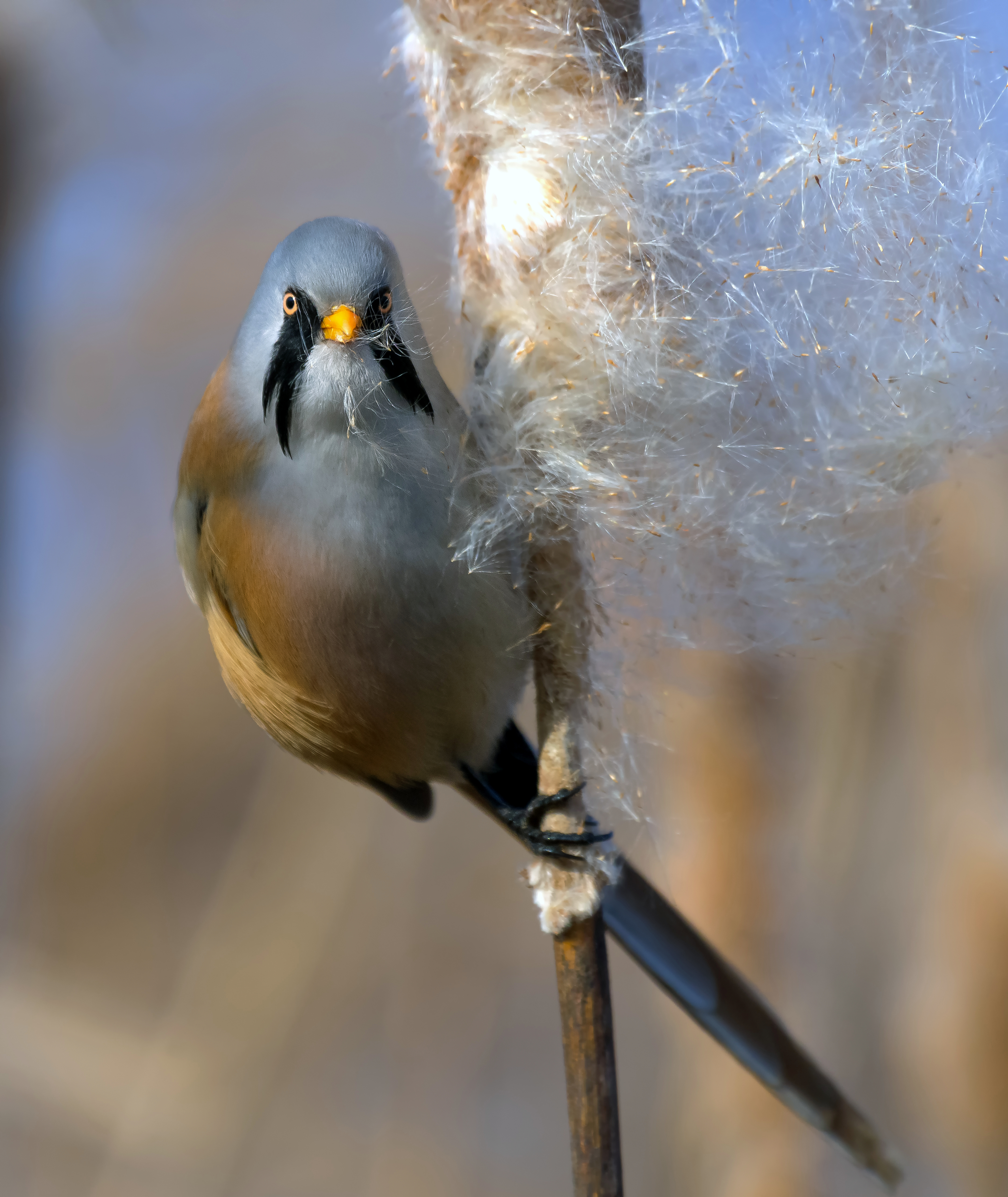
Adult males feeding on a crane fly (left) and bulrush seeds (right)

In the summer, the bearded reedling mostly eats adult insects, their larvae and pupae, and other small invertebrates (springtails, spiders, snails, etc), typically taking rather slow-moving species. This is also the food a pair provides to their nestlings and fledglings. It is common for a nest site to be several hundred metres from the main feeding sites.

In the late autumn and winter, bearded reedlings mostly feed on seeds of common reed, rushes, common nettle, great willowherb and other grassy or sedge-like plants, occasionally forming mixed flocks with other small seed-eating birds like redpolls. Seeds are taken directly from the plant or from the ground, scratching the surface, turning over leaves or even probing into snow. However, during hard or wet winters, access to this important food source can be greatly reduced due to extensive snow cover, ice cover or floods, causing starvation. Significant changes happen in its digestive system to cope with the very different summer and winter diets. The stomach lining is strengthened, and from around September to December, bearded reedlings swallow gritting material, for example coarse sand or small gravel grains, which aids in grinding down the tough seeds.

== Conservation status ==
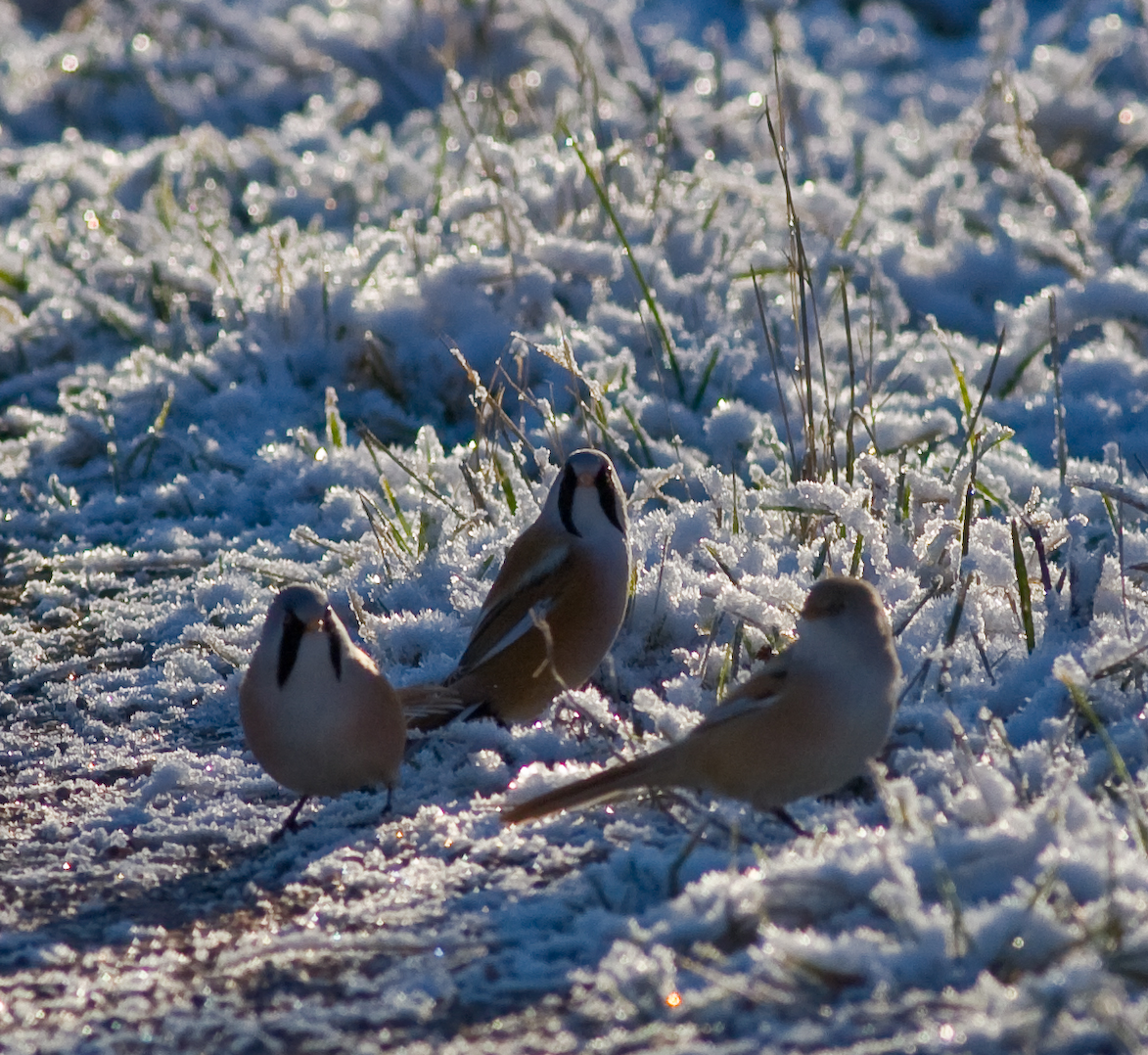
After a hard winter, a bearded reedling population can be greatly reduced

Overall the bearded reedling is widespread with a large population and it is not considered threatened. In Europe alone it is estimated that there are around 500,000 or more adults and the vast majority of the species' range is in Asia, meaning that the total adult population is presumed to be at least 3,000,000. However, due to its lifestyle, getting accurate population estimates is difficult, even for those living in well-studied parts of the world.

Local populations fluctuate greatly from year to year depending on availability of food and habitat. The bearded reedling is vulnerable to hard winters during which many birds may die; even after a complete die-off in a region the species' high breeding capacity and eruptive dispersal behaviour allows it to later be recolonised from other regions. In certain places, habitat loss has caused populations to fall or even disappear entirely. The subspecies P. b. kosswigi, which is only definitely known from the today fully drained Lake Amik (although it may also occur elsewhere in this part of Turkey and in adjacent Syria), has not been recorded since 1962 and could be extinct.

The eruptive dispersal behaviour of the bearded reedling has allowed it to expand its range into new regions. For example, it first established itself as a breeder in Denmark and Sweden in the late 1960s and is now locally fairly common in both countries, though subject to large annual variations depending on severity of winters. This was part of an overall expansion in northwestern Europe during the 1960s, which appears to mainly have been driven by eruptive dispersals from the large population in the Netherlands. In subsequent decades, the species has further expanded into northern Europe, with the first record in Estonia in 1978 and breeding being verified shortly after, and it becoming established as a breeder in Finland in the late 1980s. With global warming, it is likely that further expansions will occur in regions where winters are becoming milder. Conversely, the predicted increase in extreme weather events, especially droughts or winter floods, is likely to have a negative effect on some populations of the bearded reedling.

=== In the United Kingdom and Ireland ===
The population has always fluctuated greatly depending mainly on the severity of winters and the availability of suitable reed beds, which commonly were harvested or drained, but collection of their eggs also played a role.

Up to the early 20th century, the bearded reedling had experienced a period of decline due to habitat loss and persecution. After a series of hard winters in the 1930s and 40s, the remaining population had crashed with a small number of birds surviving in a few locations in southeastern England. In the last of these, the severe 1946–47 winter, the species was almost exterminated and in the following summer there were at most around half a dozen pairs in Norfolk and Suffolk. Subsequently, the bearded reedling's population began to increase and it was speculated that this in part relied on influx from the European mainland; its ability to cross the English Channel was first confirmed in 1965 when several individuals ringed in the Netherlands were found in Great Britain (part of a larger expansion in northwestern Europe from the Netherlands in the 1960s). Since then the British population has significantly increased in both range and numbers, but it remains overall uncommon and quite local. There have been a few later population crashes, probably related to hard winters, including one reduction that happened over several years from the late 1980s to the early 1990s, one over the winter of 2010–11 and one over the winter of 2017–18 (likely due to the February–March cold wave), but none were anywhere near as drastic as the reduction seen in the 1930s–40s and recoveries have been fast.

As of 2019, the vast majority of the United Kingdom's almost 100 known breeding sites are in England, which is home to more than 500 pairs. These are mainly confined to southern and eastern parts of England, but there are also a few sites in the North West. In Scotland there are only three known breeding sites, all in the east, but this includes the largest in the United Kingdom at the mouth of the River Tay in Perth and Kinross, where the species first established itself in the early 1990s but today there are possibly in excess of 250 pairs (the two other Scottish sites are small and irregular). After having again disappeared from Wales as a breeding bird in the early 1980s, it was first confirmed to have returned in 2005 in Gwent and this remains the only place where it is known to breed.

In Ireland, the bearded reedling has historically been considered a rare accidental visitor, but in recent decades there have been confirmed cases of breeding in coastal southeastern parts of the island. There has been a very small breeding population in County Wexford since 2011 (where not known to have bred earlier) and likely in County Wicklow since 2017 (first known Irish breeding was in this county in 1976 and bred again in 1982–85).

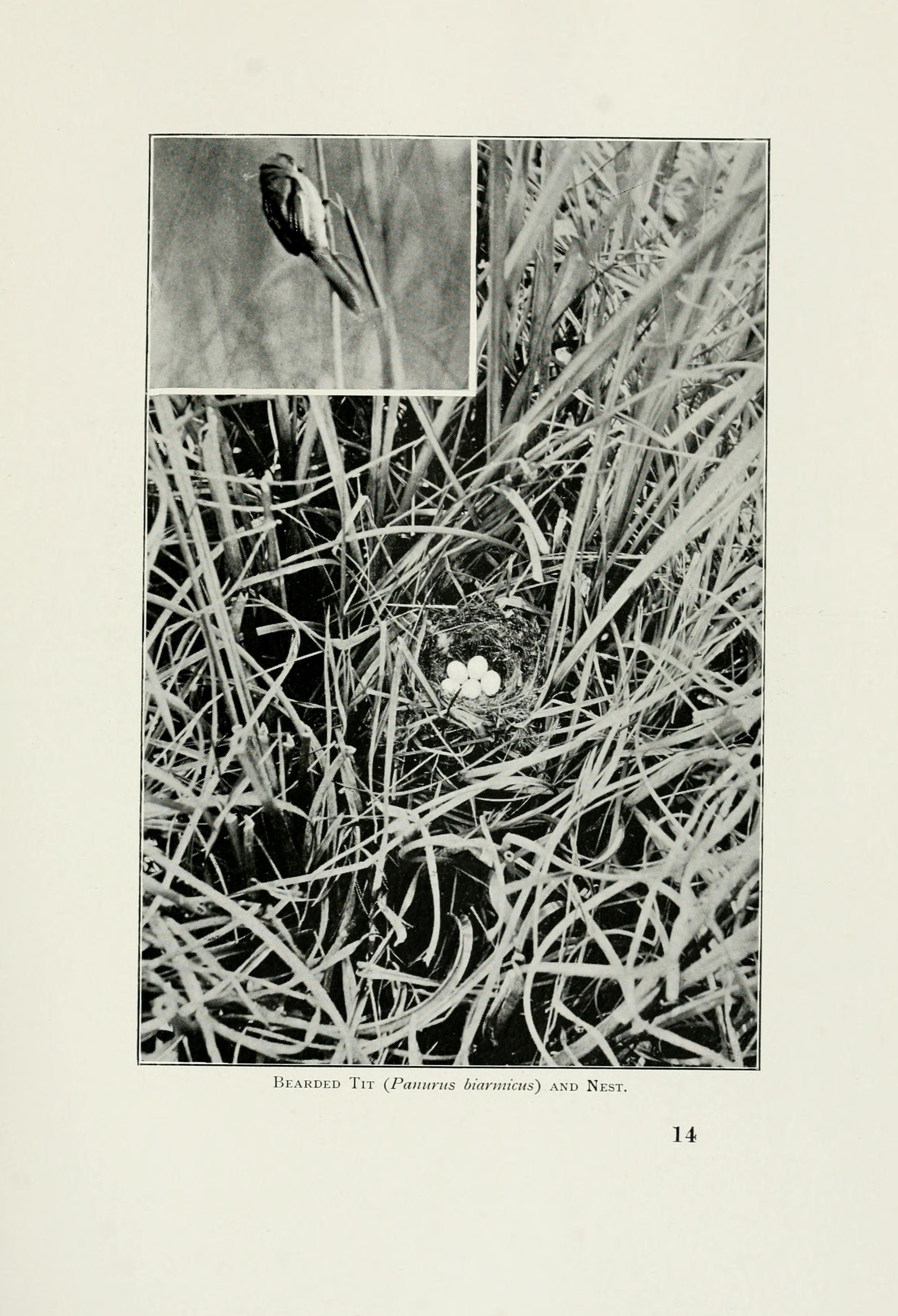
Nest with eggs from Pictures of Bird Life. Published in 1903, author R.B. Lodge noted the species' decline in the UK.

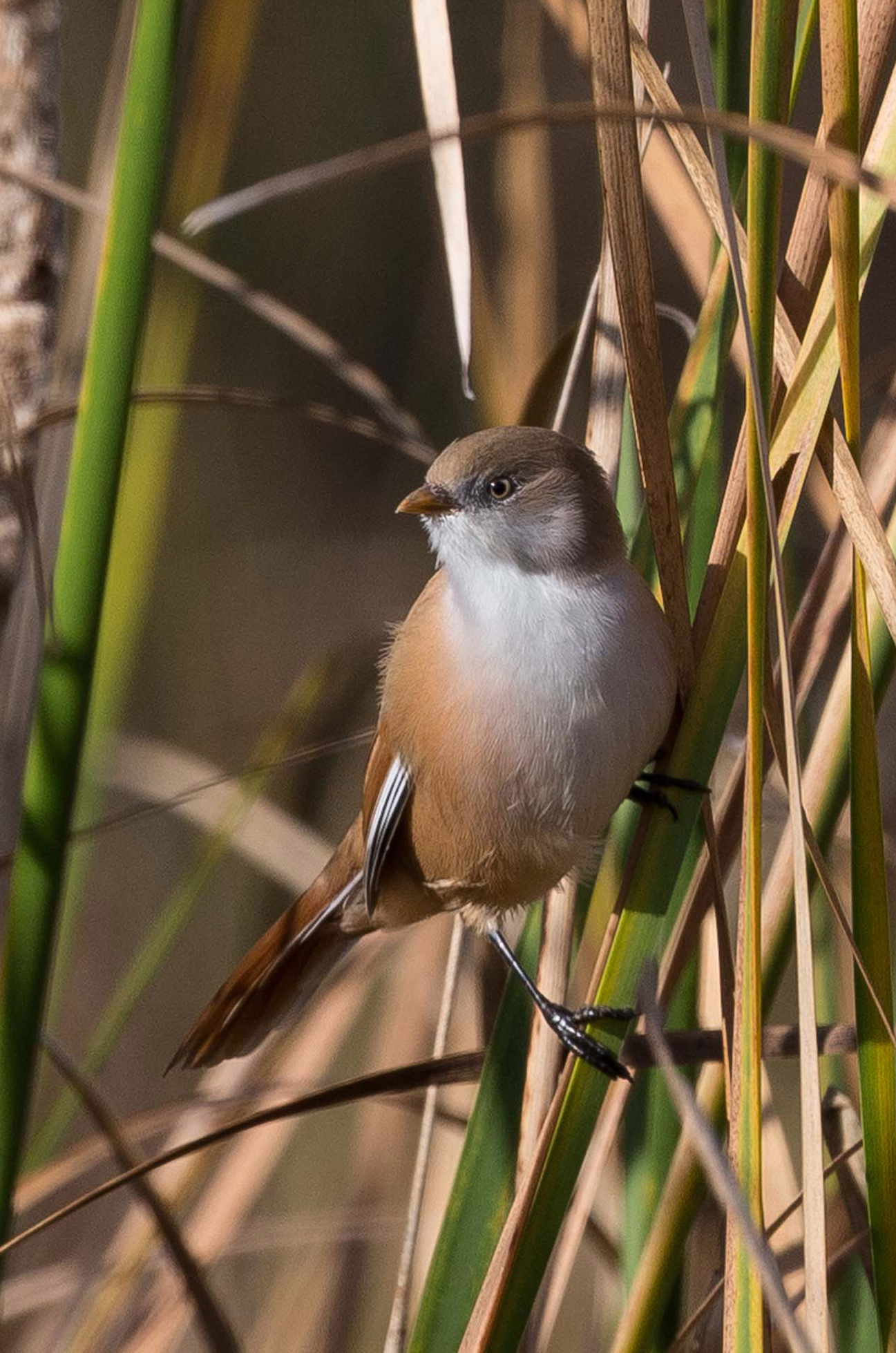
Adult female in Oare Marshes, Kent, England
