= Rhineland Nature Park =

Nature park in North Rhine-Westphalia, Germany

Coordinates: 50°49′10″N 6°51′10″E

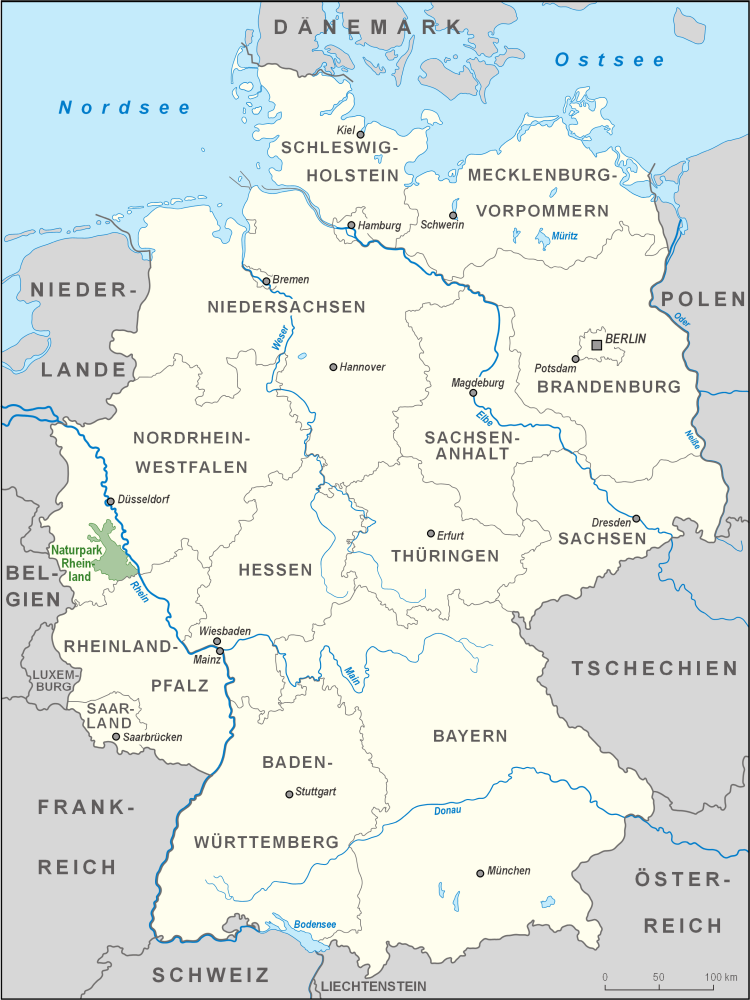
Location map

Logo

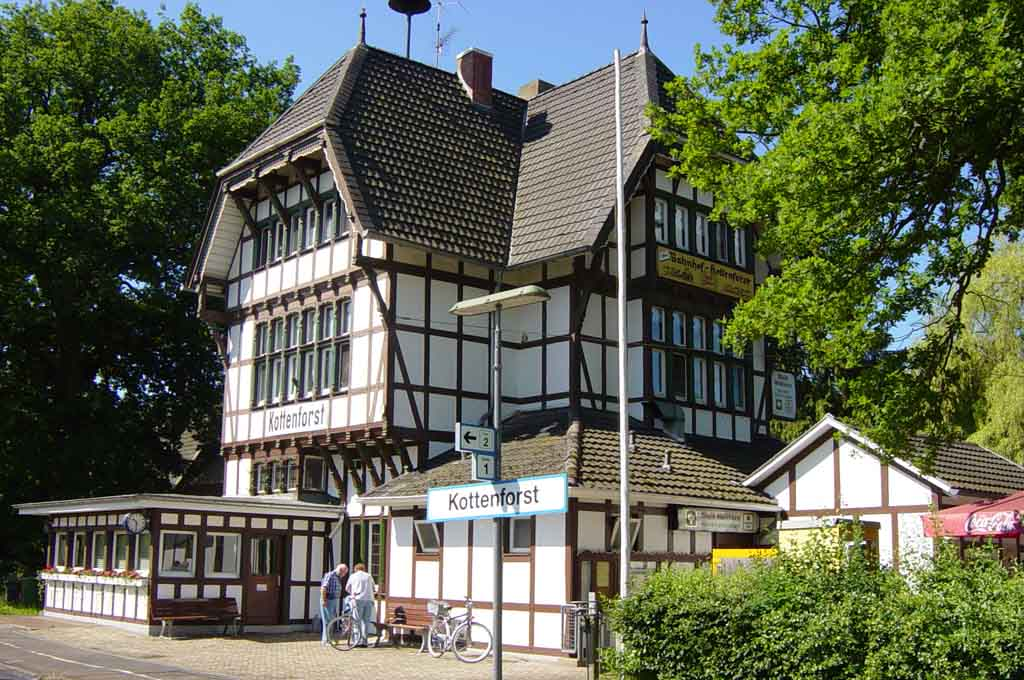
Kottenforst station within the park

Rheinland Nature Park (Naturpark Rheinland) is a nature park in North Rhine-Westphalia, situated between Bergheim, Kerpen, Erftstadt, Euskirchen, Königswinter, Bornheim, Bonn, Brühl, Hürth, Frechen and Pulheim. It covers an area of about 880 km^{2}.

== Ville ==
The Ville is a ridge reaching up to 170 meters above sea level in the central part of the nature park between Cologne and Bonn. It forms the southern foothills of the Ville (from the Germanic *vele, meaning "hill"). The highest point of the Ville is the Glessener Höhe at 205.8 meters. The ridge is largely forested and is clearly demarcated to the east by a slope with a drop of 60 to 100 m down to the Cologne Bay. The northern section of the Ville, as part of the Rhenish lignite mining region, is characterized by former open-pit lignite mining and subsequent reclamation. In the area around Erftstadt, Brühl, Bornheim, and Hürth, some 40 lakes of various sizes have been created, which are now used for swimming, diving, fishing, and recreation (Ville Lake District). In 1920, Adolf Dasbach near Hürth was the first to begin reforesting his mining area with black locust, beech, pine, red oak, and larch trees.

== Ville-Seen-Platte ==
Roughly translated, this would be the 'plateau of lakes in the Ville'.

In the vicinity of Erftstadt, Brühl and Hürth many small and large lakes have been created due to coal mining. The reforestation of the area was begun in 1920 by planting beech, pine, oak and larch trees. Today, there are about forty lakes that have sprung from the mining operations.

List of lakes on the Villen-Seen-Platte:

- Concordia See
- Köttinger See
- Zieselsmaarsee
- Villesee
- Dinnendahlsee
- Liblarer See
- Forellenteich
- Obersee
- Mittelsee
- Untersee
- Bleibtreusee
- Silbersee
- Heider Bergsee
- Gruhlsee
- Margarethenweier
- Schluchtsee
- Franziskussee
- Karauschenweiher
- Teich
- Donatussee
- Zwillingssee
- Entenweiher
- Villenhofer Maar
- Pfingsdorfer See
- Fasanenweiher
- Forsthausweiher
- Lucretiasee
- Berggeistsee
- Gotteshülfeteich
- Otto-Maiglersee
- Waldsee
- Klärteich

== Flora and Fauna ==
On Venusberg along Dottendorfer Allee stand numerous old "pollarded beech trees" These beech trees, which were once “pollarded” at chest height to quickly harvest firewood, took on an extremely bizarre shape as they grew, earning them the nickname “ghost beech trees.” The many damp spots in the Kotten Forest (Kottenforst) allow lily-of-the-valley and anemones to sprout. Otherwise, there is a mixed forest alongside the usual spruce plantations.

The agile frog, a species strictly protected under the Habitats Directive, occurs in an isolated island population within the nature park. It is listed on Germany’s Red List. So far, it has been found in waterlogged areas of the Kottenforst and in the natural shallow lakes near Brühl.
