= Else Schmitt =

German politician (1921–1995)

Else Marie Sofie Schmitt (May 2, 1921 in Brühl, Germany – March 22, 1995 in Cologne, Germany) was a German politician of the Social Democratic Party of Germany. She served as member of city council of Cologne (1961–1984) as well as the first female deputy mayor (1969–1975) of the city.
Schmitt was a member of the Parteirat of her party in the 1970s and contributed substantially to policy changes regarding abortion law (Paragraph 218) policy and Paragraph 175 of her federal ruling party.

The "Bundesverdienstkreuz" was awarded to her in two different classes - 1974 and 1986.

== Literature ==
- Thomas Deres: Die Fraktion beschließt einstimmig, Emons (January 1999).
