= Hans Kummerlöwe =

German ornithologist

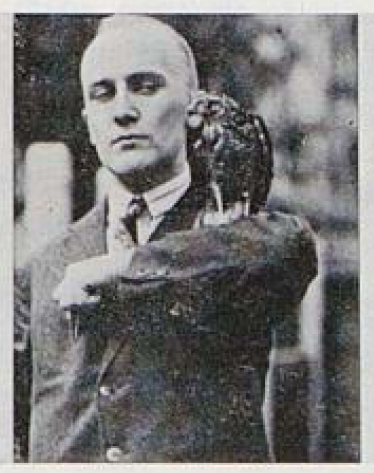
Hans Kummerlöwe

Richard Arthur Hans Kummerlöwe (5 September 1903 in Leipzig – 11 August 1995 in Münich), with the spelling changed to Kumerloeve from 1948 was a German ornithologist who served as an SS Officer during the Second World War. He initially worked as a zoological curator at the Dresden Museum but during the Third Reich he held numerous positions including charge of the Vienna museum after the German annexation of Austria in March 1938. He was involved in the "Nazification" of German and Austrian museums, making them tools for explaining theories of race and genetic purity.

== Life and work ==
Kummerlöwe was the son of Arthur Kummerlöwe, a government inspector in Leipzig. He graduated in 1923 at the Humboldtschule and then went to the University of Leipzig, receiving a summa cum laude doctorate in philosophy on June 7, 1930. He initially worked towards a doctoral thesis under Johannes Meisenheimer on the gonads of female birds. Meisenheimer was a Jew while Kummerlöwe was an active National Socialist leading to differences and finally giving up study. By 1925 Kummerlöwe joined the Nazi party and in November he founded the first student union under the Nazis in Leipzig, the Leipziger Gruppe of the NS-Studentenbundes. In June 1926 he took part in the party day of the NSDAP and joined the Nazi Teaching Association. He trained to become a teacher and taught for a while at Lessing School in Leipzig. He then decided that he was more interested in research than teaching. He then graduated from the Ostwaldschule in Leipzig at the end of 1932. At Leipzig, he was a friend of the ornithologist Günther Niethammer. He joined the DOG (Deutsche Ornithologischen Gessellschaft - the German Ornithological Society) in 1923.

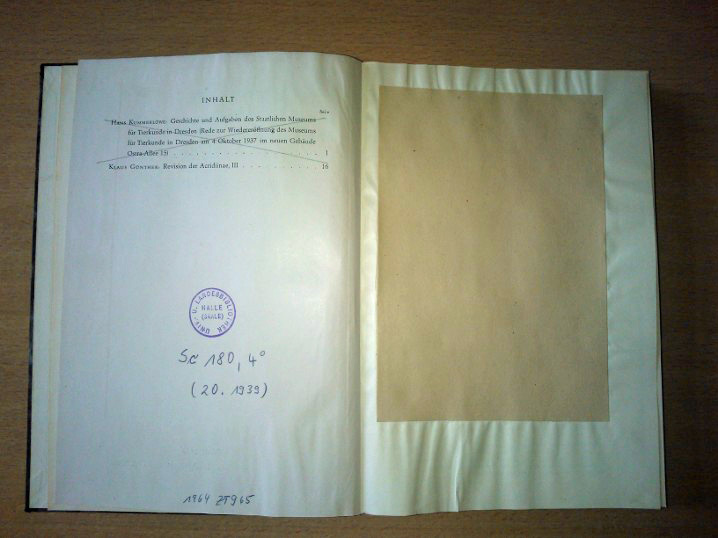
Pages removed from the 1939 volume of Abhandlungen und Berichte aus den Staatlichen Museen für Tierkunde und Völkerkunde in Dresden titled Geschichte und Aufgaben des Staatlichen Museums für Tierkunde in Dresden

Along with Niethammer he made ornithological trips on a small motorcycle in northern and western Turkey in 1933. On 11 December 1935 he took over the management of the Staatliche Museen für Tier- und Völkerkunde Dresden and from 1937 he headed the zoology department at the University of Dresden. He also became in-charge of the Natural History Museum and Museum of Folklore in Vienna after the Annexation of Austria in March 1938. In 1939 he worked on Anthropological Surveys on Polish War Prisoners. Under his direction, the zoological museum was modified so as to serve as a tool for educating the public on how National Socialism was biologically oriented. He attempted to reorganize the Vienna School of Anthropology along with Michael Hesch (1893-1979). He published his politically motivated research in Der Biologe which was taken over by the SS-Ahnenerbe. By positioning biology as a tool for teaching concepts of "blood and soil", he maintained an influential position. After the war, Kummerlöwe changed his name to Kumerloeve, possibly to hide his wartime activities or to make the name closer to its original Swedish form. His publications in the journal "Papers and Reports from the State Museums for Animal Science and Ethnology in Dresden" have been removed from copies in many libraries across Europe. It is thought that in these papers in 1939 and 1940, he expressed his political ideas and it is believed that, after the war, Kummerlöwe managed to purge libraries across Europe holding his writings in journals. Even libraries in Moscow and Leningrad were found to have pages of his articles missing.

He was posted to the Romanian front around 1942 and he was in hospital between September 1944 and September 1945. His apartment in Vienna along with his papers was destroyed by a bomb on 12 March 1945. After the war Kummerlöwe moved to West Germany. He had the spelling of his name officially changed from Kummerlöwe to Kumerloeve on 10 February 1948. He worked as a private researcher in Osnabrück in West Germany and around 1948 as a warden in the bird reserve at Amrum. He claimed that he was not provided any position in the German civil service as his salary during the Third Reich had been beyond what could be provided by the Federal Republic of Germany and a reduction of pay was not allowed. In 1964 he lived at Gräfelfing. In 1970, he was given an honorary position at the Museum Koenig in Bonn to which he bequeathed his collections and diaries. He died in August 1995 following an illness. The subspecies Eremophila alpestris kumerloevei is named after him.

== Writings ==
Pre-war writings under his original spelling include:

- Zimmermann, R., & Kummerlöwe, H. (1944). Beiträge zur Kenntnis der Vogelwelt des Neusiedler Seegebiets. Selbstverlag der Wissenschaftlichen Staatsmuseen.
- Kummerlöwe, H. (1931). Vergleichende Untersuchungen über das Gonadensystem weiblicher Vögel.
- Kummerlöwe, H., & Niethammer, G. (1934). Beiträge zur Kenntnis der Avifauna Kleinasiens (Paphlagonien-Galatien). Journal of Ornithology, 82(4):505-552.
- Kummerlöwe, H., & Froböse, H. (1930). Ein linksseitiges Oviduktrudiment (Müllerscher Gang) bei einem erwachsenen Starmännchen (Sturnus vulgaris L.). Zeitschr. f. mikr.-anat. Forsch, 22:414-26.
- Kummerlöwe, H. (1939). Zur Neugestaltung der Wiener wissenschaftlichen Staatsmuseen. Annalen des Naturhistorischen Museums in Wien, XXIV-XXXIX.

Some of his post-war writings include:

- Kumerloeve, H. (1984). The Waldrapp, Geronticus eremita (Linnaeus, 1758): historical review, taxonomic history, and present status. Biological Conservation, 30(4):363-373.
- Kumerloeve, H. (1984). Domenico Sestini (1750-1832): Aus der Frühzeit zoologischer Forschung im Bosporus-Raum (Türkei). Annalen des Naturhistorischen Museums in Wien. Serie B für Botanik und Zoologie, 345–350.
- Kumerloeve, H. (1976). Leoparden, Panthera pardus tulliana (Valenciennes, 1856). Zentralanatolien//Säugetierkundliche Mitteilungen. Bd, 24:46-48.
- Kumerloeve, H. (1975). Zur Verbreitung der Steinschmätzer (Oenanthe)-Arten in der Türkei. SA Bonn. zool. Beitr, 26:183-198.
- Kumerloeve, H. (1975). Die Säugetiere (Mammalia) der Türkei; Die Säugetiere (Mammalia) Syriens und des Libanon. Zoolog. Staatssammlung.
- Kumerloeve, H. (1969). Van Gölü-Hakkari Bölgesi (Doğu/Güneydoğu Küçük Asya) Kuşları. Fen Fakültesi Basımevi.
- Kumerloeve, H. (1962). Notes on the Birds of the Lebanese Republic: Part 1. 2. University of Baghdad, Iraq Natural History Museum.
