= Hürth =

- Town
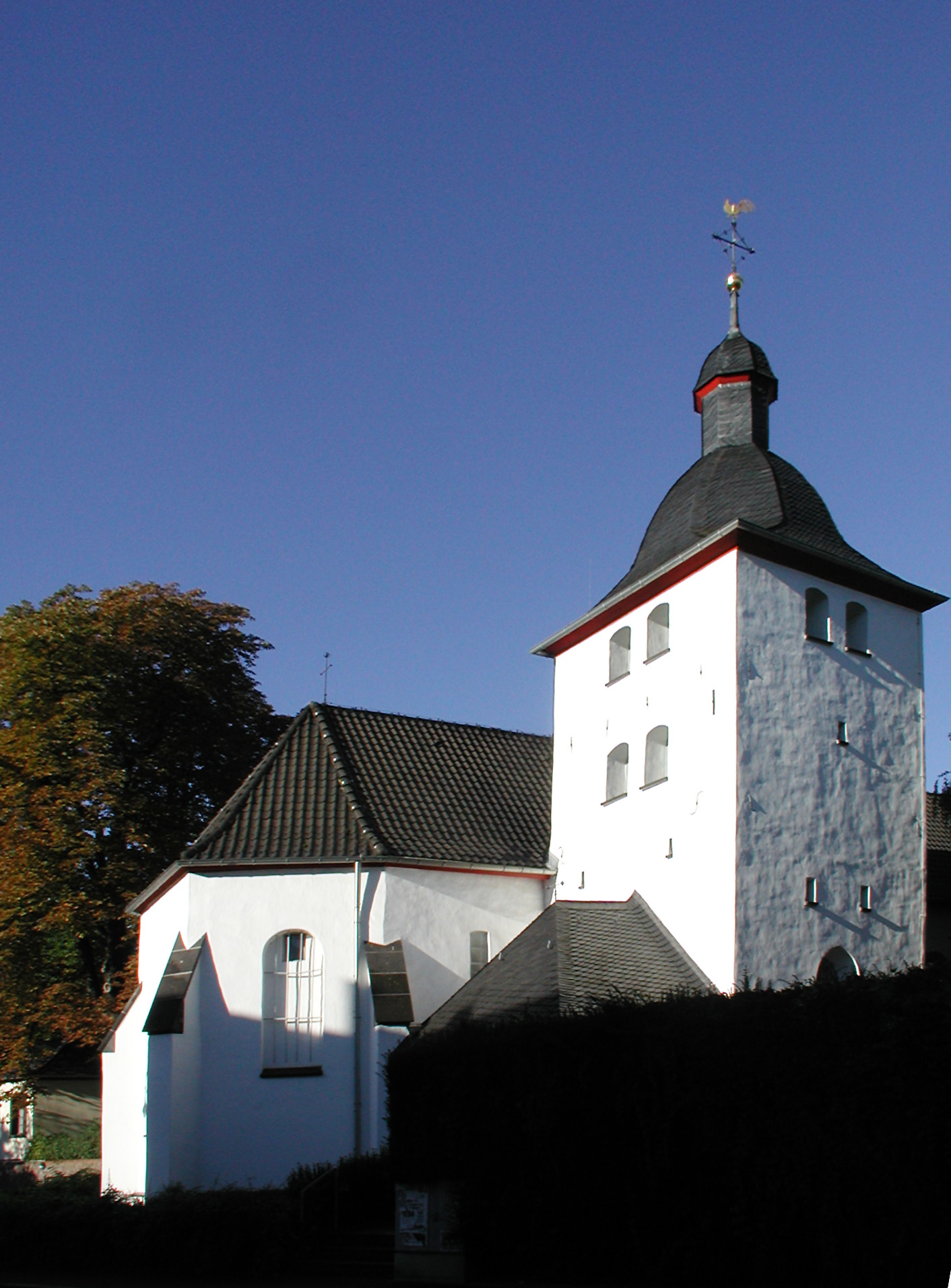
- Saint Catherine parish church

- Coat of arms

- Location of Hürth within Rhein-Erft-Kreis district
- Interactive map of Hürth
- Location within Germany Location within North Rhine-Westphalia
- Coordinates: 50°52′39″N 6°52′34″E
- Country: Germany
- State: North Rhine-Westphalia
- Admin. region: Köln
- District: Rhein-Erft-Kreis
- Subdivisions: 12

Government
  - Mayor (2020–25): Dirk Breuer (CDU)

Area
  - Total: 51.22 km^{2} (19.78 sq mi)
- Elevation: 54–154 m (177–505 ft)

Population (2025-12-31)
  - Total: 61,732
  - Density: 1,205/km^{2} (3,122/sq mi)
- Time zone: UTC+01:00 (CET)
  - Summer (DST): UTC+02:00 (CEST)
- Postal codes: 50354
- Dialling codes: 02233
- Vehicle registration: BM
- Website: www.huerth.de

Hürth (German pronunciation: [hʏʁt]) is a town in the Rhein-Erft-Kreis, North Rhine-Westphalia, Germany. Hürth shares borders with the city of Cologne and is about 6 km to the southwest of Cologne city centre, at the northeastern slope of the natural preserve Kottenforst-Ville. The town consists of thirteen districts, once independent villages, and is distributed over a relatively large area. The municipal area is interspersed with lakes and stretches of forest.

In former times, the Eifel Aqueduct, a Roman aqueduct which supplied the city of Cologne with drinking water, went through Hürth. Remnants of various aqueducts can still be found underground. It is also famous as the birthplace of Michael and Ralf Schumacher.

== Geography ==
Hürth is situated about 6 km to the southwest of Cologne city centre, at the northeastern slope of the Kottenforst-Ville nature reserve.

The town, consisting of thirteen formerly independent villages, is essentially made up of numerous subdivisions and commercial centres distributed over a relatively large area. The municipal area is interspersed with lakes and stretches of forest.

== Coat of arms ==
Hürth's coat of arms shows an eagle from the family coat of arms belonging to the knight Hurth von Schönecken, the cross of Cologne and a cogwheel that refers to the heavy industry. It was awarded to the community on 26 October 1934 by a verdict of the Prussian Ministry of State.

== Districts ==
- Alstädten/Burbach
- Alt-Hürth
- Berrenrath
- Efferen
- Fischenich
- Gleuel
- Hermülheim
- Hürth-Mitte
- Kalscheuren
- Kendenich
- Knapsack
- Sielsdorf
- Stotzheim

== History ==
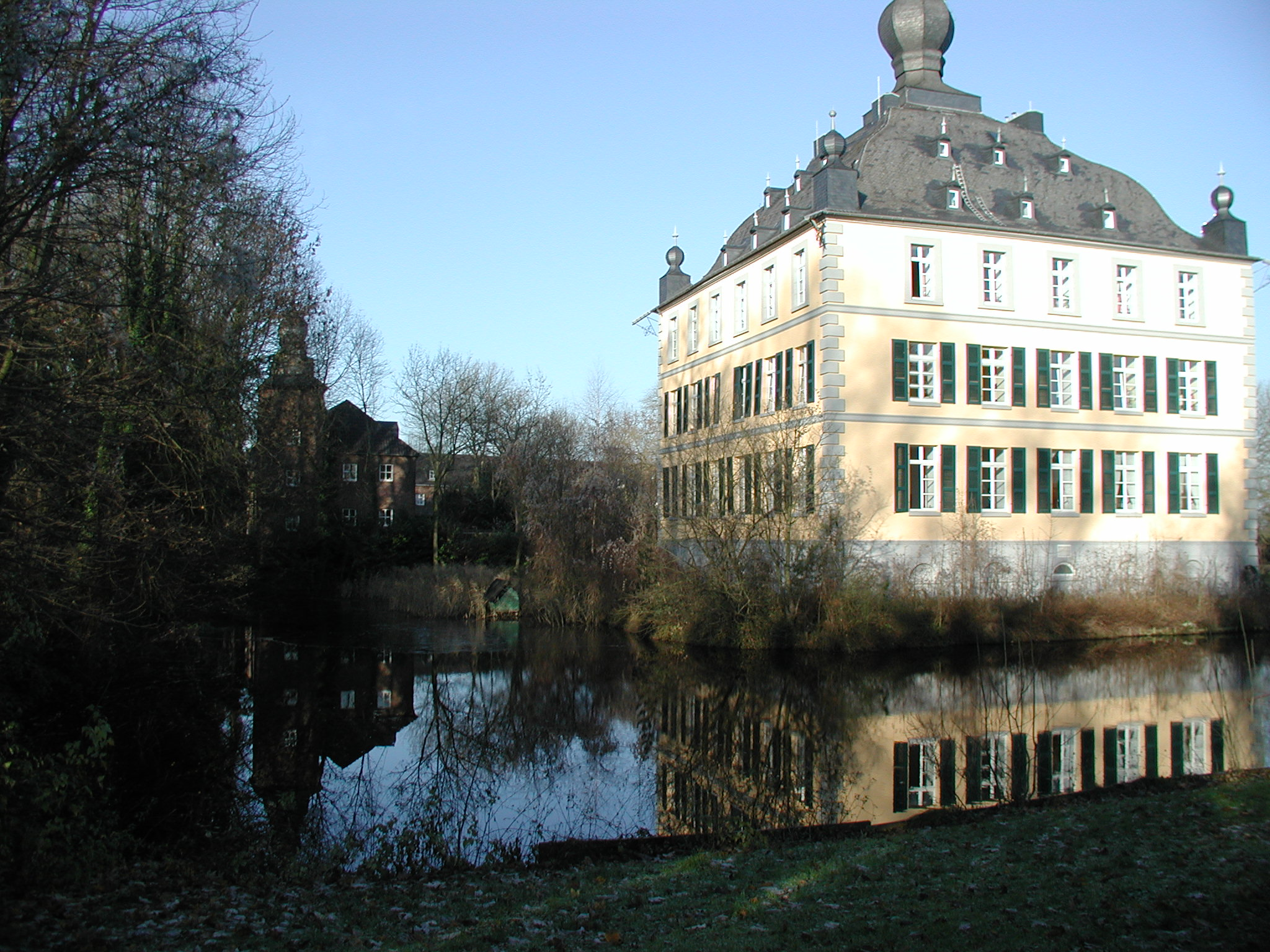
Burg Kendenich

On 1 April 1930 the rural communities of Hürth (with Alstädten and Knapsack), Berrenrath, Fischenich, Gleuel (with Sielsdorf and Burbach), Hermülheim and Kendenich (with Kalscheuren) were united into a new country community called Hürth. After the same year's failed attempt by the city of Cologne, with its then-mayor Konrad Adenauer, to incorporate Efferen, Efferen was associated to Hürth in 1933, in tandem with Stotzheim. This made Hürth the largest rural community of Germany until 1978, when Hürth ceased being a rural community and became a suburb of Cologne as new developments in Efferen closed the gap between the city of Cologne and Hürth.

The country administration of the rural district Cologne was seated in Hürth on 22 November 1963. From 1816, it had been seated in the city of Cologne itself. The administration moved to Bergheim on 3 September 1993.

Hürth is home to the Bundessprachenamt, which was founded on 4 July 1969.

=== Alstädten ===
Alstädten was first mentioned documentarily in 1185.

=== Burbach ===
Burbach was first mentioned documentarily in 1233. Nowadays, Alstädten and Burbach are one district named Alstädten-Burbach.

=== Berrenrath ===
Berrenrath was first mentioned documentarily in 922. The resettlement of Berrenrath onto a now-abandoned brown coal mine was decided on 27 February 1952. This was necessary due to mining plans of the Roddergrube AG. The resettlement was completed in September 1995.

=== Efferen ===
The Efferen district had its first documentary mention as a pastoral town in 1189. The Catholics first humbled themselves with a plain wooden church. On 6 June 1869 this church was replaced with a solid building, consecrated by auxiliary bishop Baudri.

On 31 October 1944 large parts of Efferen, including the church and the hospital, were destroyed in an air raid; thirty-six people died.

On 20 December 1953 Boue, a member of the church assembly, consecrated the newly built Evangelic church, designed by architect Jürgen Körber. Two years later, on 25 November 1956, a new Roman Catholic church, which was designed by the Cologne architects Wolfram Borgard and Fritz Volmer, was consecrated by auxiliary bishop Wilhem Cleven.

=== Fischenich ===
Fischenich was first mentioned documentarily in 1189.

=== Gleuel ===
Gleuel was first mentioned documentarily in 898.

=== Hermülheim ===
Hermülheim was first mentioned documentarily in 943.

In Hermülheim the town's two grammar schools are located: the Ernst-Mach-Gymnasium and the Albert-Schweizer-Gymnasium.

=== Hürth (Alt-Hürth) ===
Hürth was first mentioned documentarily in 1185.

=== Hürth-Mitte ===
The building of the residential area Hürth-Mitte, that was begun in 1964 according to a decision by the municipal council in 1960, had the aim of establishing a "city centre" in the approximate geographic centre of Hürth. The decision was evidently benefitted by the constantly raising population in those times. This was partially completed by 1985, with the new town hall and community centre having been erected. Hürth-Mitte is also the site of the Hürth Park, a shopping mall, which serves as the town's economic and social centre. Hürth-Mitte is not a district for itself, but officially belongs to Hermülheim.

=== Kalscheuren ===
Kalscheuren was first mentioned documentarily in 1305.

=== Kendenich ===
Kendenich was first mentioned documentarily in 941.

=== Knapsack ===
Knapsack, its first documentary mention in 1566, started to emerge into a notable town after 1900 due to establishment and development of industry (1906 the Knapsack-Griesheim AG, later known as the Hoechst AG; 1913 construction of the brown coal power plant Goldenberg-Werk).

Due to environmental constraints, 4,000 citizens had to be resettled between the years 1969 and 1979.

=== Sielsdorf ===
Sielsdorf was first mentioned documentarily in 898.

=== Stotzheim ===
Stotzheim was first mentioned documentarily in 1223.

== Population ==
Historical population

Year	Pop.	±% p.a.
1965	49,148	—
1970	52,174	+1.20%
1975	51,691	−0.19%
1980	50,793	−0.35%
1985	50,741	−0.02%
1990	50,808	+0.03%
1995	52,351	+0.60%

Year	Pop.	±% p.a.
2000	53,261	+0.35%
2005	55,169	+0.71%
2010	57,922	+0.98%
2015	59,496	+0.54%
2020	59,525	+0.01%
2025	61,732	+0.73%

Source: Landesdatabank Nordrhein-Westfalen

== Sights ==
In former times, the Eifel Aqueduct, a Roman aqueduct which supplied the city of Cologne with drinking water, went through Hürth. A couple of springs and streams in today's municipal area were used for that purpose before the Eifel aqueduct was built. Remnants of the aqueducts can still be found in the underground of the city.

== Facility 4101, Tower 93 ==
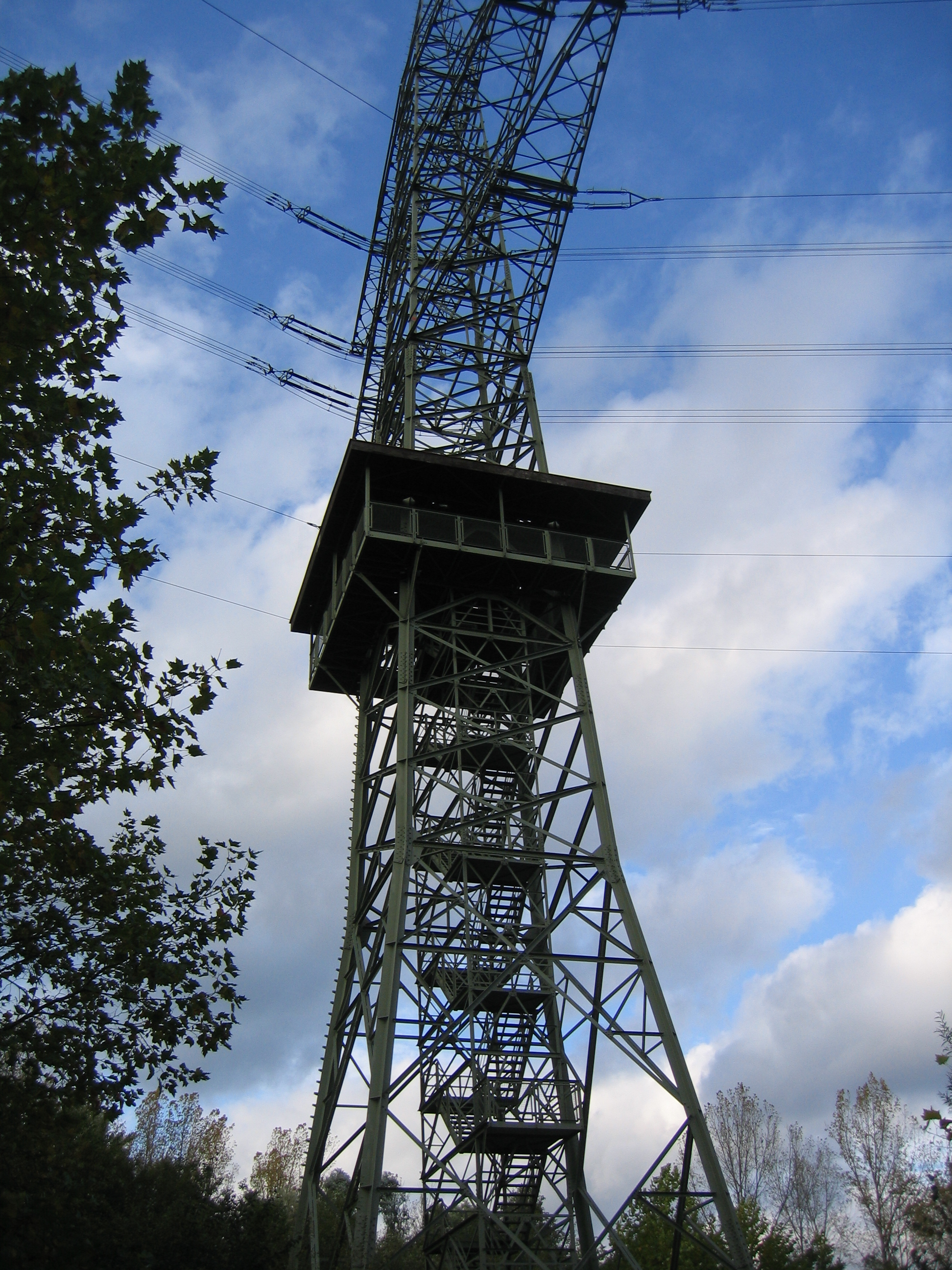
Facility 4101, Tower 93 with observation platform in 2005

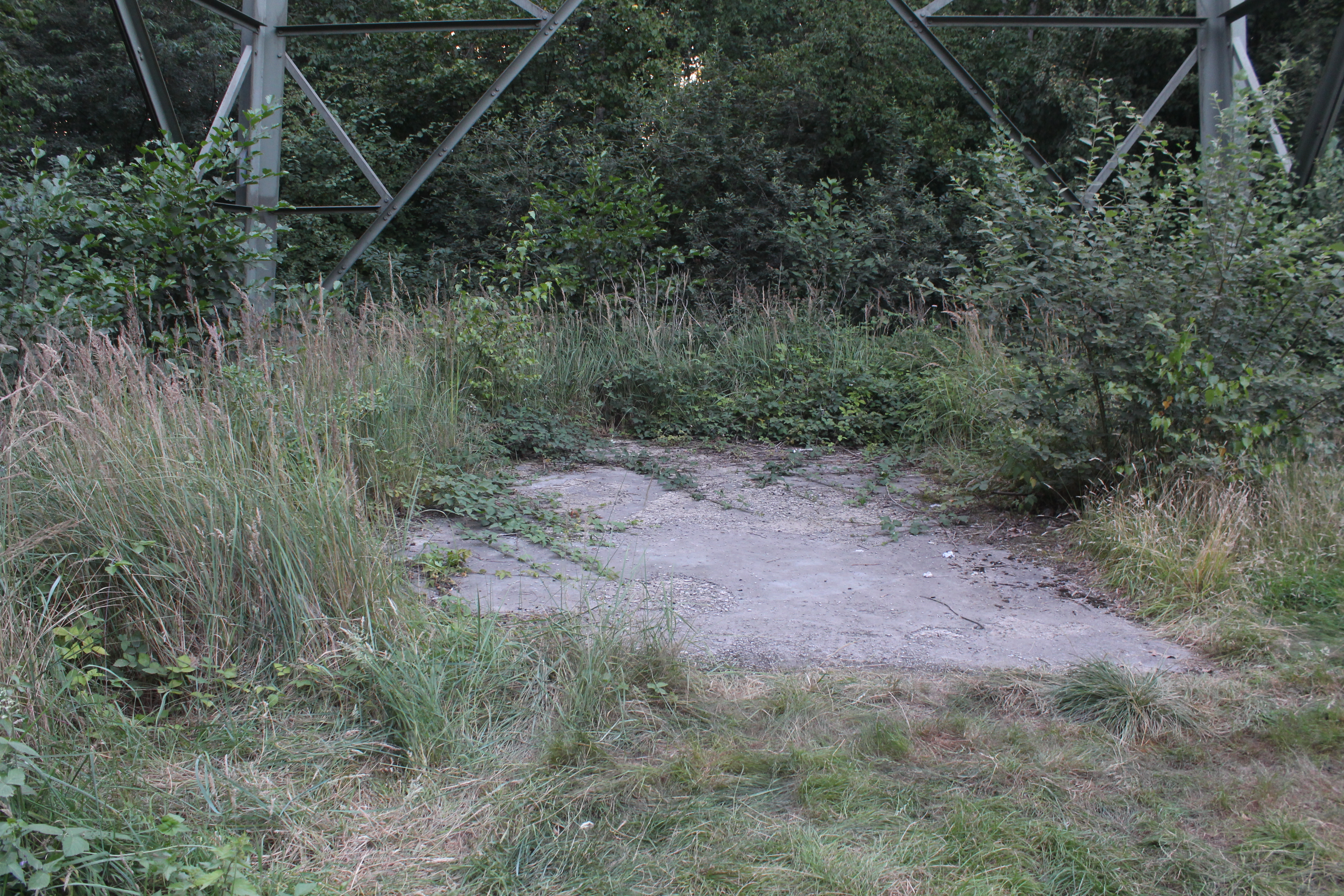
The concrete plate between the feet of the pylon, on which once stood the scaffold with the staircase to the observation deck

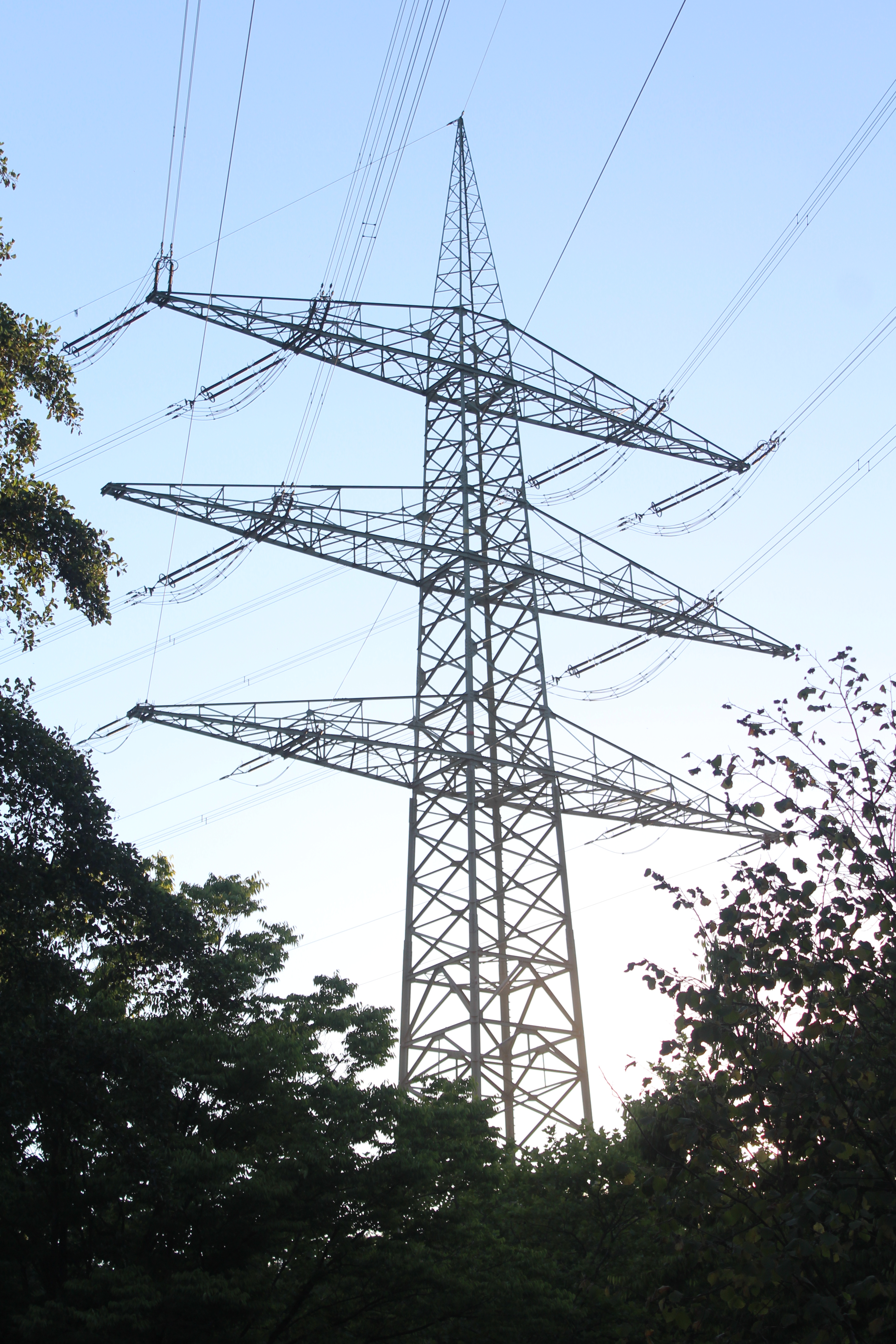
Upper part of Facility 4101, Tower 93. At the place where one can see the lattice structure in the shape of an inverted "v" in the body of the pylon, there was once the observation deck.

Tower 93 of Facility 4101, situated north of Bleibtreusee at 50°50′52.57″N 6°51′32.54″E, is a 74.84 metres tall electricity pylon, capable of carrying four 380 kV-circuits, which was built in 1975 as strainer for the double-circuit 380 kV-line Oberzier-Sechtem. In 1977 a covered public observation deck, accessible by a staircase in the centre of the pylon, was installed at a height of 27 metres on this tower, which was in all probability the only observation deck ever installed on an electricity pylon. In 2002 two single-phase AC circuits of the 110 kV-line Cologne-Sindorf used by the German railway company, DB AG, were installed on its lowest crossbar.

In 2010 the observation platform, including the staircase, was removed, after repeated vandalism, which concerned also parts important for the integrity of the pylon. Today only a concrete plate between its legs and a pattern in the form of an inverted "v" in its lattice structure remember to the former observation deck.

=== External links ===
- http://skyscraperpage.com/diagrams/?buildingID=120476
- Emporis.com

== Notable people ==
=== From Hürth ===
- Michael Schumacher (born 1969), 7-time Formula One World Champion
- Ralf Schumacher (born 1975), Formula One driver, brother of Michael Schumacher, uncle of Mick Schumacher
- Ferdinand von Lüninck (1755–1825), Prince-Bishop of Corvey and Bishop of Münster
- Paul Henckels (1885–1967), actor
- Josef Metternich (1915–2005), opera singer, music and singing teacher
- Wolfgang von Trips (1928–1961), Formula One driver
- Jean Breuer (1938–2025), cyclist (World Championships 1972, 1974)
- Reinhard Kleist (born 1970), comic artist and graphic designer

=== Other ===
- Anne Will, (born 1966), television journalist and moderator, went to school in Hürth
- Karl-Josef Assenmacher, former football referee
- André Greipel, German cyclist, winner of several Tour de France stages and German champions 2013 and 2014
- Ralf Grabsch, cyclist
- Sarah Engels, second place in the 8th season of "Deutschland sucht den Superstar (Germany seeks the superstar)", currently resides in Hürth

== Public transport ==
Since 29 September 1997 Hürth has a bus network that covers most of the city's area. There are six bus routes, numbered 711 to 720, by the city's public transport corporation, and another five lines that are not associated with the SVH, having only a number of bus stops in Hürth.

Hürth-Kalscheuren station is located in Kalscheuren and operated by Deutsche Bahn. Two Regionalbahn services stop each hour, connecting to Cologne, Bonn and Euskirchen, while other Intercity and Regional-Express pass through without stopping.

Additionally, Hürth is connected to Cologne and Bonn via the Stadtbahn line 18 of the Cologne Stadtbahn.

All local public transport, including that of the Deutsche Bahn, is subject to the Verkehrsverbund Rhein-Sieg, which is a combine of public transport organizations, setting unified prices for the whole of the combine.

== Twin towns – sister cities ==
Hürth is twinned with:

- Nissewaard, Netherlands (1966)
- Thetford, England, United Kingdom (1966)
- Argelès-sur-Mer, France (1988)
- Kabarnet, Kenya (1988)
- Skawina, Poland (1996)
- Burhaniye, Turkey (2011)
- Peremyshliany, Ukraine (2021)

== Literature ==
- Clemens Klug: "Hürth - wie es war, wie es wurde" (1961)
- Herbert Sinz: "Auf der grünen Wiese"
- Herbert Sinz, Heinrich Schnitzler: "Hürth in alten Bildern" (1980), ISBN 3-88265-052-4
- Heinrich Schnitzler: "50 Jahre Ortsgemeinschaft Hürth-Gleuel" (1985)
- Helmut Neßeler: "Hürth wie es früher war" (1999), ISBN 3-86134-585-4
- Manfred Faust: "Geschichte der Stadt Hürth" (2009), ISBN 978-3-7616-2282-7
- Raymund Gottschalk: "Römer und Franken in Hürth" (2014), ISBN 978-3-7749-3928-8
