= Erika Reihlen =

Erika Reihlen (born 2 August 1936) is a former president of the German Evangelical Church Assembly. She served from 1991 to 1993. She is active in women's causes and on the BORA Women's Shelter Board of Directors. She has also been involved in Protestant/Catholic dialogue and was a children's dentist. Her husband Helmut is also a known figure in the church.
