= Kottenforst =

Forest in the southwest of Bonn, Germany

Coordinates: 50.6677°N 07.0227°E

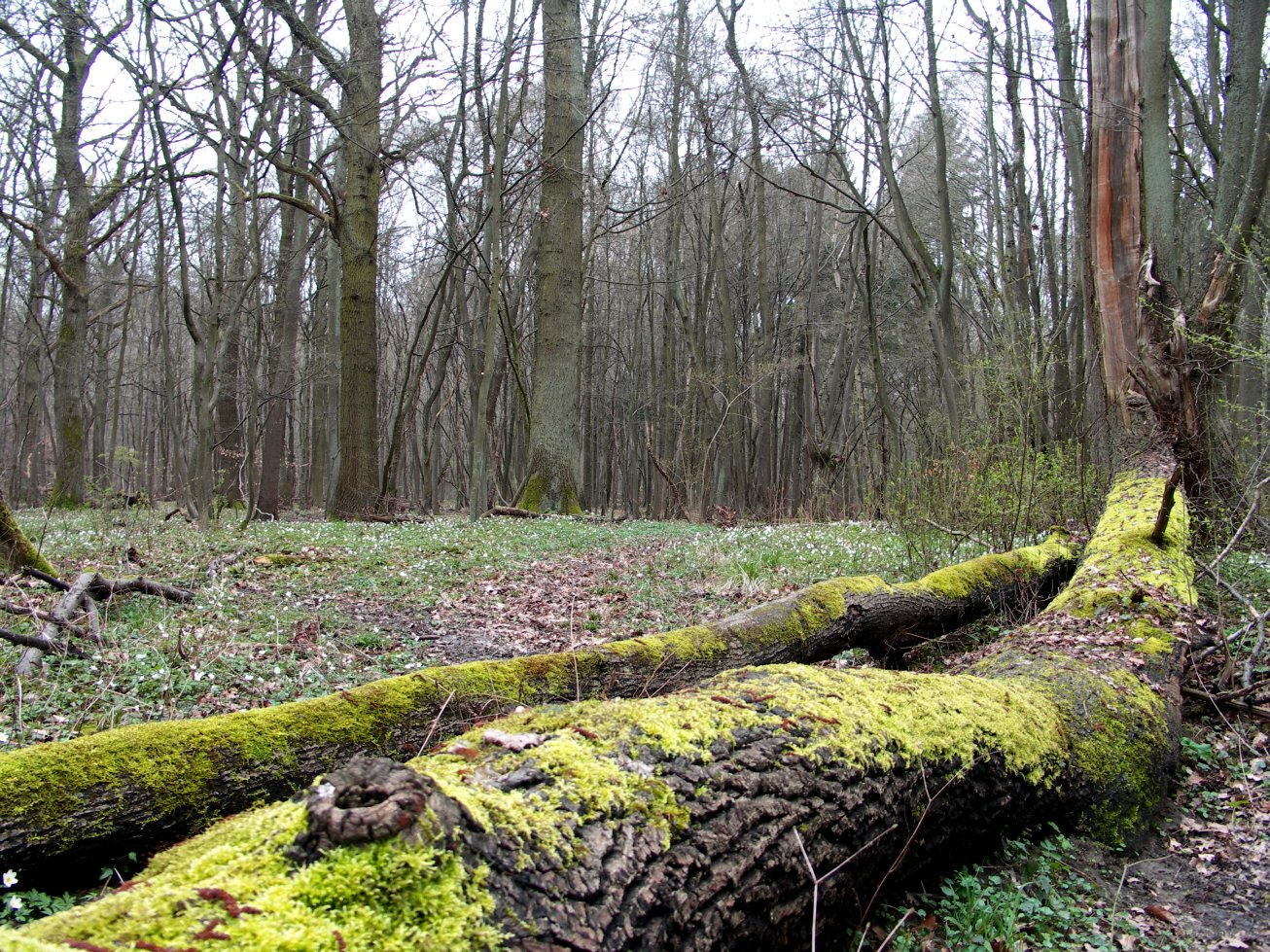
The Kottenforst in spring

The Kottenforst is a large forest, about 40 km^{2} in area, to the south, west and north of the city of Bonn in Germany. It is part of the Rhineland Nature Park (1,045 km^{2}) and forms its eastern side.

== Geography ==
The Kottenforst is the southern part of a highland region that lies about 150 to 180 m above sea level (NHN), and known as the Ville, which drops steeply towards the east into the Rhine Valley, but whose western slopes descend more gradually towards the Swist and Erft rivers, forming a geological half-horst. The part of the natural region of Ville, which is not dominated by the brown coal mining of the Rhenish Brown Coal Field, is also called Waldville.

The Kottenforst is divided into a southeastern section between Meckenheim, Bad Godesberg and Bonn, into which areas of natural open country intrude in places, such as the Katzenlochbach Valley, and a northern area between Heimerzheim, Buschhoven and Alfter. Between the two areas lies the village of Witterschlick.

The Kottenforst once was the location of Schloss Herzogsfreude, the hunting lodge of Clemens August of Bavaria, Prince-Elector and Archbishop of Cologne, who loved to go hunting here and also erected the many avenues in the forest.

== Nature Park ==
In 1959, the Kottenforst served as the nucleus of the Kottenforst Nature Park, which was renamed the Kottenforst-Ville Nature Park following an expansion in 1967 and has been known as the Rhineland Nature Park since 2005—after several additional expansions.

== Literature ==
- Werner D´hein: Kottenforst. 13 Wanderungen durch eine historische Kulturlandschaft. Gaasterland-Verlag, Düsseldorf, 2008, ISBN 978-3-935873-21-5.
- Bruno P. Kremer (also ed.): Der Kottenforst. Eine rheinische Kultur- und Erholungslandschaft. Wienand, Cologne, 1999, ISBN 3-87909-648-1.
- Albert Hexges: Der Kottenforst. Ein Beitrag zur Forstgeschichte Kurkölns unter besonderer Berücksichtigung der Entwicklung des Waldeigentums, des Forstrechts, der Forstorganisation und der Waldnutzung. In: Bonner Geschichtsblätter, Band 35. Bonn, 1984, pp. 23–98.
- Gemeinde Swisttal, Heinz Doepgen (ed.): 900 Jahre Heimerzheim. G. Grote'sche Verlagsbuchhandlung, Cologne and Berlin, ISBN 3-7745-6333-0.
- Arbeitskreis Heimat im Ortsausschuss Heimerzheim (ed.): Heimerzheim im Wandel der Zeiten.

== Sources ==
- Nature park map 1:50,000 by the State Survey Office of NRW Kottenforst-Ville, and the hiking map of the Eifel Club in cooperation with the forestry office of Kottenforst, 1980 (with description on the reverse side)
