= Johannes Meisenheimer =

German zoologist

Johannes Meisenheimer (30 June 1873 Griesheim - 24 February 1933 Leipzig) was a German zoologist.

He was a professor at the University of Leipzig.

== Bibliography ==
- Meisenheimer J. (1906). Die Pteropoden der deutschen Sud-polar Expedition 1901-1903. In: Deutsche Sudpolar-Expedition 1901–1903. 9 (Zool.), 1(2): 92-152, pl. 5–7.
- (1908). Entwicklungsgeschichte der Tiere. Leipzig.
- (1912). Die Weinbergschnecke Helix pomatia L. Leipzig.
- (1921–1930). Geschlecht und Geschlechter. Jena.
- (1923). Die Vererbungslehre in gemeinverständlicher Darstellung ihres Inhalts. Jena.
