= Essig =

Essig is a German surname meaning "vinegar". Notable people with the surname include:

- Christian Essig (born 1986), German footballer
- David Essig (born 1945), Canadian singer-songwriter
- Edward Oliver Essig (1884–1964), American entomologist
- George Emerick Essig (1838–1923), American painter and etcher
- Marty Essig (born 1975), Canadian sailor

== See also ==
- Essig, Minnesota, unincorporated community in Brown County, Minnesota, United States
- Essig (Swisttal), a village in North Rhine-Westphalia, Germany
