= 1996 United States House of Representatives elections in Pennsylvania =

- November 5, 1996

All 21 Pennsylvania seats to the United States House of Representatives
	Majority party	Minority party
Party	Democratic	Republican
Last election	11	10
Seats won	11	10
Seat change	Steady	Steady
Popular vote	2,222,863	2,037,508
Percentage	51.50%	47.20%
Swing	▲7.25%	▼7.10%

Democratic hold Republican hold
Democratic
50–60%
60–70%
70–80%
80–90%
Republican
50–60%
60–70%
70–80%

The 1996 United States House of Representatives elections in Pennsylvania were held on November 5, 1996, to elect the twenty-one members of Pennsylvania's delegation to the United States House of Representatives. The elections coincided with the presidential election, other elections to the House of Representatives, elections to the United States Senate, and various state and local elections. Primary elections were held April 23, 1996.

== Overview ==
United States House of Representatives elections in Pennsylvania, 1996
Party	Votes	Percentage	Seats Before	Seats After	+/–
Democratic	2,222,863	51.50%	11	11	0
Republican	2,037,508	47.20%	10	10	0
Reform	21,727	0.50%	0	0	0
Libertarian	11,921	0.28%	0	0	0
Independent	6,859	0.16%	0	0	0
Constitution	5,714	0.13%	0	0	0
Natural Law	5,383	0.12%	0	0	0
Francis Worley Congress	3,194	0.07%	0	0	0
Socialist Equality	713	0.02%	0	0	0
Write-in	521	0.01%	0	0	0
Totals	4,316,403	100.00%	21	21	–

== Match-up summary ==
District	Democratic		Republican		Others		Total		Result
District	Votes	%	Votes	%	Votes	%	Votes	%	Result
District 1	145,210	87.50%	20,734	12.49%	1	0.00%	165,945	100.00%	Democratic hold
District 2	168,887	87.99%	23,047	12.01%	3	0.00%	191,937	100.00%	Democratic hold
District 3	121,120	68.90%	54,681	31.10%	0	0.00%	175,801	100.00%	Democratic hold
District 4	142,621	64.20%	79,448	35.76%	98	0.04%	222,167	100.00%	Democratic hold
District 5	76,627	39.70%	116,303	60.26%	73	0.04%	193,003	100.00%	Republican hold
District 6	115,193	58.55%	80,061	40.70%	1,475	0.75%	196,729	100.00%	Democratic hold
District 7	79,875	32.38%	165,087	66.93%	1,704	0.69%	246,666	100.00%	Republican hold
District 8	79,856	35.28%	133,749	59.10%	12,717	5.62%	226,322	100.00%	Republican hold
District 9	50,650	26.27%	142,105	73.70%	67	0.03%	192,822	100.00%	Republican hold
District 10	75,536	36.22%	124,670	59.78%	8,334	4.00%	208,540	100.00%	Republican hold
District 11	128,258	68.00%	60,339	31.99%	12	0.01%	188,609	100.00%	Democratic hold
District 12	136,815	69.99%	58,643	30.00%	23	0.01%	195,481	100.00%	Democratic hold
District 13	120,220	48.87%	120,304	48.91%	5,455	2.22%	245,979	100.00%	Republican hold
District 14	122,922	60.68%	78,921	38.96%	735	0.36%	202,578	100.00%	Democratic hold
District 15	109,812	54.81%	82,803	41.33%	7,748	3.87%	200,363	100.00%	Democratic hold
District 16	78,598	37.50%	124,511	59.40%	6,493	3.10%	209,602	100.00%	Republican hold
District 17	57,911	27.76%	150,678	72.23%	27	0.01%	208,616	100.00%	Republican hold
District 18	120,410	56.01%	86,829	40.39%	7,751	3.61%	214,990	100.00%	Democratic hold
District 19	74,944	35.86%	130,716	62.55%	3,303	1.58%	208,963	100.00%	Republican hold
District 20	113,394	53.89%	97,004	46.10%	4	0.00%	210,402	100.00%	Democratic hold
District 21	104,004	49.32%	106,875	50.68%	9	0.00%	210,888	100.00%	Republican hold
Total	2,222,863	51.50%	2,037,508	47.20%	56,032	1.30%	4,316,403	100.00%	

Popular vote
Democratic	51.50%
Republican	47.20%
Other	1.30%

House seats
Democratic	52.38%
Republican	47.62%

== District 1 ==
1996 Pennsylvania's 1st congressional district election
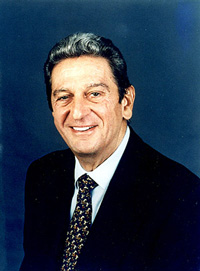

Nominee	Thomas M. Foglietta	James Cella
Party	Democratic	Republican
Popular vote	145,210	20,734
Percentage	87.50%	12.49%
U.S. Representative before election
Thomas M. Foglietta
Democratic
Elected U.S. Representative
Thomas M. Foglietta
Democratic

=== Democratic primary ===
==== Candidates ====
===== Nominee =====
- Thomas M. Foglietta, incumbent U.S. Representative

==== Eliminated in primary ====
- John L. Braxton

==== Primary results ====
Democratic primary results
Party	Candidate	Votes	%
Democratic	Thomas M. Foglietta (incumbent)	36,426	73.35
Democratic	John L. Braxton	13,237	26.65
Total votes		49,663	100.00

=== Republican primary ===
==== Candidates ====
===== Nominee =====
- James D. Cella

==== Primary results ====
Republican primary results
Party	Candidate	Votes	%
Republican	James D. Cella	6,516	100.00
Total votes		6,516	100.00

=== General election ===
Pennsylvania's 1st congressional district, 1996
Party	Candidate	Votes	%
Democratic	Thomas M. Foglietta (incumbent)	145,210	87.50
Republican	James D. Cella	20,734	12.49
Write-in		1	0.00
Total votes		165,945	100.00
Democratic hold			

==== By county (Note: Vote totals summed from the precinct data file published by the Pennsylvania Department of State do not match the results officially published by the U.S. House of Representatives.) ====
County	Thomas M. Foglietta Democratic		James Cella Republican		Margin		Total votes cast
County	#	%	#	%	#	%	Total votes cast
Delaware	14,250	67.18%	6,961	32.82%	7,289	34.36%	21,211
Philadelphia	130,965	90.48%	13,773	9.52%	117,192	80.96%	144,738
Totals	145,215	87.51%	20,734	12.49%	124,481	75.01%	165,949

== District 2 ==
1996 Pennsylvania's 2nd congressional district election
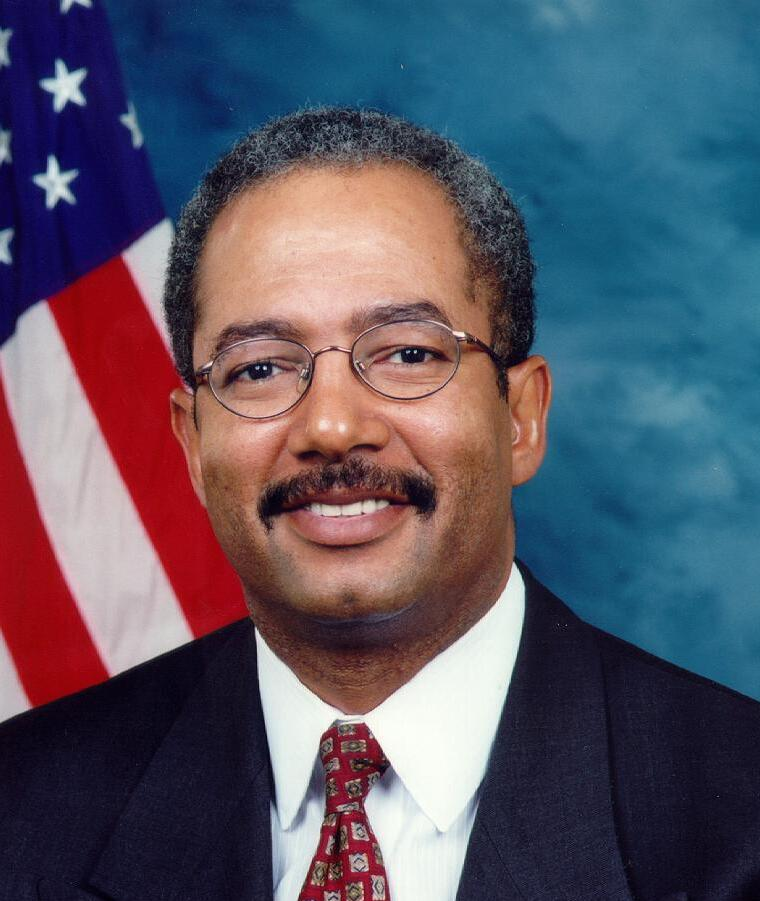

Nominee	Chaka Fattah	Larry Murphy
Party	Democratic	Republican
Popular vote	168,887	23,047
Percentage	87.99%	12.01%
U.S. Representative before election
Chaka Fattah
Democratic
Elected U.S. Representative
Chaka Fattah
Democratic

=== Democratic primary ===
==== Candidates ====
===== Nominee =====
- Chaka Fattah, incumbent U.S. Representative

==== Primary results ====
Democratic primary results
Party	Candidate	Votes	%
Democratic	Chaka Fattah (incumbent)	52,928	100.00
Total votes		52,928	100.00

=== Republican primary ===
==== Candidates ====
===== Nominee =====
- Larry G. Murphy

==== Primary results ====
Republican primary results
Party	Candidate	Votes	%
Republican	Larry G. Murphy	4,776	100.00
Total votes		4,776	100.00

=== General election ===
Pennsylvania's 2nd congressional district, 1996
Party	Candidate	Votes	%
Democratic	Chaka Fattah (incumbent)	168,887	87.99
Republican	Larry G. Murphy	23,047	12.01
Write-in		3	0.00
Total votes		191,937	100.00
Democratic hold			

==== By county ====
County	Chaka Fattah Democratic		Larry Murphy Republican		Margin		Total votes cast
County	#	%	#	%	#	%	Total votes cast
Delaware	8,063	68.05%	3,785	31.95%	4,278	36.10%	11,848
Philadelphia	160,825	89.31%	19,256	10.69%	141,569	78.62%	180,081
Totals	168,888	88.00%	23,041	12.00%	145,847	75.99%	191,929

== District 3 ==
1996 Pennsylvania's 3rd congressional district election
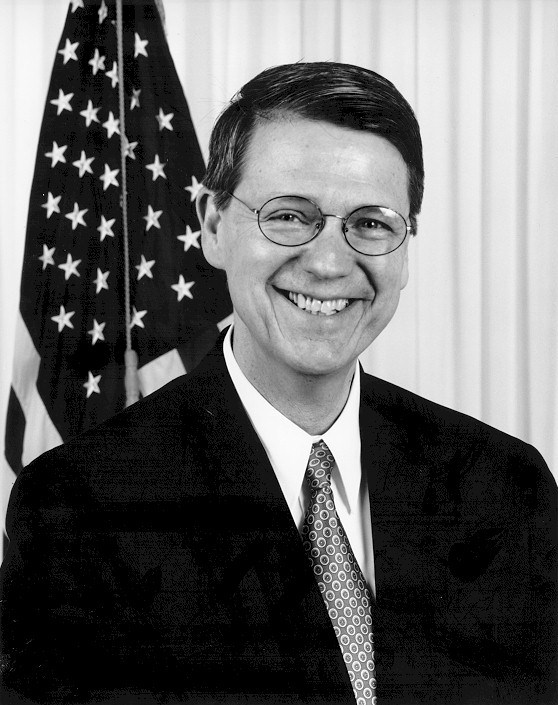

Nominee	Robert Borski	Joseph McColgan
Party	Democratic	Republican
Popular vote	121,120	54,681
Percentage	68.90%	31.10%
U.S. Representative before election
Robert Borski
Democratic
Elected U.S. Representative
Robert Borski
Democratic

=== Democratic primary ===
==== Candidates ====
===== Nominee =====
- Robert Borski, incumbent U.S. Representative

===== Eliminated in primary =====
- John R. Kates

==== Primary results ====
Democratic primary results
Party	Candidate	Votes	%
Democratic	Robert Borski (incumbent)	26,211	90.70
Democratic	John R. Kates	2,687	9.30
Total votes		28,898	100.00

=== Republican primary ===
==== Candidates ====
===== Nominee =====
- Joseph M. McColgan

==== Primary results ====
Republican primary results
Party	Candidate	Votes	%
Republican	Joseph M. McColgan	11,718	100.00
Total votes		11,718	100.00

=== General election ===
Pennsylvania's 3rd congressional district, 1996
Party	Candidate	Votes	%
Democratic	Robert Borski (incumbent)	121,120	68.90
Republican	Joseph M. McColgan	54,681	31.10
Total votes		175,801	100.00
Democratic hold			

==== By county ====
County	Robert Borski Democratic		Joseph McColgan Republican		Margin		Total votes cast
County	#	%	#	%	#	%	Total votes cast
Philadelphia	121,120	68.90%	54,681	31.10%	66,439	37.80%	175,801
Totals	121,120	68.90%	54,681	31.10%	66,439	37.80%	175,801

== District 4 ==
1996 Pennsylvania's 4th congressional district election
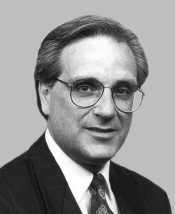

Nominee	Ron Klink	Paul Adametz
Party	Democratic	Republican
Popular vote	142,621	79,448
Percentage	64.20%	35.76%
U.S. Representative before election
Ron Klink
Democratic
Elected U.S. Representative
Ron Klink
Democratic

=== Democratic primary ===
==== Candidates ====
===== Nominee =====
- Ron Klink, incumbent U.S. Representative

==== Primary results ====
Democratic primary results
Party	Candidate	Votes	%
Democratic	Ron Klink (incumbent)	52,047	100.00
Total votes		52,047	100.00

=== Republican primary ===
==== Candidates ====
===== Nominee =====
- Paul T. Adametz

==== Primary results ====
Republican primary results
Party	Candidate	Votes	%
Republican	Paul T. Adametz	23,896	100.00
Total votes		23,896	100.00

=== General election ===
Pennsylvania's 4th congressional district, 1996
Party	Candidate	Votes	%
Democratic	Ron Klink (incumbent)	142,621	64.20
Republican	Paul T. Adametz	79,448	35.76
Write-in		98	0.04
Total votes		222,167	100.00
Democratic hold			

==== By county ====
County	Ron Klink Democratic		Paul Adametz Republican		Write-in		Margin		Total votes cast
County	#	%	#	%	#	%	#	%	Total votes cast
Allegheny	19,282	59.29%	13,237	40.71%	0	0.00%	6,045	18.58%	32,519
Beaver	50,953	69.38%	22,398	30.50%	85	0.12%	28,555	38.88%	73,436
Butler	9,643	46.81%	10,958	53.19%	0	0.00%	–1,315	–6.38%	20,601
Lawrence	25,629	71.51%	10,211	28.49%	0	0.00%	15,418	43.02%	35,840
Westmoreland	36,765	61.78%	22,740	38.22%	0	0.00%	14,025	23.56%	59,505
Totals	142,272	64.12%	79,544	35.85%	85	0.04%	62,728	28.27%	221,901

== District 5 ==
1996 Pennsylvania's 5th congressional district election
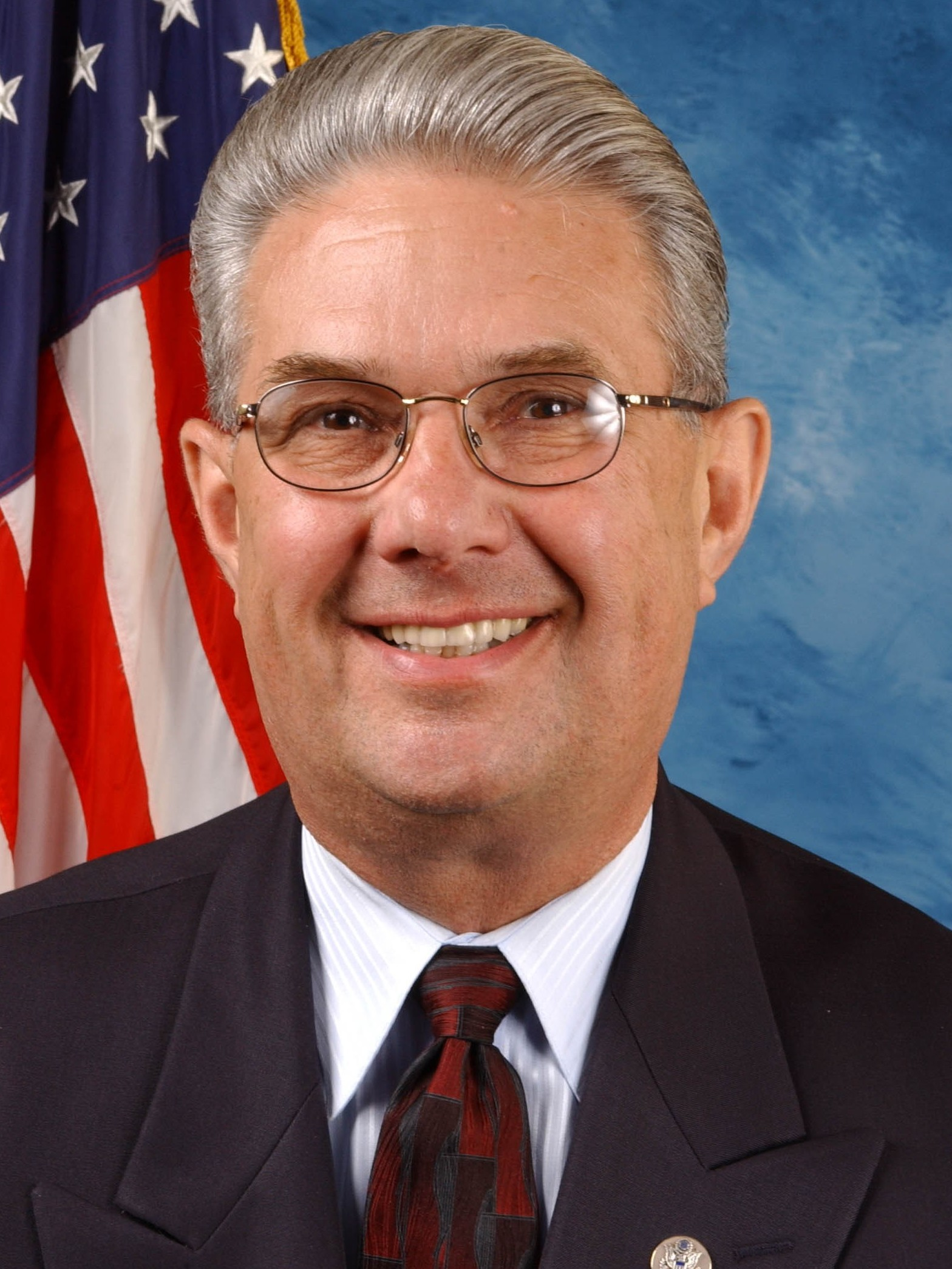

Nominee	John Peterson	Ruth Rudy
Party	Republican	Democratic
Popular vote	116,303	76,627
Percentage	60.26%	39.70%
U.S. Representative before election
William Clinger
Republican
Elected U.S. Representative
John Peterson
Republican

Incumbent U.S. Representative William Clinger retired. State Senator John Peterson held the seat for the Republicans.

=== Democratic primary ===
==== Candidates ====
===== Nominee =====
- Ruth Rudy, member of the Pennsylvania House of Representatives (1983–present)

==== Primary results ====
Democratic primary results
Party	Candidate	Votes	%
Democratic	Ruth Rudy	23,938	100.00
Total votes		23,938	100.00

=== Republican primary ===
==== Candidates ====
===== Nominee =====
- John Peterson, member of the Pennsylvania State Senate (1985–present) and Pennsylvania House of Representatives (1977–1984)

===== Eliminated in primary =====
- Patrick Conway
- Daniel S. Gordeuk
- Bob Shuster

==== Primary results ====
Republican primary results
Party	Candidate	Votes	%
Republican	John Peterson	22,000	37.74
Republican	Daniel S. Gordeuk	16,230	27.84
Republican	Bob Shuster	10,734	18.41
Republican	Patrick Conway	9,334	16.01
Total votes		58,298	100.00

=== General election ===
Pennsylvania's 5th congressional district, 1996
Party	Candidate	Votes	%
Republican	John Peterson	116,303	60.26
Democratic	Ruth Rudy	76,627	39.70
Write-in		73	0.04
Total votes		193,003	100.00
Republican hold			

==== By county ====
County	John Peterson Republican		Ruth Rudy Democratic		Write-in		Margin		Total votes cast
County	#	%	#	%	#	%	#	%	Total votes cast
Armstrong	193	72.28%	74	27.72%	0	0.00%	119	44.56%	267
Cameron	1,418	64.08%	795	35.92%	0	0.00%	623	28.16%	2,213
Centre	19,987	50.00%	19,990	50.00%	0	0.00%	–3	–0.00%	39,977
Clarion	8,913	62.48%	5,353	37.52%	0	0.00%	3,560	24.96%	14,266
Clearfield	13	100.00%	0	0.00%	0	0.00%	13	100.00%	13
Clinton	5,187	47.54%	5,723	52.46%	0	0.00%	–536	–4.92%	10,910
Crawford	5,340	73.71%	1,905	26.29%	0	0.00%	3,435	47.42%	7,245
Elk	7,236	56.35%	5,593	43.55%	13	0.10%	1,643	12.80%	12,842
Forest	1,448	66.18%	740	33.82%	0	0.00%	708	32.36%	2,188
Jefferson	10,229	63.50%	5,880	36.50%	0	0.00%	4,349	27.00%	16,109
Lycoming	3,709	69.54%	1,625	30.46%	0	0.00%	2,084	39.08%	5,334
McKean	9,054	65.16%	4,841	34.84%	1	0.01%	4,213	30.32%	13,896
Potter	4,650	69.82%	2,008	30.15%	2	0.03%	2,642	39.67%	6,660
Tioga	9,292	66.27%	4,730	33.73%	0	0.00%	4,562	32.54%	14,022
Union	7,367	64.03%	4,139	35.97%	0	0.00%	3,228	28.06%	11,506
Venango	11,866	61.75%	7,349	38.24%	2	0.01%	4,517	23.51%	19,217
Warren	10,390	63.84%	5,878	36.12%	7	0.04%	4,512	27.72%	16,275
Totals	116,292	60.27%	76,623	39.71%	25	0.01%	39,669	20.56%	192,940

== District 6 ==
1996 Pennsylvania's 6th congressional district election
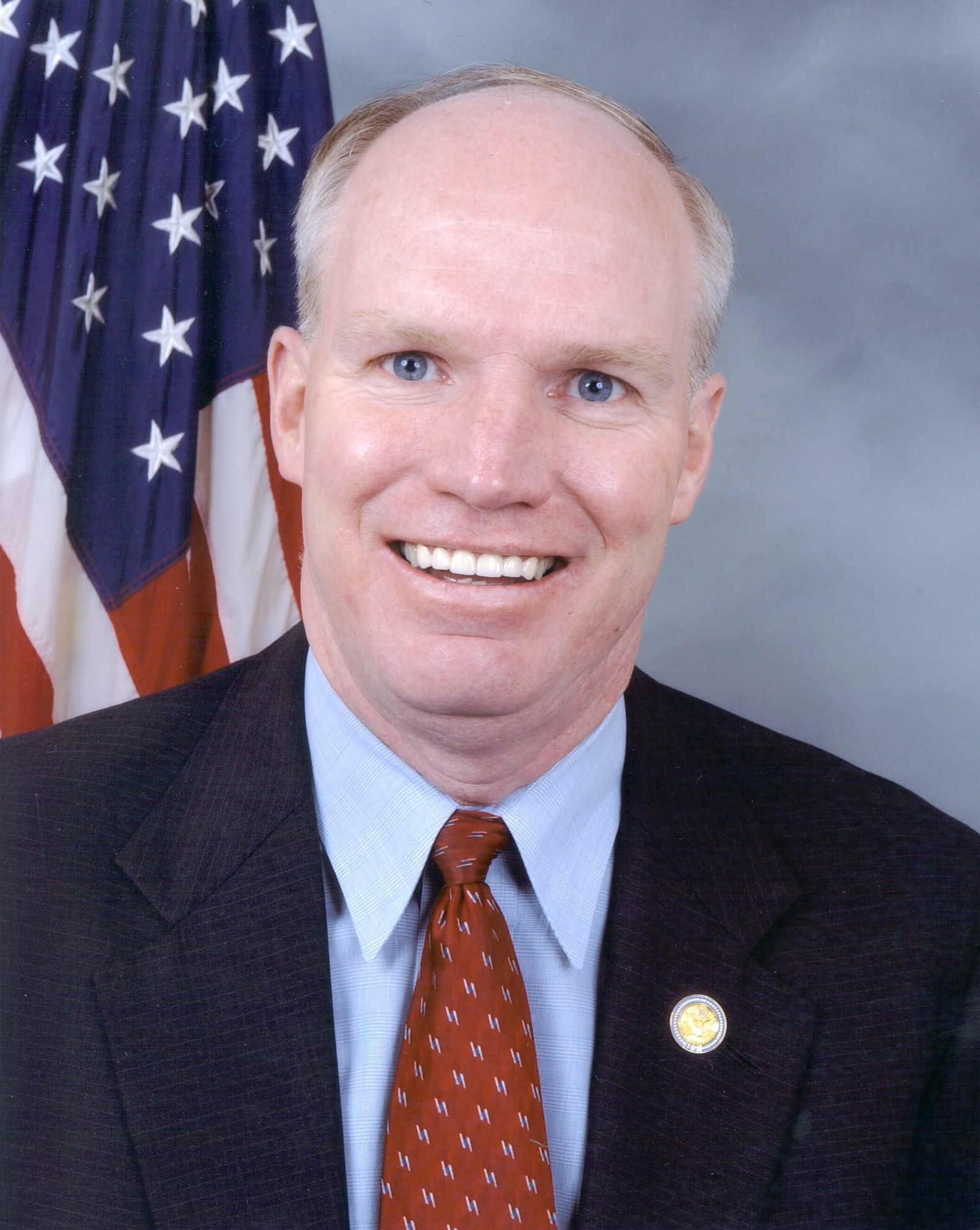

Nominee	Tim Holden	Christian Leinbach
Party	Democratic	Republican
Popular vote	115,193	80,061
Percentage	58.55%	40.70%
U.S. Representative before election
Tim Holden
Democratic
Elected U.S. Representative
Tim Holden
Democratic

=== Democratic primary ===
==== Candidates ====
===== Nominee =====
- Tim Holden, incumbent U.S. Representative

==== Primary results ====
Democratic primary results
Party	Candidate	Votes	%
Democratic	Tim Holden (incumbent)	21,829	100.00
Total votes		21,829	100.00

=== Republican primary ===
==== Candidates ====
===== Nominee =====
- Christian Y. Leinbach

===== Eliminated in primary =====
- Tom Kopel
- Frederick C. Levering
- Steve Trautwein

==== Primary results ====
Republican primary results
Party	Candidate	Votes	%
Republican	Christian Y. Leinbach	11,649	40.22
Republican	Frederick C. Levering	6,732	23.24
Republican	Steve Trautwein	6,327	21.84
Republican	Tom Kopel	4,256	14.69
Total votes		28,964	100.00

=== General election ===
Pennsylvania's 6th congressional district, 1996
Party	Candidate	Votes	%
Democratic	Tim Holden (incumbent)	115,193	58.55
Republican	Christian Y. Leinbach	80,061	40.70
Natural Law	Thomas E. List	1,475	0.75
Total votes		196,729	100.00
Democratic hold			

==== By county ====
County	Tim Holden Democratic		Christian Leinbach Republican		Thomas List Natural Law		Write-in		Margin		Total votes cast
County	#	%	#	%	#	%	#	%	#	%	Total votes cast
Berks	65,333	54.92%	52,730	44.32%	863	0.73%	41	0.03%	12,603	10.60%	118,967
Montgomery	3,840	57.42%	2,822	42.19%	26	0.39%	0	0.00%	1,018	15.23%	6,688
Northumberland	7,356	49.99%	7,242	49.21%	118	0.80%	0	0.00%	114	0.78%	14,716
Schuylkill	38,673	68.56%	17,267	30.61%	468	0.83%	0	0.00%	21,406	37.95%	56,408
Totals	115,202	58.54%	80,061	40.69%	1,475	0.75%	41	0.02%	35,141	17.86%	196,779

== District 7 ==
1996 Pennsylvania's 7th congressional district election
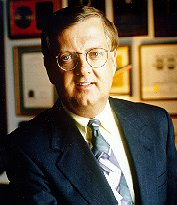

Nominee	Curt Weldon	John Innelli
Party	Republican	Democratic
Popular vote	165,087	79,875
Percentage	66.93%	32.38%
U.S. Representative before election
Curt Weldon
Republican
Elected U.S. Representative
Curt Weldon
Republican

=== Democratic primary ===
==== Candidates ====
===== Nominee =====
- John F. Innelli

==== Primary results ====
Democratic primary results
Party	Candidate	Votes	%
Democratic	John F. Innelli	12,620	100.00
Total votes		12,620	100.00

=== Republican primary ===
==== Candidates ====
===== Nominee =====
- Curt Weldon, incumbent U.S. Representative

===== Eliminated in primary =====
- Bob McMonagle

==== Primary results ====
Republican primary results
Party	Candidate	Votes	%
Republican	Curt Weldon (incumbent)	49,999	83.50
Republican	Bob McMonagle	9,882	16.50
Total votes		59,881	100.00

=== General election ===
Pennsylvania's 7th congressional district, 1996
Party	Candidate	Votes	%
Republican	Curt Weldon (incumbent)	165,087	66.93
Democratic	John F. Innelli	79,875	32.38
Natural Law	John Pronchik	1,688	0.68
Write-in		16	0.01
Total votes		246,666	100.00
Republican hold			

==== By county ====
County	Curt Weldon Republican		John Innelli Democratic		John Pronchik Natural Law		Write-in		Margin		Total votes cast
County	#	%	#	%	#	%	#	%	#	%	Total votes cast
Chester	31,290	70.08%	12,661	28.36%	663	1.48%	34	0.08%	18,629	41.72%	44,648
Delaware	125,659	66.50%	62,351	33.00%	958	0.51%	0	0.00%	63,308	33.50%	188,968
Montgomery	8,113	62.33%	4,838	37.17%	66	0.51%	0	0.00%	3,275	25.16%	13,017
Totals	165,062	66.93%	79,850	32.38%	1,687	0.68%	34	0.01%	85,212	34.55%	246,663

== District 8 ==
1996 Pennsylvania's 8th congressional district election
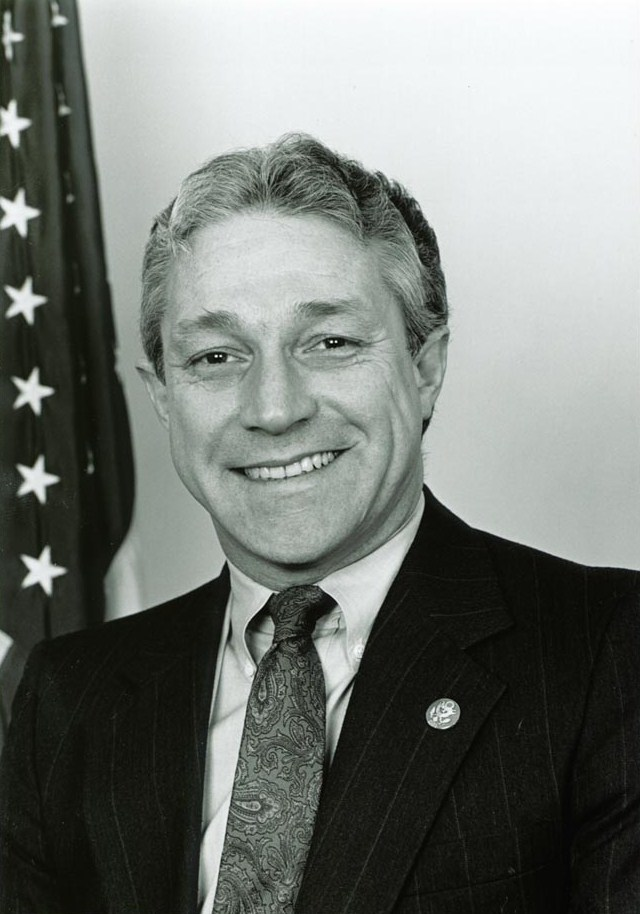

Nominee	Jim Greenwood	John Murray
Party	Republican	Democratic
Popular vote	133,749	79,856
Percentage	59.10%	35.28%
U.S. Representative before election
Jim Greenwood
Republican
Elected U.S. Representative
Jim Greenwood
Republican

=== Democratic primary ===
==== Candidates ====
===== Nominee =====
- John P. Murray

==== Primary results ====
Democratic primary results
Party	Candidate	Votes	%
Democratic	John P. Murray	11,304	100.00
Total votes		11,304	100.00

=== Republican primary ===
==== Candidates ====
===== Nominee =====
- Jim Greenwood, incumbent U.S. Representative

===== Eliminated in primary =====
- Tom Lingenfelter

==== Primary results ====
Republican primary results
Party	Candidate	Votes	%
Republican	Jim Greenwood (incumbent)	18,376	60.32
Republican	Tom Lingenfelter	12,088	39.68
Total votes		30,464	100.00

=== General election ===
Pennsylvania's 8th congressional district, 1996
Party	Candidate	Votes	%
Republican	Jim Greenwood (incumbent)	133,749	59.10
Democratic	John P. Murray	79,856	35.28
Libertarian	Richard J. Piotrowski	6,991	3.09
Constitution	David A. Booth	5,714	2.52
Write-in		12	0.01
Total votes		226,322	100.00
Republican hold			

==== By county ====
County	Jim Greenwood Republican		John Murray Democratic		Richard Piotrowski Libertarian		David Booth Constitution		Margin		Total votes cast
County	#	%	#	%	#	%	#	%	#	%	Total votes cast
Bucks	127,479	58.77%	77,181	35.58%	6,712	3.09%	5,549	2.56%	50,298	23.19%	216,921
Montgomery	6,270	66.78%	2,675	28.49%	279	2.97%	165	1.76%	3,595	38.29%	9,389
Totals	133,749	59.10%	79,856	35.29%	6,991	3.09%	5,714	2.52%	53,893	23.81%	226,310

== District 9 ==
1996 Pennsylvania's 9th congressional district election
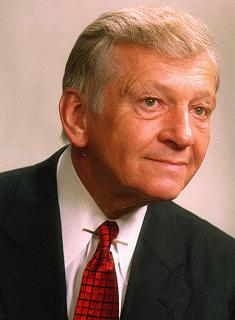

Nominee	Bud Shuster	Monte Kemmler
Party	Republican	Democratic
Popular vote	142,105	50,650
Percentage	73.70%	26.27%
U.S. Representative before election
Bud Shuster
Republican
Elected U.S. Representative
Bud Shuster
Republican

=== Democratic primary ===
==== Candidates ====
===== Nominee =====
- Monte Kemmler

==== Primary results ====
Democratic primary results
Party	Candidate	Votes	%
Democratic	Monte Kemmler	18,173	100.00
Total votes		18,173	100.00

=== Republican primary ===
==== Candidates ====
===== Nominee =====
- Bud Shuster, incumbent U.S. Representative

==== Primary results ====
Republican primary results
Party	Candidate	Votes	%
Republican	Bud Shuster (incumbent)	34,793	100.00
Total votes		34,793	100.00

=== General election ===
Pennsylvania's 9th congressional district, 1996
Party	Candidate	Votes	%
Republican	Bud Shuster (incumbent)	142,105	73.70
Democratic	Monte Kemmler	50,650	26.27
Write-in		67	0.03
Total votes		192,822	100.00
Republican hold			

==== By county ====
County	Bud Shuster Republican		Monte Kemmler Democratic		Write-in		Margin		Total votes cast
County	#	%	#	%	#	%	#	%	Total votes cast
Bedford	13,995	77.68%	4,021	22.32%	0	0.00%	9,974	55.36%	18,016
Blair	32,065	78.99%	8,455	20.83%	72	0.18%	23,610	58.16%	40,592
Centre	4,237	73.53%	1,525	26.47%	0	0.00%	2,712	47.06%	5,762
Clearfield	20,245	71.10%	8,210	28.83%	20	0.07%	12,035	42.27%	28,475
Franklin	32,484	73.87%	11,421	25.97%	72	0.16%	21,063	47.90%	43,977
Fulton	3,520	73.06%	1,298	26.94%	0	0.00%	2,222	46.12%	4,818
Huntingdon	9,836	68.23%	4,580	31.77%	0	0.00%	5,256	36.46%	14,416
Juniata	5,479	69.50%	2,404	30.50%	0	0.00%	3,075	39.00%	7,883
Mifflin	8,362	63.34%	4,840	36.66%	0	0.00%	3,522	26.68%	13,202
Perry	3,233	74.39%	1,111	25.56%	2	0.05%	2,122	48.83%	4,346
Snyder	8,559	75.58%	2,765	24.42%	0	0.00%	5,794	51.16%	11,324
Totals	142,015	73.66%	50,630	26.26%	166	0.09%	91,385	47.40%	192,811

== District 10 ==
1996 Pennsylvania's 10th congressional district election
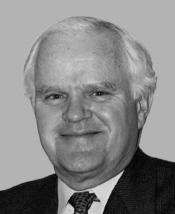

Nominee	Joseph M. McDade	Joe Cullen
Party	Republican	Democratic
Popular vote	124,670	75,536
Percentage	59.78%	36.22%
U.S. Representative before election
Joseph M. McDade
Republican
Elected U.S. Representative
Joseph M. McDade
Republican

=== Democratic primary ===
==== Candidates ====
===== Nominee =====
- Joe Cullen

===== Eliminated in primary =====
- Daniel J. Schreffler

==== Primary results ====
Democratic primary results
Party	Candidate	Votes	%
Democratic	Joe Cullen	15,291	67.24
Democratic	Daniel J. Schreffler	7,450	32.76
Total votes		22,741	100.00

=== Republican primary ===
==== Candidates ====
===== Nominee =====
- Joseph M. McDade, incumbent U.S. Representative

===== Eliminated in primary =====
- Errol Flynn

==== Primary results ====
Republican primary results
Party	Candidate	Votes	%
Republican	Joseph M. McDade (incumbent)	17,155	53.28
Republican	Errol Flynn	15,043	46.72
Total votes		32,198	100.00

=== General election ===
Pennsylvania's 10th congressional district, 1996
Party	Candidate	Votes	%
Republican	Joseph M. McDade (incumbent)	124,670	59.78
Democratic	Joe Cullen	75,536	36.22
Reform	Thomas J. McLaughlin	8,311	3.99
Write-in		23	0.01
Total votes		208,540	100.00
Republican hold			

==== By county ====
County	Joseph M. McDade Republican		Joe Cullen Democratic		Thomas McLaughlin Reform		Write-in		Margin		Total votes cast
County	#	%	#	%	#	%	#	%	#	%	Total votes cast
Bradford	13,358	64.48%	6,180	29.83%	1,170	5.65%	10	0.05%	7,178	34.65%	20,718
Lackawanna	49,738	60.65%	30,505	37.19%	1,771	2.16%	0	0.00%	19,233	23.46%	82,014
Lycoming	17,970	56.83%	12,544	39.67%	1,102	3.49%	2	0.01%	5,426	17.16%	31,618
Monroe	8,111	49.40%	7,315	44.55%	992	6.04%	0	0.00%	796	4.85%	16,418
Pike	7,443	54.41%	5,418	39.61%	819	5.99%	0	0.00%	2,025	14.80%	13,680
Sullivan	1,582	56.76%	1,061	38.07%	144	5.17%	0	0.00%	521	18.69%	2,787
Susquehanna	10,156	65.74%	4,369	28.28%	924	5.98%	0	0.00%	5,787	37.46%	15,449
Wayne	9,499	61.26%	5,177	33.38%	829	5.35%	2	0.01%	4,322	27.88%	15,507
Wyoming	6,803	65.97%	2,948	28.59%	554	5.37%	8	0.08%	3,855	37.38%	10,313
Totals	124,660	59.79%	75,517	36.22%	8,305	3.98%	22	0.01%	49,143	23.57%	208,504

== District 11 ==
1996 Pennsylvania's 11th congressional district election
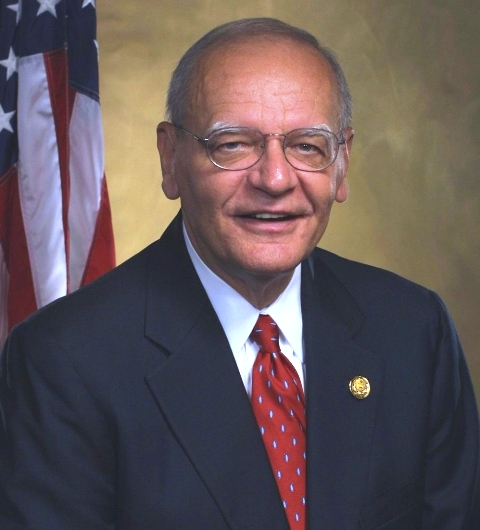

Nominee	Paul Kanjorski	Stephen Urban
Party	Democratic	Republican
Popular vote	128,258	60,339
Percentage	68.00%	31.99%
U.S. Representative before election
Paul Kanjorski
Democratic
Elected U.S. Representative
Paul Kanjorski
Democratic

=== Democratic primary ===
==== Candidates ====
===== Nominee =====
- Paul Kanjorski, incumbent U.S. Representative

==== Primary results ====
Democratic primary results
Party	Candidate	Votes	%
Democratic	Paul Kanjorski (incumbent)	32,110	100.00
Total votes		32,110	100.00

=== Republican primary ===
==== Candidates ====
===== Nominee =====
- Stephen Urban, former military officer

==== Primary results ====
Republican primary results
Party	Candidate	Votes	%
Republican	Stephen Urban	16,942	100.00
Total votes		16,942	100.00

=== General election ===
Pennsylvania's 11th congressional district, 1996
Party	Candidate	Votes	%
Democratic	Paul Kanjorski (incumbent)	128,258	68.00
Republican	Stephen Urban	60,339	31.99
Write-in		12	0.01
Total votes		188,609	100.00
Democratic hold			

==== By county ====
County	Paul Kanjorski Democratic		Stephen Urban Republican		Write-in		Margin		Total votes cast
County	#	%	#	%	#	%	#	%	Total votes cast
Carbon	12,947	70.53%	5,409	29.47%	0	0.00%	7,538	41.06%	18,356
Columbia	12,743	63.94%	7,178	36.02%	9	0.05%	5,565	27.92%	19,930
Luzerne	75,404	70.28%	31,889	29.72%	0	0.00%	43,515	40.56%	107,293
Monroe	11,218	56.26%	8,722	43.74%	0	0.00%	2,496	12.52%	19,940
Montour	3,662	62.91%	2,159	37.09%	0	0.00%	1,503	25.82%	5,821
Northumberland	11,254	72.08%	4,359	27.92%	0	0.00%	6,895	44.16%	15,613
Totals	127,228	68.05%	59,716	31.94%	9	0.00%	67,512	36.11%	186,953

== District 12 ==
1996 Pennsylvania's 12th congressional district election
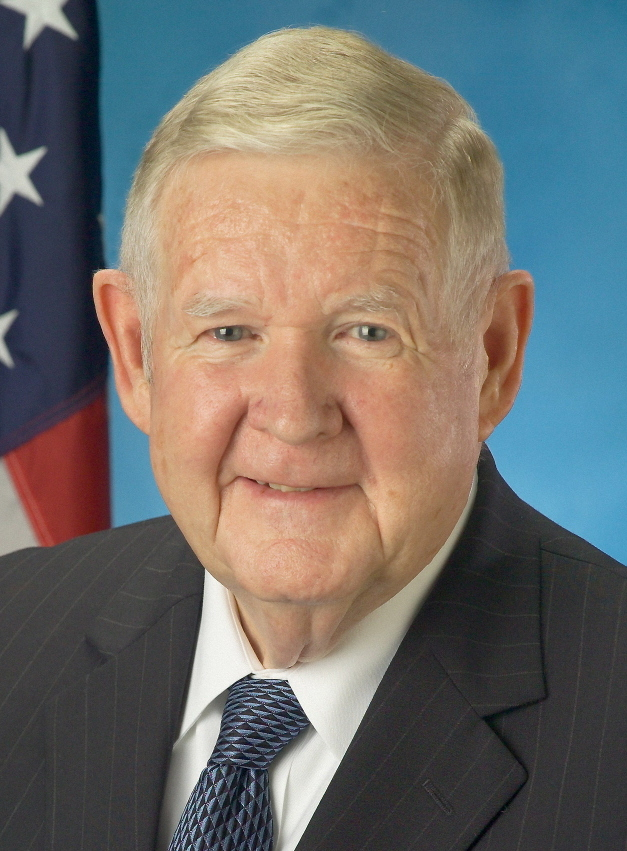

Nominee	John Murtha	Bill Choby
Party	Democratic	Republican
Popular vote	136,815	58,643
Percentage	69.99%	30.00%
U.S. Representative before election
John Murtha
Democratic
Elected U.S. Representative
John Murtha
Democratic

=== Democratic primary ===
==== Candidates ====
===== Nominee =====
- John Murtha, incumbent U.S. Representative

==== Primary results ====
Democratic primary results
Party	Candidate	Votes	%
Democratic	John Murtha (incumbent)	49,630	100.00
Total votes		49,630	100.00

=== Republican primary ===
==== Candidates ====
===== Nominee =====
- Bill Choby

===== Eliminated in primary =====
- Michael A. Buben

==== Primary results ====
Republican primary results
Party	Candidate	Votes	%
Republican	Bill Choby	16,013	52.46
Republican	Michael A. Buben	14,509	47.54
Total votes		30,522	100.00

=== General election ===
Pennsylvania's 12th congressional district, 1996
Party	Candidate	Votes	%
Democratic	John Murtha (incumbent)	136,815	69.99
Republican	Bill Choby	58,643	30.00
Write-in		23	0.01
Total votes		195,481	100.00
Democratic hold			

==== By county ====
County	John Murtha Democratic		Bill Choby Republican		Write-in		Margin		Total votes cast
County	#	%	#	%	#	%	#	%	Total votes cast
Armstrong	15,130	60.59%	9,840	39.41%	0	0.00%	5,290	21.18%	24,970
Cambria	46,852	80.04%	11,684	19.96%	0	0.00%	35,168	60.08%	58,536
Clarion	286	66.36%	145	33.64%	0	0.00%	141	32.72%	431
Fayette	9,949	68.61%	4,552	31.39%	0	0.00%	5,397	37.22%	14,501
Indiana	19,957	65.92%	10,319	34.08%	0	0.00%	9,638	31.84%	30,276
Somerset	20,718	66.11%	10,597	33.82%	22	0.07%	10,121	32.29%	31,337
Westmoreland	23,940	67.60%	11,475	32.40%	0	0.00%	12,465	35.20%	35,415
Totals	136,832	70.00%	58,612	29.99%	22	0.01%	78,220	40.02%	195,466

== District 13 ==
1996 Pennsylvania's 13th congressional district election
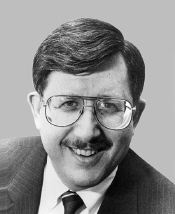

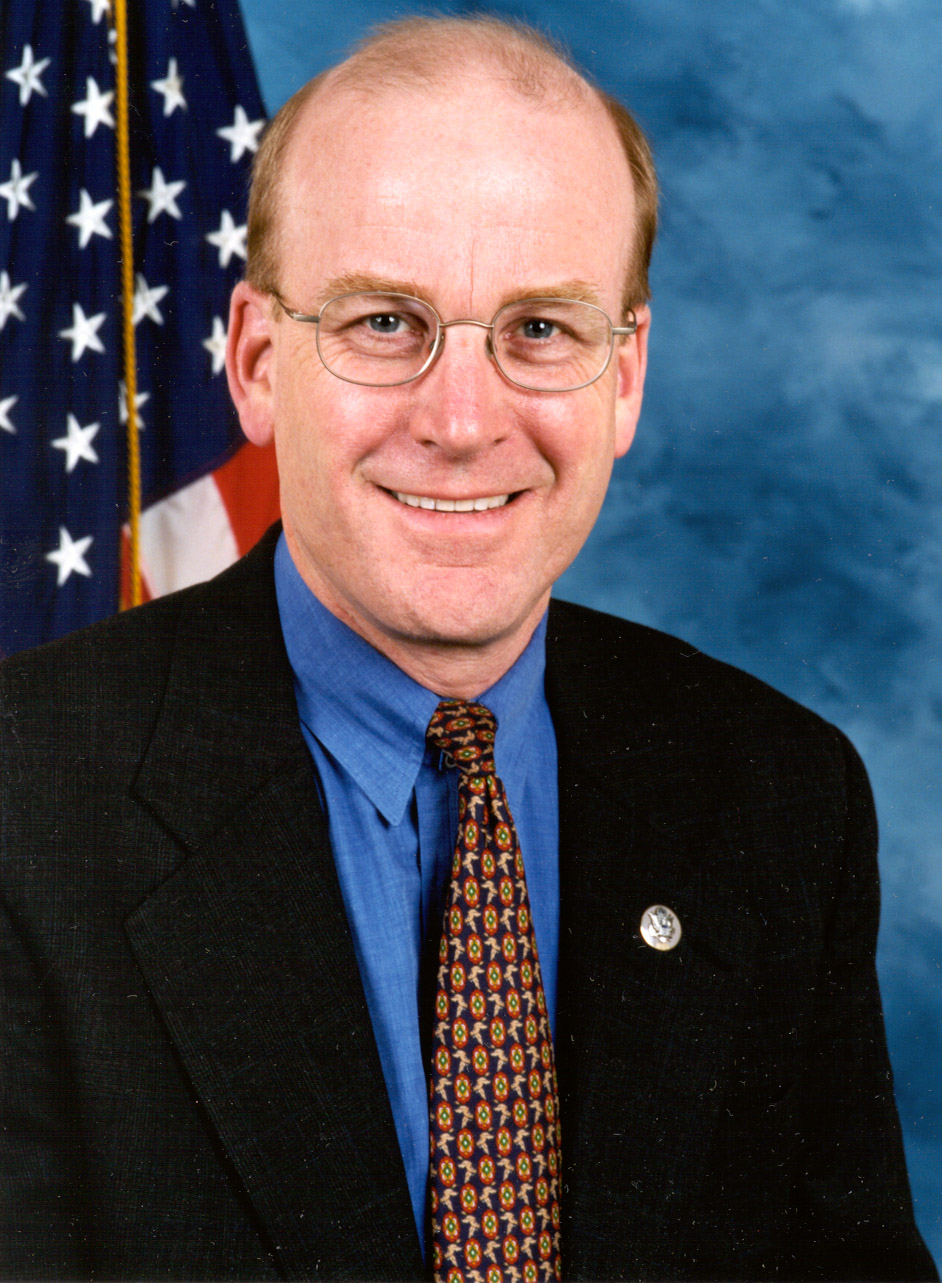
Nominee	Jon D. Fox	Joe Hoeffel
Party	Republican	Democratic
Popular vote	120,304	120,220
Percentage	48.91%	48.87%
U.S. Representative before election
Jon D. Fox
Republican
Elected U.S. Representative
Jon D. Fox
Republican

Incumbent U.S. Representative Jon D. Fox defeated Joe Hoeffel by an 84-vote margin.

=== Democratic primary ===
==== Candidates ====
===== Nominee =====
- Joe Hoeffel, member of the Montgomery County Board of Commissioners

==== Primary results ====
Democratic primary results
Party	Candidate	Votes	%
Democratic	Joe Hoeffel	13,710	100.00
Total votes		13,710	100.00

=== Republican primary ===
==== Candidates ====
===== Nominee =====
- Jon D. Fox, incumbent U.S. Representative

==== Primary results ====
Republican primary results
Party	Candidate	Votes	%
Republican	Jon D. Fox (incumbent)	30,852	100.00
Total votes		30,852	100.00

=== General election ===
Pennsylvania's 13th congressional district, 1996
Party	Candidate	Votes	%
Republican	Jon D. Fox (incumbent)	120,304	48.91
Democratic	Joe Hoeffel	120,220	48.87
Libertarian	Thomas Patrick Burke	4,930	2.00
Natural Law	Bill Ryan	525	0.21
Total votes		245,979	100.00
Republican hold			

==== By county ====
County	Jon D. Fox Republican		Joe Hoeffel Democratic		Thomas Burke Libertarian		Bill Ryan Natural Law		Margin		Total votes cast
County	#	%	#	%	#	%	#	%	#	%	Total votes cast
Montgomery	120,304	48.91%	120,220	48.87%	4,930	2.00%	525	0.21%	84	0.03%	245,979
Totals	120,304	48.91%	120,220	48.87%	4,930	2.00%	525	0.21%	84	0.03%	245,979

== District 14 ==
1996 Pennsylvania's 14th congressional district election
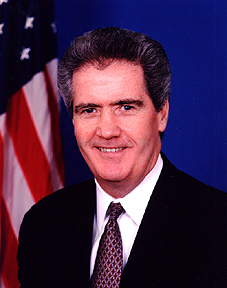

Nominee	William J. Coyne	Bill Ravotti
Party	Democratic	Republican
Popular vote	122,922	78,921
Percentage	60.68%	38.96%
U.S. Representative before election
William J. Coyne
Democratic
Elected U.S. Representative
William J. Coyne
Democratic

=== Democratic primary ===
==== Candidates ====
===== Nominee =====
- William J. Coyne, incumbent U.S. Representative

===== Eliminated in primary =====
- Dan Cohen

==== Primary results ====
Democratic primary results
Party	Candidate	Votes	%
Democratic	William J. Coyne (incumbent)	47,334	66.02
Democratic	Dan Cohen	24,364	33.98
Total votes		71,698	100.00

=== Republican primary ===
==== Candidates ====
===== Nominee =====
- Bill Ravotti

==== Primary results ====
Republican primary results
Party	Candidate	Votes	%
Republican	Bill Ravotti	14,405	100.00
Total votes		14,405	100.00

=== General election ===
Pennsylvania's 14th congressional district, 1996
Party	Candidate	Votes	%
Democratic	William J. Coyne (incumbent)	122,922	60.68
Republican	Bill Ravotti	78,921	38.96
Socialist Equality	Paul Scherrer	713	0.35
Write-in		22	0.01
Total votes		202,578	100.00
Democratic hold			

==== By county ====
County	William J. Coyne Democratic		Bill Ravotti Republican		Paul Scherrer Socialist Equality		Margin		Total votes cast
County	#	%	#	%	#	%	#	%	Total votes cast
Allegheny	122,922	60.69%	78,921	38.96%	713	0.35%	44,001	21.72%	202,556
Totals	122,922	60.69%	78,921	38.96%	713	0.35%	44,001	21.72%	202,556

== District 15 ==
1996 Pennsylvania's 15th congressional district election
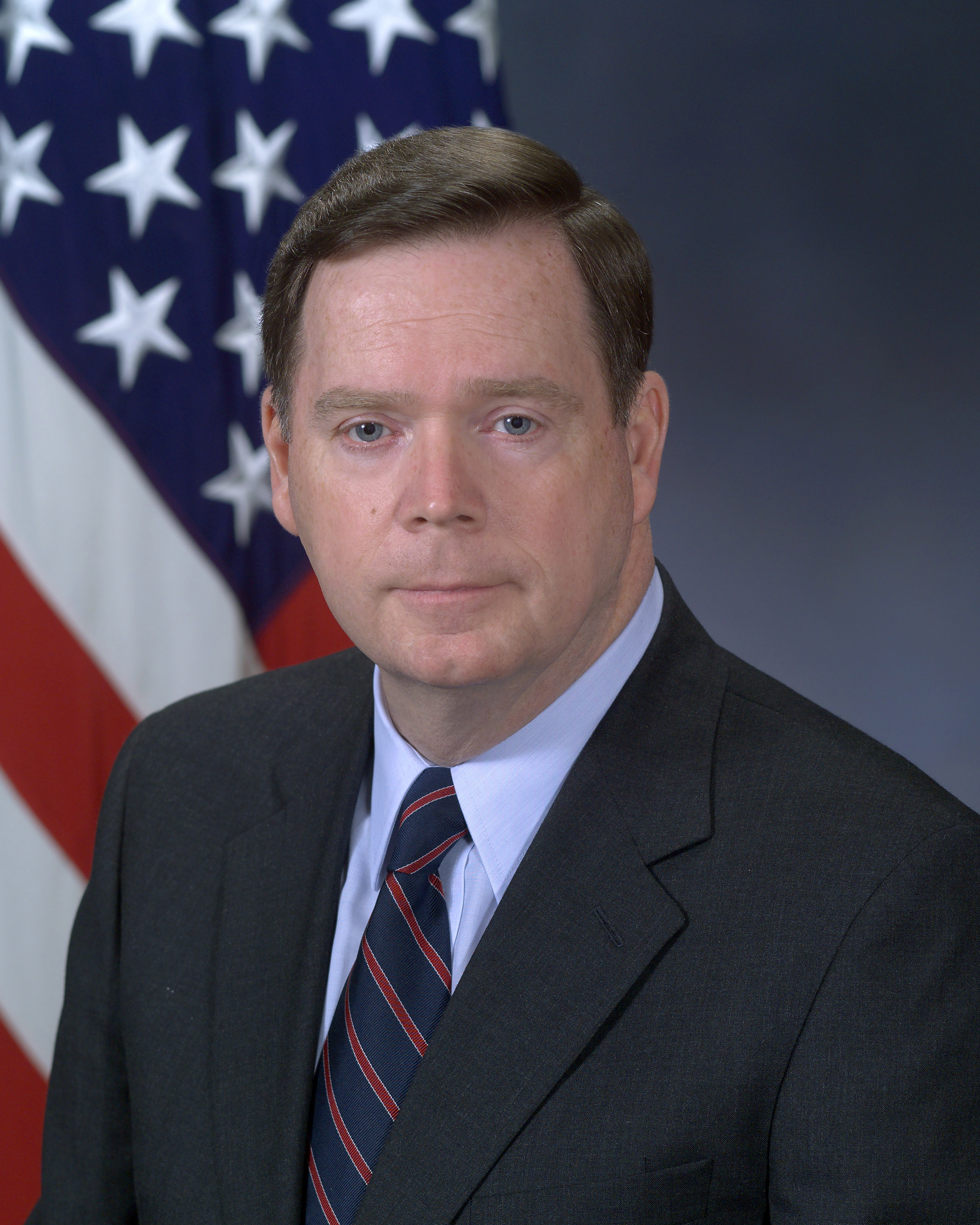

Nominee	Paul McHale	Bob Kilbanks
Party	Democratic	Republican
Popular vote	109,812	82,803
Percentage	54.81%	41.33%
U.S. Representative before election
Paul McHale
Democratic
Elected U.S. Representative
Paul McHale
Democratic

=== Democratic primary ===
==== Candidates ====
===== Nominee =====
- Paul McHale, incumbent U.S. Representative

==== Primary results ====
Democratic primary results
Party	Candidate	Votes	%
Democratic	Paul McHale (incumbent)	24,332	100.00
Total votes		24,332	100.00

=== Republican primary ===
==== Candidates ====
===== Nominee =====
- Bob Kilbanks

===== Eliminated in primary =====
- James Brose
- Edward G. Smith
- Ken Smith

==== Primary results ====
Republican primary results
Party	Candidate	Votes	%
Republican	Bob Kilbanks	10,499	38.59
Republican	Ken Smith	9,062	33.31
Republican	Edward G. Smith	5,568	20.47
Republican	James Brose	2,077	7.63
Total votes		27,206	100.00

=== General election ===
Pennsylvania's 15th congressional district, 1996
Party	Candidate	Votes	%
Democratic	Paul McHale (incumbent)	109,812	54.81
Republican	Bob Kilbanks	82,803	41.33
Reform	Nicholas R. Sabatine III	6,931	3.46
Natural Law	Philip E. Faust	812	0.41
Write-in		5	0.00
Total votes		200,363	100.00
Democratic hold			

==== By county ====
County	Paul McHale Democratic		Bob Kilbanks Republican		Nicholas Sabatine Reform		Philip Faust Natural Law		Write-in		Margin		Total votes cast
County	#	%	#	%	#	%	#	%	#	%	#	%	Total votes cast
Lehigh	55,799	54.56%	43,032	42.08%	3,023	2.96%	412	0.40%	5	0.00%	12,767	12.48%	102,271
Montgomery	4,131	42.05%	5,362	54.58%	315	3.21%	17	0.17%	0	0.00%	–1,231	–12.53%	9,825
Northampton	49,882	56.51%	34,409	38.98%	3,593	4.07%	383	0.43%	9	0.01%	15,473	17.53%	88,276
Totals	109,812	54.80%	82,803	41.32%	6,931	3.46%	812	0.41%	14	0.01%	27,009	13.48%	200,372

== District 16 ==
1996 Pennsylvania's 16th congressional district election
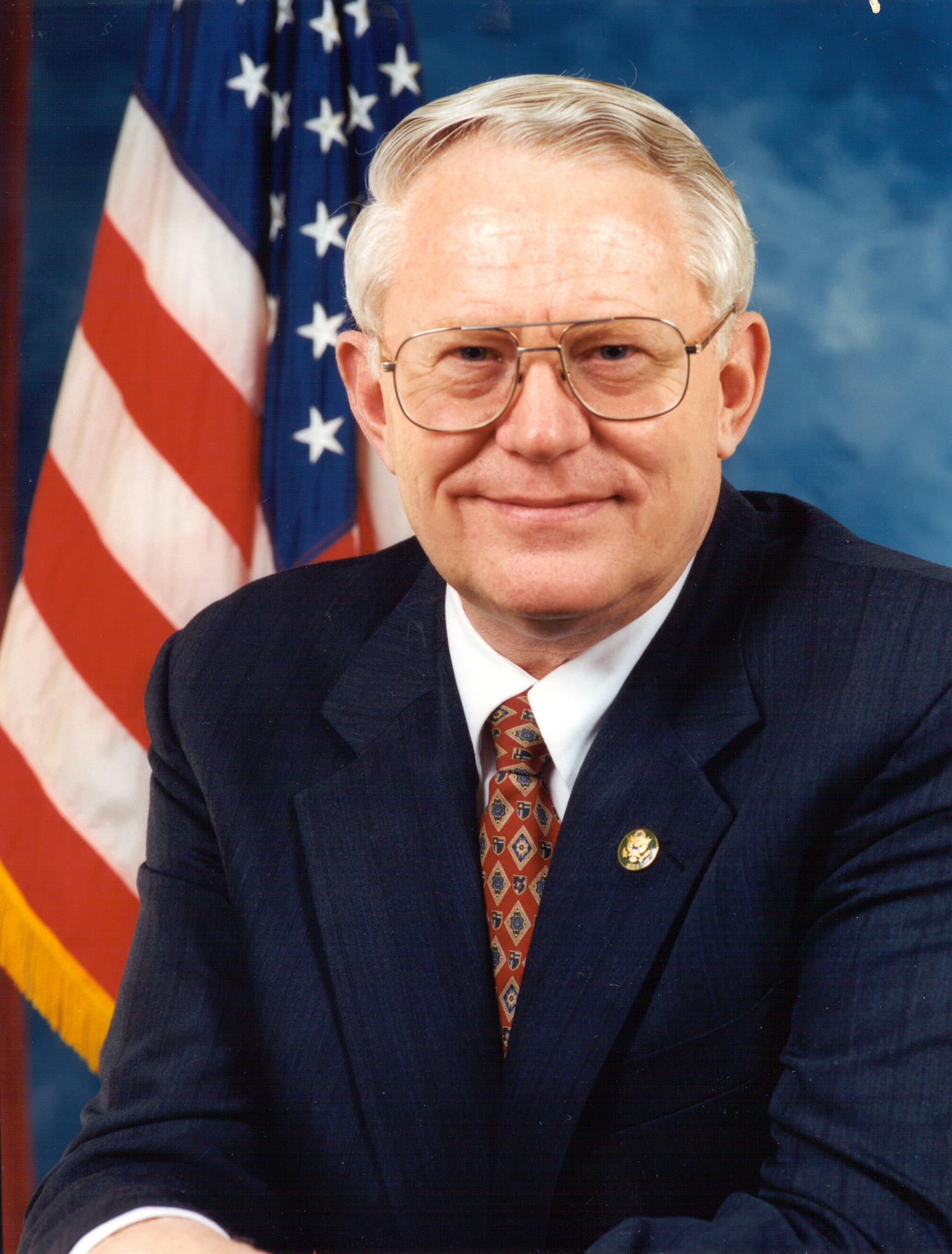

Nominee	Joe Pitts	James Blaine
Party	Republican	Democratic
Popular vote	124,511	78,598
Percentage	59.40%	37.50%
U.S. Representative before election
Bob Walker
Republican
Elected U.S. Representative
Joe Pitts
Republican

Incumbent U.S. Representative Bob Walker retired, with State Representative Joe Pitts holding the seat for the Republicans.

=== Democratic primary ===
==== Candidates ====
===== Nominee =====
- James G. Blaine

==== Primary results ====
Democratic primary results
Party	Candidate	Votes	%
Democratic	James G. Blaine	8,868	100.00
Total votes		8,868	100.00

=== Republican primary ===
==== Candidates ====
===== Nominee =====
- Joe Pitts, member of the Pennsylvania House of Representatives (1973–present)

===== Eliminated in primary =====
- Brad S. Fischer
- Stephen R. Gibble
- Karen Martynick
- Pat Sellers

==== Primary results ====
Republican primary results
Party	Candidate	Votes	%
Republican	Joe Pitts	26,515	45.18
Republican	Karen Martynick	15,314	26.09
Republican	Stephen R. Gibble	11,777	20.07
Republican	Pat Sellers	2,696	4.59
Republican	Brad S. Fischer	2,386	4.07
Total votes		58,688	100.00

=== General election ===
Pennsylvania's 16th congressional district, 1996
Party	Candidate	Votes	%
Republican	Joe Pitts	124,511	59.40
Democratic	James G. Blaine	78,598	37.50
Reform	Robert S. Yorczyk	6,485	3.09
Write-in		8	0.00
Total votes		209,602	100.00
Republican hold			

==== By county ====
County	Joe Pitts Republican		James Blaine Democratic		Robert Yorczyk Reform		Write-in		Margin		Total votes cast
County	#	%	#	%	#	%	#	%	#	%	Total votes cast
Chester	63,695	57.54%	42,837	38.70%	4,088	3.69%	68	0.06%	20,858	18.84%	110,688
Lancaster	60,802	61.44%	35,754	36.13%	2,396	2.42%	7	0.01%	25,048	25.31%	98,959
Totals	124,497	59.38%	78,591	37.49%	6,484	3.09%	75	0.04%	45,906	21.90%	209,647

== District 17 ==
1996 Pennsylvania's 17th congressional district election
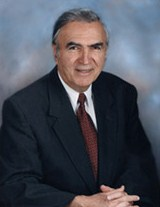

Nominee	George Gekas	Paul Kettl
Party	Republican	Democratic
Popular vote	150,678	57,911
Percentage	72.23%	27.76%
U.S. Representative before election
George Gekas
Republican
Elected U.S. Representative
George Gekas
Republican

=== Democratic primary ===
==== Candidates ====
===== Nominee =====
- Paul Kettl, former chair of psychiatry at the Pennsylvania State University College of Medicine

==== Primary results ====
Democratic primary results
Party	Candidate	Votes	%
Democratic	Paul Kettl	12,959	100.00
Total votes		12,959	100.00

=== Republican primary ===
==== Candidates ====
===== Nominee =====
- George Gekas, incumbent U.S. Representative

==== Primary results ====
Republican primary results
Party	Candidate	Votes	%
Republican	George Gekas (incumbent)	41,890	100.00
Total votes		41,890	100.00

=== General election ===
Pennsylvania's 17th congressional district, 1996
Party	Candidate	Votes	%
Republican	George Gekas (incumbent)	150,678	72.23
Democratic	Paul Kettl	57,911	27.76
Write-in		27	0.01
Total votes		208,616	100.00
Republican hold			

==== By county ====
County	George Gekas Republican		Paul Kettl Democratic		Write-in		Margin		Total votes cast
County	#	%	#	%	#	%	#	%	Total votes cast
Cumberland	16,137	75.10%	5,329	24.80%	21	0.10%	10,808	50.30%	21,487
Dauphin	63,694	70.36%	26,828	29.64%	0	0.00%	36,866	40.72%	90,522
Lancaster	36,175	74.62%	12,295	25.36%	6	0.01%	23,880	49.26%	48,476
Lebanon	26,693	69.99%	11,445	30.01%	0	0.00%	15,248	39.98%	38,138
Perry	7,979	79.84%	2,014	20.15%	1	0.01%	5,965	59.69%	9,994
Totals	150,678	72.23%	57,911	27.76%	28	0.01%	92,767	44.47%	208,617

== District 18 ==
1996 Pennsylvania's 18th congressional district election
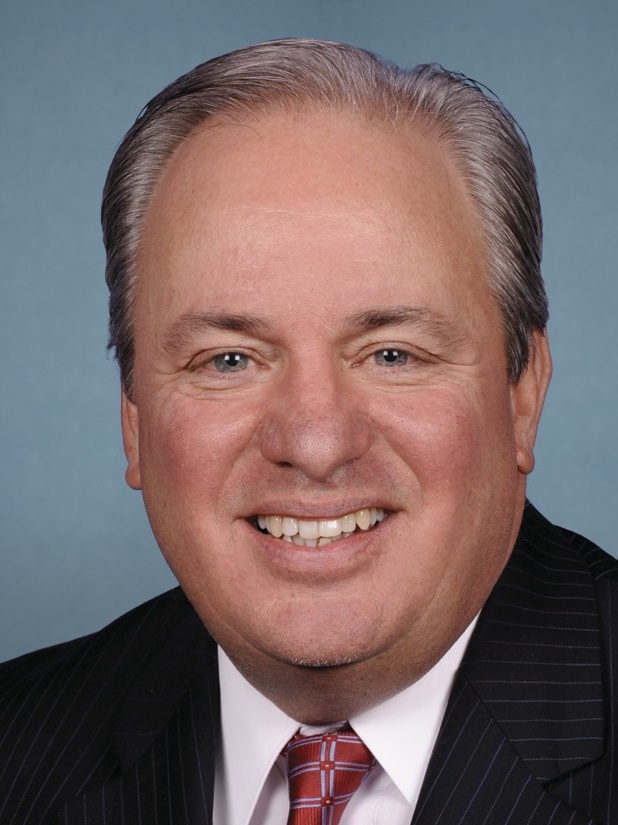

Nominee	Mike Doyle	David Fawcett
Party	Democratic	Republican
Popular vote	120,410	86,829
Percentage	56.01%	40.39%
U.S. Representative before election
Mike Doyle
Democratic
Elected U.S. Representative
Mike Doyle
Democratic

=== Democratic primary ===
==== Candidates ====
===== Nominee =====
- Mike Doyle, incumbent U.S. Representative

===== Eliminated in primary =====
- Joseph Rudolph

==== Primary results ====
Democratic primary results
Party	Candidate	Votes	%
Democratic	Mike Doyle (incumbent)	45,967	74.39
Democratic	Joseph Rudolph	15,822	25.61
Total votes		61,789	100.00

=== Republican primary ===
==== Candidates ====
===== Nominee =====
- David Fawcett

==== Primary results ====
Republican primary results
Party	Candidate	Votes	%
Republican	David Fawcett	21,704	100.00
Total votes		21,704	100.00

=== General election ===
Pennsylvania's 18th congressional district, 1996
Party	Candidate	Votes	%
Democratic	Mike Doyle (incumbent)	120,410	56.01
Republican	David Fawcett	86,829	40.39
Independent	Richard E. Caligiuri	6,859	3.19
Natural Law	Ralph Emmerich	883	0.41
Write-in		9	0.00
Total votes		214,990	100.00
Democratic hold			

==== By county ====
County	Mike Doyle Democratic		David Fawcett Republican		Richard Caligiuri Independent		Ralph Emmerich Natural Law		Write-in		Margin		Total votes cast
County	#	%	#	%	#	%	#	%	#	%	#	%	Total votes cast
Allegheny	120,410	56.01%	86,829	40.39%	6,859	3.19%	883	0.41%	9	0.00%	33,581	15.62%	214,990
Totals	120,410	56.01%	86,829	40.39%	6,859	3.19%	883	0.41%	9	0.00%	33,581	15.62%	214,990

== District 19 ==
1996 Pennsylvania's 19th congressional district election
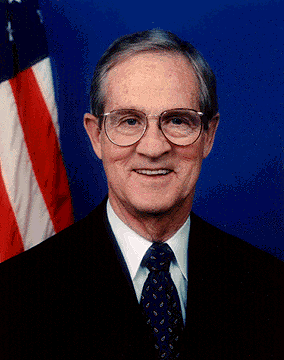

Nominee	Bill Goodling	Scott Chronister
Party	Republican	Democratic
Popular vote	130,716	74,944
Percentage	62.55%	35.86%
U.S. Representative before election
Bill Goodling
Republican
Elected U.S. Representative
Bill Goodling
Republican

=== Democratic primary ===
==== Candidates ====
===== Nominee =====
- Scott L. Chronister

==== Primary results ====
Democratic primary results
Party	Candidate	Votes	%
Democratic	Scott L. Chronister	15,992	100.00
Total votes		15,992	100.00

=== Republican primary ===
==== Candidates ====
===== Nominee =====
- Bill Goodling, incumbent U.S. Representative

===== Eliminated in primary =====
- Charlie Gerow, Republican Party strategist

==== Primary results ====
Republican primary results
Party	Candidate	Votes	%
Republican	Bill Goodling (incumbent)	24,014	54.93
Republican	Charlie Gerow	19,700	45.07
Total votes		43,714	100.00

=== General election ===
Pennsylvania's 19th congressional district, 1996
Party	Candidate	Votes	%
Republican	Bill Goodling (incumbent)	130,716	62.55
Democratic	Scott L. Chronister	74,944	35.86
Francis Worley Party	Francis Worley	3,194	1.53
Write-in		109	0.05
Total votes		208,963	100.00
Republican hold			

==== By county ====
County	Bill Goodling Republican		Scott Chronister Democratic		Francis Worley Independent		Write-in		Margin		Total votes cast
County	#	%	#	%	#	%	#	%	#	%	Total votes cast
Adams	17,039	58.14%	11,447	39.06%	822	2.80%	0	0.00%	5,592	19.08%	29,308
Cumberland	37,909	67.24%	17,209	30.53%	1,179	2.09%	79	0.14%	20,700	36.71%	56,376
York	75,768	61.48%	46,288	37.56%	1,193	0.97%	0	0.00%	29,480	23.92%	123,249
Totals	130,716	62.56%	74,944	35.87%	3,194	1.53%	79	0.04%	55,772	26.69%	208,933

== District 20 ==
1996 Pennsylvania's 20th congressional district
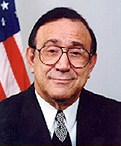

Nominee	Frank Mascara	Mike McCormick
Party	Democratic	Republican
Popular vote	113,394	97,004
Percentage	53.89%	46.10%
U.S. Representative before election
Frank Mascara
Democratic
Elected U.S. Representative
Frank Mascara
Democratic

=== Democratic primary ===
==== Candidates ====
===== Nominee =====
- Frank Mascara, incumbent U.S. Representative

==== Primary results ====
Democratic primary results
Party	Candidate	Votes	%
Democratic	Frank Mascara (incumbent)	49,911	100.00
Total votes		49,911	100.00

=== Republican primary ===
==== Candidates ====
===== Nominee =====
- Mike McCormick

==== Primary results ====
Republican primary results
Party	Candidate	Votes	%
Republican	Mike McCormick	20,177	100.00
Total votes		20,177	100.00

=== General election ===
Pennsylvania's 20th congressional district, 1996
Party	Candidate	Votes	%
Democratic	Frank Mascara (incumbent)	113,394	53.89
Republican	Mike McCormick	97,004	46.10
Write-in		4	0.00
Total votes		210,402	100.00
Democratic hold			

==== By county ====
County	Frank Mascara Democratic		Mike McCormick Republican		Margin		Total votes cast
County	#	%	#	%	#	%	Total votes cast
Allegheny	21,556	41.19%	30,775	58.81%	–9,219	–17.62%	52,331
Fayette	18,023	64.69%	9,838	35.31%	8,185	29.38%	27,861
Greene	8,937	66.06%	4,592	33.94%	4,345	32.12%	13,529
Washington	43,964	57.11%	33,015	42.89%	10,949	14.22%	76,979
Westmoreland	21,038	53.32%	18,420	46.68%	2,618	6.64%	39,458
Totals	113,518	54.02%	96,640	45.98%	16,878	8.03%	210,158

== District 21 ==
1996 Pennsylvania's 21st congressional district election
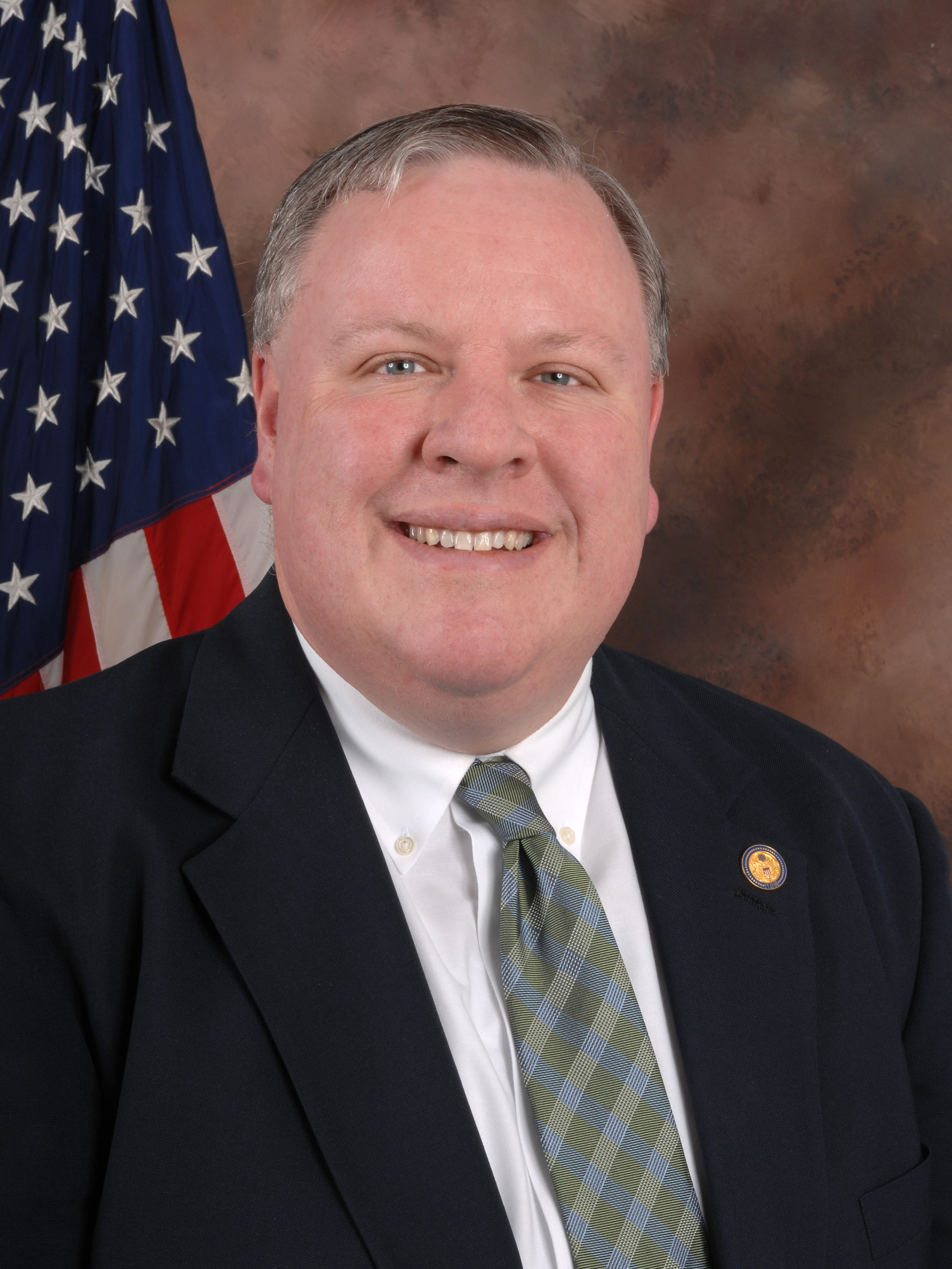

Nominee	Phil English	Ron DiNicola
Party	Republican	Democratic
Popular vote	106,875	104,004
Percentage	50.68%	49.32%
U.S. Representative before election
Phil English
Republican
Elected U.S. Representative
Phil English
Republican

=== Democratic primary ===
==== Candidates ====
===== Nominee =====
- Ron DiNicola, U.S. Marine veteran and Erie County solicitor

==== Primary results ====
Democratic primary results
Party	Candidate	Votes	%
Democratic	Ron DiNicola	31,188	100.00
Total votes		31,188	100.00

=== Republican primary ===
==== Candidates ====
===== Nominee =====
- Phil English, incumbent U.S. Representative

==== Primary results ====
Republican primary results
Party	Candidate	Votes	%
Republican	Phil English (incumbent)	33,398	100.00
Total votes		33,398	100.00

=== General election ===
Pennsylvania's 21st congressional district, 1996
Party	Candidate	Votes	%
Republican	Phil English (incumbent)	106,875	50.68
Democratic	Ron DiNicola	104,004	49.32
Write-in		9	0.00
Total votes		210,888	100.00
Republican hold			

==== By county ====
County	Phil English Republican		Ron DiNicola Democratic		Write-in		Margin		Total votes cast
County	#	%	#	%	#	%	#	%	Total votes cast
Butler	23,512	59.40%	16,069	40.60%	0	0.00%	7,443	18.80%	39,581
Crawford	12,622	55.49%	10,124	44.51%	0	0.00%	2,498	10.98%	22,746
Erie	50,597	47.93%	54,972	52.07%	0	0.00%	–4,375	–4.14%	105,569
Mercer	20,166	46.88%	22,839	53.10%	8	0.02%	–2,673	–6.22%	43,013
Totals	106,897	50.68%	104,004	49.32%	8	0.00%	2,893	1.36%	210,909

== See also ==
- Pennsylvania's congressional delegations
- 105th United States Congress
