= Kerry Benninghoff =

American politician

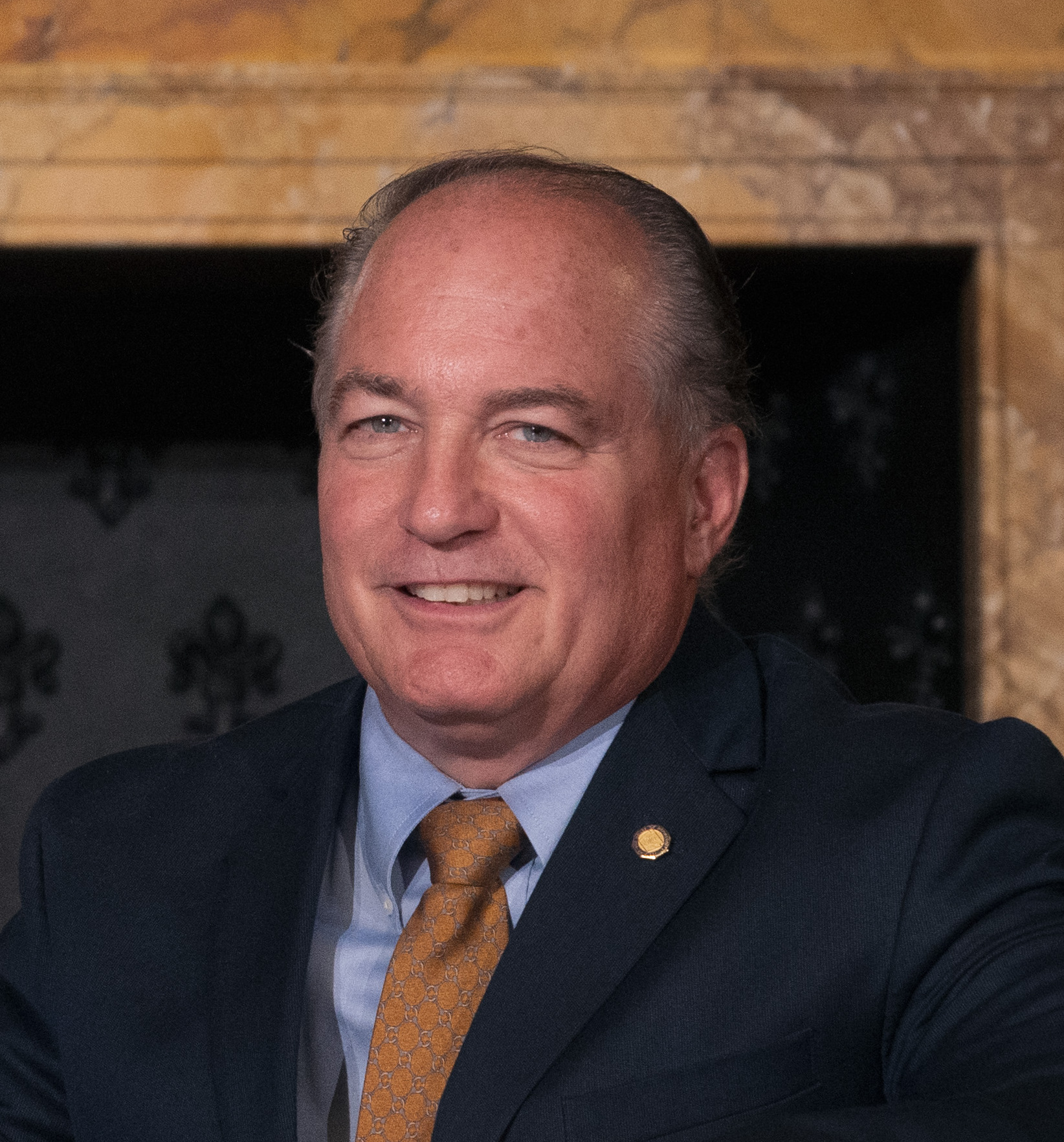

Majority Leader of the Pennsylvania House of Representatives
- In office June 22, 2020 – December 1, 2022
- Preceded by: Bryan Cutler
- Succeeded by: Joanna McClinton

Majority Whip of the Pennsylvania House of Representatives
- In office December 1, 2018 – June 22, 2020
- Leader: Bryan Cutler
- Preceded by: Bryan Cutler
- Succeeded by: Donna Oberlander

Member of the Pennsylvania House of Representatives from the 171st district
- Incumbent
- Assumed office January 7, 1997
- Preceded by: Ruth C. Rudy

Personal details
- Born: January 14, 1962 (age 64) Lebanon, Pennsylvania, U.S.
- Party: Republican
- Children: 5
- Education: Pennsylvania State University
- Website: Official website

Kerry Albert Benninghoff (born January 14, 1962) is an American politician and coroner serving as a member of the Pennsylvania House of Representatives from the 171st district. Elected in November 1996, he assumed office on January 7, 1997.

== Early life and education ==
Benninghoff was born in Lebanon, Pennsylvania on January 14, 1962. He graduated from State College Area High School and attended Pennsylvania State University from 1980 to 1981. He is also a graduate of the Certified Coroners Training Program of the Pennsylvania State Police Academy.

== Career ==
While working as an orderly at Mount Nittany Medical Center in State College, Pennsylvania, Benninghoff was appointed as deputy coroner of Centre County, Pennsylvania in 1985. In 1991, when Coroner Robert Neff retired, Benninghoff was elected to the office. He was re-elected in 1995.

In 1996, when Representative Ruth Rudy retired, Benninghoff declared his candidacy to succeed her. He defeated Democrat Keith Bierly in the general election that year and has been re-elected to each succeeding session of the House.

In 2018, after being re-elected to the House, Benninghoff was elected by members of the Republican Caucus to serve as House majority whip.

On June 22, 2020, Bennighoff was elected House majority leader. As majority leader, Benninghoff is the second highest-ranking Republican in the chamber behind Speaker Bryan Cutler.

Benninghoff is against legalizing adult-use cannabis in Pennsylvania. He has described it as a gateway drug and cites the opioid epidemic as a concern.

== House of Representatives ==
For the 2025-2026 Session, Benninghoff sits on the following committees:

- Transportation (Republican Chair)
- Gaming Oversight
- Rules

== Personal life ==
Benninghoff lives in Bellefonte, Pennsylvania. He has five children.

Pennsylvania House of Representatives
Preceded by Ruth C. Rudy	Member of the Pennsylvania House of Representatives from the 171st district 1997–present	Incumbent
Preceded by Bryan Cutler	Majority Leader of the Pennsylvania House of Representatives; 2020–2022	Succeeded by Bryan Cutler
