= Ventnor City, New Jersey =

City in Atlantic County, New Jersey, US

- City
- City of Ventnor City
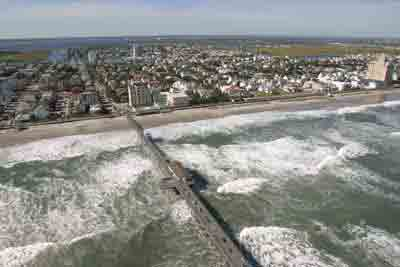
- Atlantic Ocean shoreline at Ventnor City

- Coat of Arms
- Motto: Shore'ly the Best!
- Location of Ventnor City in Atlantic County highlighted in red (left). Inset map: Location of Atlantic County in New Jersey highlighted in orange (right).

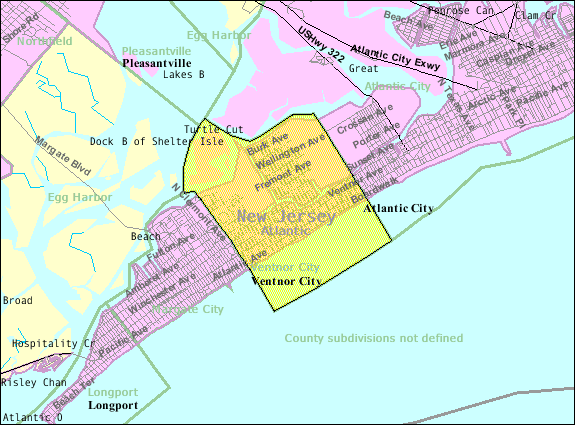
- Census Bureau map of Ventnor City, New Jersey

- Location in Atlantic County Location in New Jersey Location in the United States
- Coordinates: 39.342076°N 74.482649°W
- Country: United States
- State: New Jersey
- County: Atlantic
- Incorporated: March 17, 1903
- Named for: Ventnor, Isle of Wight

Government
  - Type: Walsh Act
  - Body: Board of Commissioners
  - Mayor: Tim Kriebel (term ends May 2028)
  - Administrator: Tom Ciccarone
  - Municipal clerk: Lisa H. Hand

Area
  - Total: 3.53 sq mi (9.13 km^{2})
  - Land: 1.95 sq mi (5.06 km^{2})
  - Water: 1.57 sq mi (4.06 km^{2}) 44.52%
  - Rank: 314th of 565 in state 21st of 23 in county
- Elevation: 3 ft (0.91 m)

Population (2020)
  - Total: 9,210
  - Estimate (2023): 9,226
  - Rank: 258th of 565 in state 8th of 23 in county
  - Density: 4,711/sq mi (1,819/km^{2})
  - Rank: 123rd of 565 in state 1st of 23 in county
- Time zone: UTC−05:00 (Eastern (EST))
  - Summer (DST): UTC−04:00 (Eastern (EDT))
- ZIP Code: 08406
- Area code: 609
- FIPS code: 3400175620
- GNIS feature ID: 0885426
- Website: www.ventnorcity.org

Ventnor City is a city situated on the Jersey Shore on Absecon Island, within Atlantic County, in the U.S. state of New Jersey, on the Atlantic Ocean. As of the 2020 United States census, the city's population was 9,210, a decrease of 1,440 (−13.5%) from the 2010 census count of 10,650, which in turn reflected a decrease of 2,260 (−17.5%) from the 12,910 counted in the 2000 census. The city, and all of Atlantic County, is part of the Atlantic City–Hammonton metropolitan statistical area, which is part of the Philadelphia metropolitan area.

Ventnor City was incorporated as a city by an act of the New Jersey Legislature on March 17, 1903, from portions of Egg Harbor Township.

== History ==
S. Bartram Richards, the wife of the secretary-treasurer of the Camden and Atlantic Land Company, suggested the name "Ventnor" for the area then being developed by the company south of Atlantic City, having recently visited the English seaside resort on the Isle of Wight with the same name. The name was chosen in January 1889. The city was formally incorporated by the New Jersey Legislature on March 17, 1903.

Chapter 51 of the laws and Sessions of the State of New Jersey provided the beginning to Ventnor City, stating:

Be it enacted by the Senate and General Assembly of New Jersey that all part or portion of the County of Atlantic, formerly a part of Egg Harbor Township, situated on Absecon Beach, lying between the Westwardly limit of Atlantic City and the Eastwardly limit of South Atlantic City, the Atlantic Ocean on the south as far as the jurisdiction of the State extends, and to the center of Beach Thoroughfare on the North, be, and is hereby constituted as a City of this State, and all of the inhabitants of the State residing within the limits aforesaid be and they are hereby ordained, constituted and declared to be from time to time forever hereafter one body politic and corporate, in fact and in name, by the name, Ventnor City. This act shall take effect immediately, and was approved on March 17, 1903.

The first meeting was held on April 20, 1903, in the Carisbrooke Inn, which was located behind the present City Hall, on Atlantic Avenue between Cambridge and Sacramento Avenues; Carisbrooke is also a place name taken from the Isle of Wight.

== Geography ==
According to the United States Census Bureau, Ventnor City city had a total area of 3.52 square miles (9.13 km^{2}), including 1.96 square miles (5.07 km^{2}) of land and 1.57 square miles (4.06 km^{2}) of water (44.52%).

The city is located on 8.1-mile (13.0 km) long Absecon Island, along with Atlantic City to the northeast, and Margate City and Longport on the southwest. The boardwalk runs along the entire 1.7-mile (2.7 km) Ventnor City beach front and is connected to the Atlantic City Boardwalk. It ends at Ventnor City's border with Margate City. The city borders Atlantic City and Margate City.

== Demographics ==
Historical population
Census	Pop.	Note	%±
1910	491		—
1920	2,193		346.6%
1930	6,674		204.3%
1940	7,905		18.4%
1950	8,158		3.2%
1960	8,688		6.5%
1970	10,385		19.5%
1980	11,704		12.7%
1990	11,005		−6.0%
2000	12,910		17.3%
2010	10,650		−17.5%
2020	9,210		−13.5%
2023 (est.)	9,226		0.2%
Population sources: 1910–2000; 1910–1920 1910 1910–1930; 1940–2000 2000; 2010 2020

=== 2020 census ===
As of the 2020 census, Ventnor City had a population of 9,210. The median age was 51.7 years. 14.3% of residents were under the age of 18 and 26.8% of residents were 65 years of age or older. For every 100 females there were 95.0 males, and for every 100 females age 18 and over there were 92.1 males age 18 and over.

99.6% of residents lived in urban areas, while 0.4% lived in rural areas.

There were 4,296 households in Ventnor City, of which 17.8% had children under the age of 18 living in them. Of all households, 37.8% were married-couple households, 22.2% were households with a male householder and no spouse or partner present, and 33.6% were households with a female householder and no spouse or partner present. About 38.5% of all households were made up of individuals and 18.4% had someone living alone who was 65 years of age or older.

There were 7,897 housing units, of which 45.6% were vacant. The homeowner vacancy rate was 3.1% and the rental vacancy rate was 12.3%.

Racial composition as of the 2020 census
Race	Number	Percent
White	6,722	73.0%
Black or African American	281	3.1%
American Indian and Alaska Native	15	0.2%
Asian	723	7.9%
Native Hawaiian and Other Pacific Islander	5	0.1%
Some other race	696	7.6%
Two or more races	768	8.3%
Hispanic or Latino (of any race)	1,434	15.6%

=== 2010 census ===
The 2010 United States census counted 10,650 people, 4,592 households, and 2,645 families in the city. The population density was 5,457.4 per square mile (2,107.1/km^{2}). There were 7,829 housing units at an average density of 4,011.8 per square mile (1,549.0/km^{2}). The racial makeup was 75.83% (8,076) White, 4.25% (453) Black or African American, 0.47% (50) Native American, 8.68% (924) Asian, 0.05% (5) Pacific Islander, 8.08% (860) from other races, and 2.65% (282) from two or more races. Hispanic or Latino of any race were 18.05% (1,922) of the population.

Of the 4,592 households, 20.9% had children under the age of 18; 39.3% were married couples living together; 13.0% had a female householder with no husband present and 42.4% were non-families. Of all households, 34.6% were made up of individuals and 15.7% had someone living alone who was 65 years of age or older. The average household size was 2.32 and the average family size was 3.00.

18.5% of the population were under the age of 18, 7.8% from 18 to 24, 22.7% from 25 to 44, 31.0% from 45 to 64, and 19.9% who were 65 years of age or older. The median age was 45.5 years. For every 100 females, the population had 94.0 males. For every 100 females ages 18 and older there were 90.0 males.

The Census Bureau's 2006–2010 American Community Survey showed that (in 2010 inflation-adjusted dollars) median household income was $52,465 (with a margin of error of ± $3,688) and the median family income was $66,467 (± $9,437). Males had a median income of $42,560 (± $12,377) versus $33,693 (± $5,007) for females. The per capita income for the city was $34,790 (± $4,057). About 9.0% of families and 10.6% of the population were below the poverty line, including 16.1% of those under age 18 and 10.0% of those age 65 or over.

=== 2000 census ===
As of the 2000 United States census there were 12,910 people, 5,480 households, and 3,255 families residing in the city. The population density was 6,023.2 inhabitants per square mile (2,325.6/km^{2}). There were 8,009 housing units at an average density of 1, 445.0/km^{2} (3,736.6/sq mi). The racial makeup of the city was 77.10% White, 2.94% African American, 0.19% Native American, 7.45% Asian, 0.03% Pacific Islander, 9.37% from other races, and 2.93% from two or more races. Hispanic or Latino of any race were 17.14% of the population.

The most common ethnic groups reported in the 2000 Census in Ventnor City were Italian (22.8%), Irish (15.5%), German (8.7%), English (6.2%), Russian (4.2%), Polish (3.6%).

There were 5,480 households, out of which 23.0% had children under the age of 18 living with them, 42.5% were married couples living together, 12.0% had a female householder with no husband present, and 40.6% were non-families. 33.5% of all households were made up of individuals, and 14.7% had someone living alone who was 65 years of age or older. The average household size was 2.35 and the average family size was 3.02.

In the city the population was spread out, with 20.0% under the age of 18, 7.1% from 18 to 24, 29.6% from 25 to 44, 23.6% from 45 to 64, and 19.8% who were 65 years of age or older. The median age was 41 years. For every 100 females, there were 91.0 males. For every 100 females age 18 and over, there were 87.4 males.

The median income for a household in the city was $42,478, and the median income for a family was $52,701. Males had a median income of $31,300 versus $26,788 for females. The per capita income for the city was $22,631. About 3.4% of families and 7.0% of the population were below the poverty line, including 7.8% of those under age 18 and 6.0% of those age 65 or over.

== Government ==
=== Local government ===
On September 17, 1968, the existing Mayor-Council form of government was changed to a Commission form of government, under the Walsh Act, one of seven municipalities (of the 564) statewide that use this form. The governing body is comprised of three Commissioners who are elected at-large to serve four-year terms on a concurrent basis in non-partisan elections held as part of the May municipal election. After each election, the three elected commissioners are each assigned a department to oversee and choose one of their members to serve as Mayor.

As of 2025, the members of the Ventnor City Board of Commissioners, serving concurrent terms of office ending May 2028, are Mayor Tim Kriebel (Commissioner of Public Safety), Lance B. Landgraf Jr.(Commissioner of Public Works and Code Enforcement) and Maria Mento (Commissioner of Revenue and Finance).

Beth Holtzman stepped down as mayor in January 2023 as she was moving out of the city. The next month, Lance Landgraf took office as mayor and administrator Maria Mento was appointed to fill Holtzman's seat as commissioner on an interim basis until the November 2023 general election, when voters will choose a candidate to serve the balance of the term of office.

In the 2016 municipal elections, the Imagine Ventnor slate of Beth Holtzman, Tim Kriebel and Lance Landgraf won election in a field of five candidates, with none of the incumbents running for re-election.

In the May 2012 elections, challengers Mike Bagnell (with 1,213 votes) and Frank Sarno (1,175) won seats on the commission, while incumbent Theresa Kelly won the third seat with 1,164 votes, putting her two votes ahead of Albert Battaglia after provisional ballots were counted.

Michael Advena was sworn into office in November 2011 after winning a special election for the vacant seat that had been held by Stephen Weintrob.

=== Federal, state and county representation ===
Ventnor City is located in the 2nd Congressional District and is part of New Jersey's 2nd state legislative district.

For the 119th United States Congress, New Jersey's 2nd congressional district is represented by Jeff Van Drew (R, Dennis Township). New Jersey is represented in the United States Senate by Democrats Cory Booker (Newark, term ends 2027) and Andy Kim (Moorestown, term ends 2031).

For the 2026–2027 session, the 2nd legislative district of the New Jersey Legislature is represented in the New Jersey Senate by Vincent J. Polistina (R, Egg Harbor Township) and in the General Assembly by Don Guardian (R, Atlantic City) and Maureen Rowan (D, Atlantic City).

Atlantic County is governed by a directly elected county executive and a nine-member Board of County Commissioners, responsible for legislation. The executive serves a four-year term and the commissioners are elected to staggered three-year terms, of which four are elected from the county on an at-large basis and five of the commissioners represent equally populated districts. As of 2025, Atlantic County's Executive is Dennis Levinson (R, Northfield), whose term of office ends December 31, 2027. Members of the Board of County Commissioners are:

Ernest D. Coursey (D, District 1-- Atlantic City, Egg Harbor Township (part), Longport, Margate City, and Ventnor City; 2025, Atlantic City), Chair Maureen Kern (R, District 2-- Egg Harbor Township (part), Linwood, Northfield, Somers Point and Pleasantville; 2027, Somers Point), Andrew Parker III (R, District 3-- Egg Harbor Township (part) and Hamilton Township (part); 2026, Egg Harbor Township), Richard R. Dase (R, District 4, including Brigantine, Galloway Township, Egg Harbor Township (part), and Port Republic; 2025, Galloway Township), Vice Chair James A. Bertino (R, District 5-- Buena, Buena Vista Township, Corbin City, Egg Harbor City, Estell Manor, Folsom, Hamilton Township (part), Hammonton, Mullica Township and Weymouth Township; 2027, Hammonton), June Byrnes (R, At-Large; 2026, Linwood), Michael Ruffu (R, At-Large; Margate, 2027) Amy L. Gatto (R, At-large; 2025, Hamilton Township) and John W. Risley (R, At-Large; 2026, Egg Harbor Township)

Atlantic County's constitutional officers are: Clerk Joesph J. Giralo (R, 2026, Hammonton), Sheriff Joe O'Donoghue (R, 2026, Egg Harbor Township) and Surrogate James Curcio (R, 2025, Hammonton).

=== Politics ===
As of March 2011, there were a total of 6,293 registered voters in Ventnor City, of which 1,636 (26.0% vs. 30.5% countywide) were registered as Democrats, 2,012 (32.0% vs. 25.2%) were registered as Republicans and 2,644 (42.0% vs. 44.3%) were registered as Unaffiliated. There was one voter registered to another party. Among the city's 2010 Census population, 59.1% (vs. 58.8% in Atlantic County) were registered to vote, including 72.5% of those ages 18 and over (vs. 76.6% countywide).

Gubernatorial election results for Ventnor City
Year	Republican		Democratic		Third party(ies)	
Year	No.	%	No.	%	No.	%
2025	1,738	48.49%	1,831	51.09%	15	0.42%
2021	1,599	53.57%	1,364	45.70%	22	0.74%
2017	1,073	46.23%	1,194	51.44%	54	2.33%
2013	1,806	68.90%	775	29.57%	40	1.53%
2009	1,548	51.67%	1,290	43.06%	158	5.27%
2005	1,261	43.51%	1,557	53.73%	80	2.76%

In the 2012 presidential election, Democrat Barack Obama received 2,170 votes (51.8% vs. 57.9% countywide), ahead of Republican Mitt Romney with 1,965 votes (46.9% vs. 41.1%) and other candidates with 30 votes (0.7% vs. 0.9%), among the 4,192 ballots cast by the city's 6,861 registered voters, for a turnout of 61.1% (vs. 65.8% in Atlantic County). In the 2008 presidential election, Democrat Barack Obama received 2,372 votes (50.3% vs. 56.5% countywide), ahead of Republican John McCain with 2,257 votes (47.8% vs. 41.6%) and other candidates with 50 votes (1.1% vs. 1.1%), among the 4,718 ballots cast by the city's 7,009 registered voters, for a turnout of 67.3% (vs. 68.1% in Atlantic County). In the 2004 presidential election, Democrat John Kerry received 2,493 votes (52.1% vs. 52.0% countywide), ahead of Republican George W. Bush with 2,205 votes (46.1% vs. 46.2%) and other candidates with 32 votes (0.7% vs. 0.8%), among the 4,783 ballots cast by the city's 6,726 registered voters, for a turnout of 71.1% (vs. 69.8% in the whole county).

Presidential elections results
Year	Republican	Democratic	Third Parties
2024	51.4% 2,365	46.6% 2,144	2.0% 73
2020	47.8% 2,448	51.1% 2,619	1.1% 56
2016	47.0% 1,871	48.4% 1,924	4.6% 184
2012	46.9% 1,965	51.8% 2,170	0.7% 30
2008	47.8% 2,257	50.3% 2,372	1.1% 50
2004	46.1% 2,205	52.1% 2,493	0.7% 32

In the 2013 gubernatorial election, Republican Chris Christie received 1,806 votes (66.9% vs. 60.0% countywide), ahead of Democrat Barbara Buono with 775 votes (28.7% vs. 34.9%) and other candidates with 40 votes (1.5% vs. 1.3%), among the 2,699 ballots cast by the city's 6,897 registered voters, yielding a 39.1% turnout (vs. 41.5% in the county). In the 2009 gubernatorial election, Republican Chris Christie received 1,548 votes (50.9% vs. 47.7% countywide), ahead of Democrat Jon Corzine with 1,290 votes (42.4% vs. 44.5%), Independent Chris Daggett with 132 votes (4.3% vs. 4.8%) and other candidates with 26 votes (0.9% vs. 1.2%), among the 3,043 ballots cast by the city's 6,549 registered voters, yielding a 46.5% turnout (vs. 44.9% in the county).

United States Senate election results for Ventnor City1
Year	Republican		Democratic		Third party(ies)	
Year	No.	%	No.	%	No.	%
2024	2,227	50.79%	2,074	47.30%	84	1.92%
2018	1,634	53.07%	1,334	43.33%	111	3.61%
2012	1,802	46.17%	2,042	52.32%	59	1.51%
2006	1,344	46.47%	1,492	51.59%	56	1.94%

United States Senate election results for Ventnor City2
Year	Republican		Democratic		Third party(ies)	
Year	No.	%	No.	%	No.	%
2020	2,364	47.40%	2,526	50.65%	97	1.95%
2014	1,226	51.99%	1,074	45.55%	58	2.46%
2013	844	54.42%	686	44.23%	21	1.35%
2008	2,020	47.09%	2,210	51.52%	60	1.40%

== Education ==
The Ventnor City School District serves public school students in pre-kindergarten through eighth grade. As of the 2023–24 school year, the district, comprised of two schools, had an enrollment of 495 students and 71.0 classroom teachers (on an FTE basis), for a student–teacher ratio of 7.0:1. The Ventnor City School District operates two schools for Pre-K–8 within the Ventnor Educational Community Complex. The Ventnor City School District operates two schools for PreK-8 within the Ventnor Educational Community Complex. Schools in the district (with 2023–24 enrollment data from the National Center for Education Statistics) are Ventnor Elementary School with 302 students in grades PreK–5 and > Ventnor Middle School with 177 students in grades 6–8. The district's board of education consists of seven members who set policy and oversee the fiscal and educational operation of the district through its administration. As a Type I school district, the board's trustees are appointed by the mayor to serve three-year terms of office on a staggered basis, with either two or three members up for reappointment each year. Of the more than 680 school districts statewide, Ventnor City is one of approximately a dozen districts with appointed school districts.

Public school students in ninth through twelfth grades, along with those from Brigantine and Margate City, attend Atlantic City High School in neighboring Atlantic City, as part of a sending/receiving relationship with the Atlantic City School District that has existed since 1920. As of the 2023–24 school year, the high school had an enrollment of 1,699 students and 144.8 classroom teachers (on an FTE basis), for a student–teacher ratio of 11.7:1. The Ventnor district has considered options for an alternative high school sending relationship.

City public school students are also eligible to attend the Atlantic County Institute of Technology in the Mays Landing section of Hamilton Township or the Charter-Tech High School for the Performing Arts, located in Somers Point.

The Roman Catholic Diocese of Camden operated St. James School, a K–8 school, until 2008, when it merged with Blessed Sacrament School in Margate City into Holy Family Regional School (using the St. James site). By 2011 it had a loss of $172,000 and only had 92 students. The sponsoring churches of Holy Family were Holy Trinity Church in Ventnor and St. Gianna Beretta Church of Northfield. The diocese announced that it would close Holy Family at the end of the 2010–2011 school year, as its enrollment was insufficient to cover the deficit. The building was demolished in 2016.

== Transportation ==
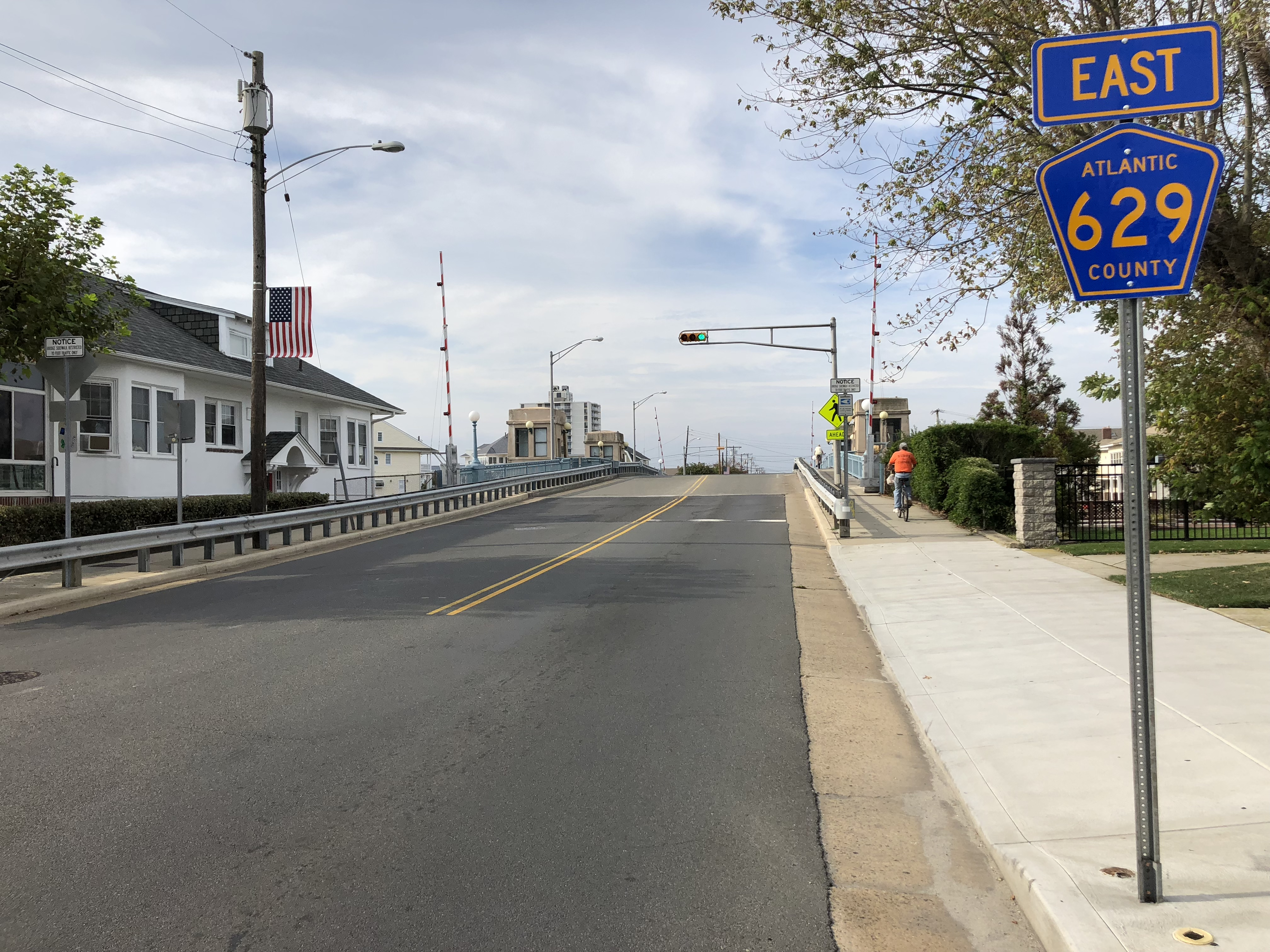
County Route 629 in Ventnor City

=== Roads and highways ===
As of May 2010, the city had a total of 36.45 miles (58.66 km) of roadways, of which 34.03 miles (54.77 km) were maintained by the municipality and 2.42 miles (3.89 km) by the county.

No Interstate, U.S., state or major county highway directly serves Ventnor City. The only numbered roads in Ventnor City are minor county routes, such as County Route 629.

=== Dorset Avenue Bridge ===
Dorset Avenue Bridge is a double-leaf bascule drawbridge across the Intracoastal Waterway (ICW) Inside Thorofare. Its operation is federally regulated. The bridge serves as a link in County Route 629.

=== Public transportation ===
NJ Transit provides bus service in the city to Atlantic City on routes 504 (from Margate City) and 505 (from Longport).

== Climate ==
According to the Köppen climate classification system, Ventnor City has a humid subtropical climate (Cfa) with hot, moderately humid summers, cool winters and year-around precipitation. Cfa climates are characterized by all months having an average mean temperature above 32.0 °F (0.0 °C), at least four months with an average mean temperature at or above 50.0 °F (10.0 °C), at least one month with an average mean temperature at or above 71.6 °F (22.0 °C) and no significant precipitation difference between seasons. During the summer months in Ventnor City, a cooling afternoon sea breeze is present on most days, but episodes of extreme heat and humidity can occur with heat index values at or above 95.0 °F (35.0 °C). During the winter months, episodes of extreme cold and wind can occur with wind chill values below 0.0 °F (−17.8 °C). The plant hardiness zone at Ventnor City Beach is 7b with an average annual extreme minimum air temperature of 8.0 °C (46.4 °F). The average seasonal (November–April) snowfall total is 12 to 18 inches (30 to 46 cm), and the average snowiest month is February which corresponds with the annual peak in nor'easter activity.

Climate data for Ventnor City Beach, NJ (1981–2010 Averages)
Month	Jan	Feb	Mar	Apr	May	Jun	Jul	Aug	Sep	Oct	Nov	Dec	Year
Mean daily maximum °F (°C)	41.4 (5.2)	43.4 (6.3)	50.2 (10.1)	58.9 (14.9)	68.2 (20.1)	77.2 (25.1)	82.2 (27.9)	81.1 (27.3)	75.6 (24.2)	65.4 (18.6)	56.1 (13.4)	46.4 (8.0)	62.3 (16.8)
Daily mean °F (°C)	33.9 (1.1)	35.8 (2.1)	42.3 (5.7)	51.1 (10.6)	60.4 (15.8)	69.8 (21.0)	75.1 (23.9)	74.1 (23.4)	68.0 (20.0)	57.4 (14.1)	48.2 (9.0)	38.7 (3.7)	54.7 (12.6)
Mean daily minimum °F (°C)	26.3 (−3.2)	28.2 (−2.1)	34.3 (1.3)	43.4 (6.3)	52.6 (11.4)	62.4 (16.9)	68.0 (20.0)	67.1 (19.5)	60.4 (15.8)	49.3 (9.6)	40.2 (4.6)	31.1 (−0.5)	47.0 (8.3)
Average precipitation inches (mm)	3.22 (82)	2.88 (73)	4.14 (105)	3.57 (91)	3.17 (81)	2.91 (74)	3.33 (85)	4.09 (104)	3.04 (77)	3.59 (91)	3.35 (85)	3.88 (99)	41.17 (1,046)
Average relative humidity (%)	68.1	67.0	63.8	65.1	69.6	73.4	73.4	75.3	73.7	71.9	69.8	68.7	70.0
Average dew point °F (°C)	24.5 (−4.2)	25.9 (−3.4)	30.9 (−0.6)	39.8 (4.3)	50.4 (10.2)	60.9 (16.1)	66.0 (18.9)	65.8 (18.8)	59.3 (15.2)	48.4 (9.1)	38.8 (3.8)	29.3 (−1.5)	45.1 (7.3)
Source: PRISM

Climate data for Atlantic City, NJ Ocean Water Temperature (3 NE Ventnor City)
Month	Jan	Feb	Mar	Apr	May	Jun	Jul	Aug	Sep	Oct	Nov	Dec	Year
Daily mean °F (°C)	37 (3)	35 (2)	42 (6)	48 (9)	56 (13)	63 (17)	70 (21)	73 (23)	70 (21)	61 (16)	53 (12)	44 (7)	54 (12)
Source: NOAA

== Ecology ==
According to the A. W. Kuchler U.S. potential natural vegetation types, Ventnor City would have a dominant vegetation type of Northern Cordgrass (73) with a dominant vegetation form of Coastal Prairie (20).

== Notable people ==
People who were born in, residents of, or otherwise closely associated with Ventnor City include:

- Ellen Bass (born 1947), poet and author
- Chris A. Brown (born 1964), politician who served in the New Jersey General Assembly from 2012 to 2021, representing the 2nd Legislative District
- B. J. Callaghan (born 1981), association football manager of Nashville SC, who was interim head coach of the United States men's national soccer team in 2023
- Wayne Colman (born 1946), linebacker who played for the Philadelphia Eagles and New Orleans Saints
- Louise Todd Cope (1930–2020), artist, educator and poet
- Royden B. Davis (1923–2002), Dean of Georgetown College
- Walter Evans Edge (1873–1956), Governor of New Jersey from 1917 to 1919 and again from 1944 to 1947
- Angelo Errichetti (1928–2013), politician who served as Mayor of Camden and in the New Jersey Senate before being convicted during Abscam
- George Emerick Essig (1838-1923), marine art painter
- Frank S. Farley (1901–1977), New Jersey State Senator who was a Republican political boss in Atlantic County
- Benjamin Foulois (1879–1967), United States Army general and aviation pioneer
- Robert Geddes (1923–2023), architect who served as dean of the Princeton University School of Architecture
- Roland Greenfield (1919–1997), member of the Pennsylvania House of Representatives from the 171st District
- Anne Heche (1969–2022), actress, known for her roles across a variety of genres in film, television and theater
- Pinky Kravitz (1927–2015), radio broadcaster and print journalist
- Frank LoBiondo (born 1946), member of Congress from New Jersey's 2nd congressional district
- Barry Lubin (born 1952), "Grandma" of the Big Apple Circus
- Siegmund Lubin (1851–1923), German-American motion picture pioneer who founded the Lubin Manufacturing Company
- Sol Metzger (1880–1932), football player and coach
- Benjamin F. Musser (1889–1951), poet and author who was the first poet laureate of New Jersey
- Charles Henry Parkhurst (1842–1933), clergyman and social reformer who died after sleepwalking off the porch of his Ventnor home
- Greg Roman (born 1972), National Football League assistant coach
- John Roman (born 1952), former professional American football offensive lineman who played seven seasons in the NFL for the New York Jets
- Cathy Rush (born 1947), former women's basketball program head coach at Immaculata University who led the team to three consecutive AIAW national titles from 1972–1974
- Mike Segal (1922–1982), politician and businessman who led the initiative to legalize gambling in Atlantic City
- Vivian B. Smith (1886–1952), architect
- Valerie Solanas (1936–1988), radical feminist author who shot and nearly killed Andy Warhol
- Justin Williams (born 1981), professional ice hockey right winger with the Carolina Hurricanes who brought the Stanley Cup to Ventnor City Hall in 2012

Preceded by Atlantic City	Beaches of New Jersey	Succeeded by Margate City
