= Ludendorf =

Coordinates: 50°39′53″N 6°53′13″E

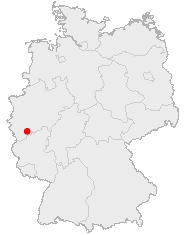
Location of Swisttal in Germany.

Ludendorf is a village in the municipality Swisttal in the North Rhine-Westphalian Rhein-Sieg district. It is situated approximately 18 km southwest of Bonn. On January 11, 2024, the village had a population of 525. The city hall of the municipality Swisttal is located between Ludendorf and the neighboring village Swisttal-Essig.
