= Roland Greenfield =

American politician

Member of the Pennsylvania House of Representatives from the 171st district
- In office 1969–1982
- Preceded by: District created
- Succeeded by: Ruth C. Rudy

Member of the Pennsylvania House of Representatives from the Philadelphia County district
- In office 1967–1968

Personal details
- Born: June 19, 1919 Philadelphia, Pennsylvania
- Died: August 22, 1997 (aged 78) Ventnor City, New Jersey
- Party: Democratic

Roland Greenfield (June 19, 1919 – August 22, 1997) was a former Democratic member of the Pennsylvania House of Representatives.

A resident of Ventnor City, New Jersey, Greenfield died at the age of 78 at Philadelphia's University of Pennsylvania Hospital.
