= Dorset Avenue Bridge =

Vehicular bridge

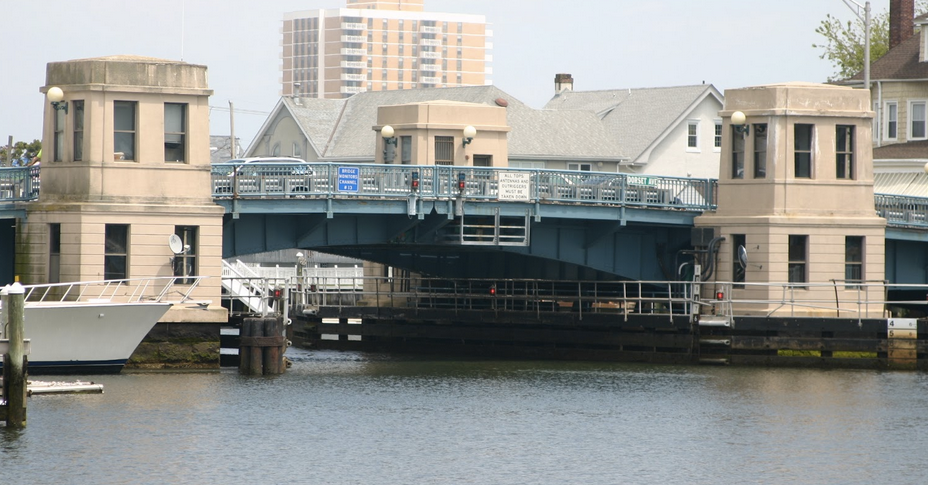
- Coordinates: 39°20′30″N 74°28′42″W
- Carries: CR 629
- Crosses: Inner Thorofare; Intracoastal Waterway
- Locale: Ventnor City; New Jersey
- Maintained by: Atlantic County
- ID number: 01V0001

Characteristics
- Design: Strauss bascule
- Material: Steel/concrete
- Total length: 220.2 ft (67.1 m)
- Width: 36.1 ft (11.0 m) (deck); 16 ft (4.9 m) (sidewalks)
- Longest span: 79.1 ft (24.1 m)
- No. of spans: 3
- Clearance below: 9 ft (2.7 m)

History
- Designer: A.H. Nelson
- Opened: 1929

The Dorset Avenue Bridge is a vehicular bridge in Ventnor City, Atlantic County, New Jersey, south of in Atlantic City. The double-leaf Strauss trunnion bascule drawbridge spans the Intracoastal Waterway (ICW) Inside Thorofare (MP 72.1) and carries CR 629 (MP 3.2) in Ventnor Heights and St Leonard's Tract on Absecon Island.

== History and status ==
The bridge opened in 1929. The bridge underwent substantial rehabilitation in 1994, with much of its mechanical functions replaced, while the "look" of the bridge was maintained. At each corner are concrete buildings now used as the operators' house, a storage room, machine room, and comfort stations.

A historic bridge survey conducted by the New Jersey Department of Transportation (NJDOT) from 1991 to 1994 determined that the bridge was eligible for listing on the New Jersey Register of Historic Places and the National Register of Historic Places. In February 2016, the State Historic Preservation Office filed its opinion (#5516).

The bridge was severely damaged when electronic controls were flooded during Hurricane Sandy in 2012.

== Operations ==
The bridge is owned and operated by Atlantic County and is staffed full-time. Title 33 of the Code of Federal Regulations require it open on signal except from June 1 through September 30, between 9:15 a.m. to 9:15 p.m., when the draw need only open at 15 and 45 minutes after the hour.
