= Louise Todd Cope =

American artist (1930–2020)

- Born: Louise Moore Todd; June 17, 1930; Ventnor City, New Jersey, U.S.
- Died: February 2, 2020 (aged 89); South Toe Township, North Carolina, U.S.
- Other names: Louise Todd–Cope; Louise Moore; Louise M. Todd Cope
- Education: Syracuse University
- Occupations: Artist, educator, author
- Known for: Weaving, fabric art
- Spouse: Edward Todd
- Children: 3

Louise Todd Cope (née Louise Moore Todd; June 17, 1930 – February 2, 2020) was an American artist, educator, and poet. She was a noted weaver, and fabric artist.

== Biography ==
Louise Todd Cope was born in 1930 in Ventnor City, New Jersey, and raised outside Philadelphia. She studied at various universities nationally, including at Grinnell College, Syracuse University (1952 BFA degree), the University of Pennsylvania, University of North Carolina at Asheville, and Holy Names University.

Todd Cope taught textiles at Moore College of Art and Design in Philadelphia from 1970 to 1974; and summer classes at Starr King School for the Ministry in California, Haystack Mountain School of Crafts in Maine and Penland School of Craft in North Carolina. She volunteered for many years with the United Religions Initiative (URI), a grassroots interfaith network from San Francisco. Her textile work with URI was designed to inspire and support relationships between people from different faith backgrounds.

Todd Cope died on February 2, 2020, in South Toe Township, North Carolina.

Her work is included in the collections of the Smithsonian American Art Museum and the Philadelphia Museum of Art.
