= Essig (Swisttal) =

Coordinates: 50°39′30″N 6°53′12″E

Map
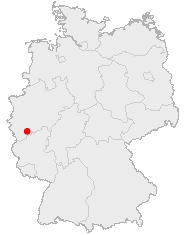

Essig is a village in the municipality of Swisttal in Rhein-Sieg district in the German state of North Rhine-Westphalia. It is situated approximately 18 km southwest of Bonn. In 2007 it had a population of 428. The village hall of the municipality of Swisttal is located between Essig and its neighbouring village, Ludendorf.
