= Pennsylvania House of Representatives, District 171 =

American legislative district

Pennsylvania's 171st State House of Representatives district
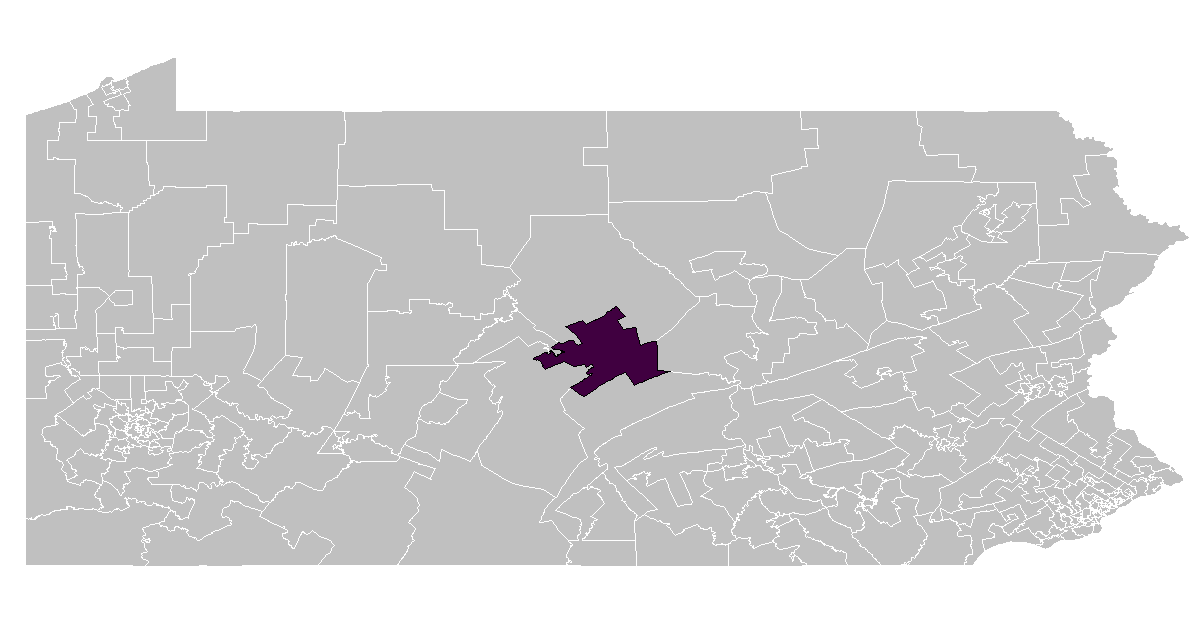
Representative
Kerry Benninghoff; R–Bellefonte

The 171st Pennsylvania House of Representatives District is located in Centre County and Mifflin County and includes the following areas:

- Centre County
  - Bellefonte
  - Centre Hall
  - College Township
  - Ferguson Township (PART)
    - District East
    - District North [PART, Divisions 01 and 03]
    - District West Central
  - Gregg Township
  - Harris Township
  - Millheim
- Centre County (continued)
  - Penn Township
  - Potter Township
  - Spring Township
  - Walker Township
- Mifflin County
  - Armagh Township
  - Brown Township
  - Decatur Township
  - Union Township

== Representatives ==
Representative	Party	Years	District home	Note
Prior to 1969, seats were apportioned by county.
Roland Greenfield	Democrat	1969 – 1982		
District moved from Philadelphia County to Centre & Mifflin Counties after 1982
Ruth C. Rudy	Democrat	1983 – 1996		
Kerry Benninghoff	Republican	1997 – present	Bellefonte	Incumbent
