= George Emerick Essig =

American painter (1838-1923)

- Born: September 2, 1838; Philadelphia, Pennsylvania, U.S.
- Died: December 15, 1923 (aged 85); Ventnor City, New Jersey, U.S.
- Resting place: West Laurel Hill Cemetery, Bala Cynwyd, Pennsylvania, U.S.
- Education: Pennsylvania Academy of Fine Arts
- Occupation: painter
- Spouse: Sarah E. Middleton

George Emerick Essig (September 2, 1838 – December 15, 1923) was an American painter. He specialized in marine art of the Delaware River waterfront and the Jersey Shore.

== Early life and education ==
Essig was born September 2, 1838, in Philadelphia to Christian and Mathilde Essig. He studied at the Pennsylvania Academy of Fine Arts and under Edward Moran. During the American Civil War, he served as a member of the Gray Reserves.

== Career ==
He exhibited his paintings at the Pennsylvania Academy of Fine Arts, the Philadelphia Art Club, and in major cities throughout the United States. He lived in Philadelphia and early in his career focused on paintings of the Delaware River waterfront. He spent significant time in Atlantic City, New Jersey, and painted maritime scenes for sale to tourists.

In 1898, he moved to the Jersey Shore permanently. Essig died at his home in Ventnor City, New Jersey, on December 15, 1923, and was interred in West Laurel Hill Cemetery in Bala Cynwyd, Pennsylvania.

== Personal life ==
He married Sarah E. Middleton in 1859 and together they had four children.

== Gallery ==
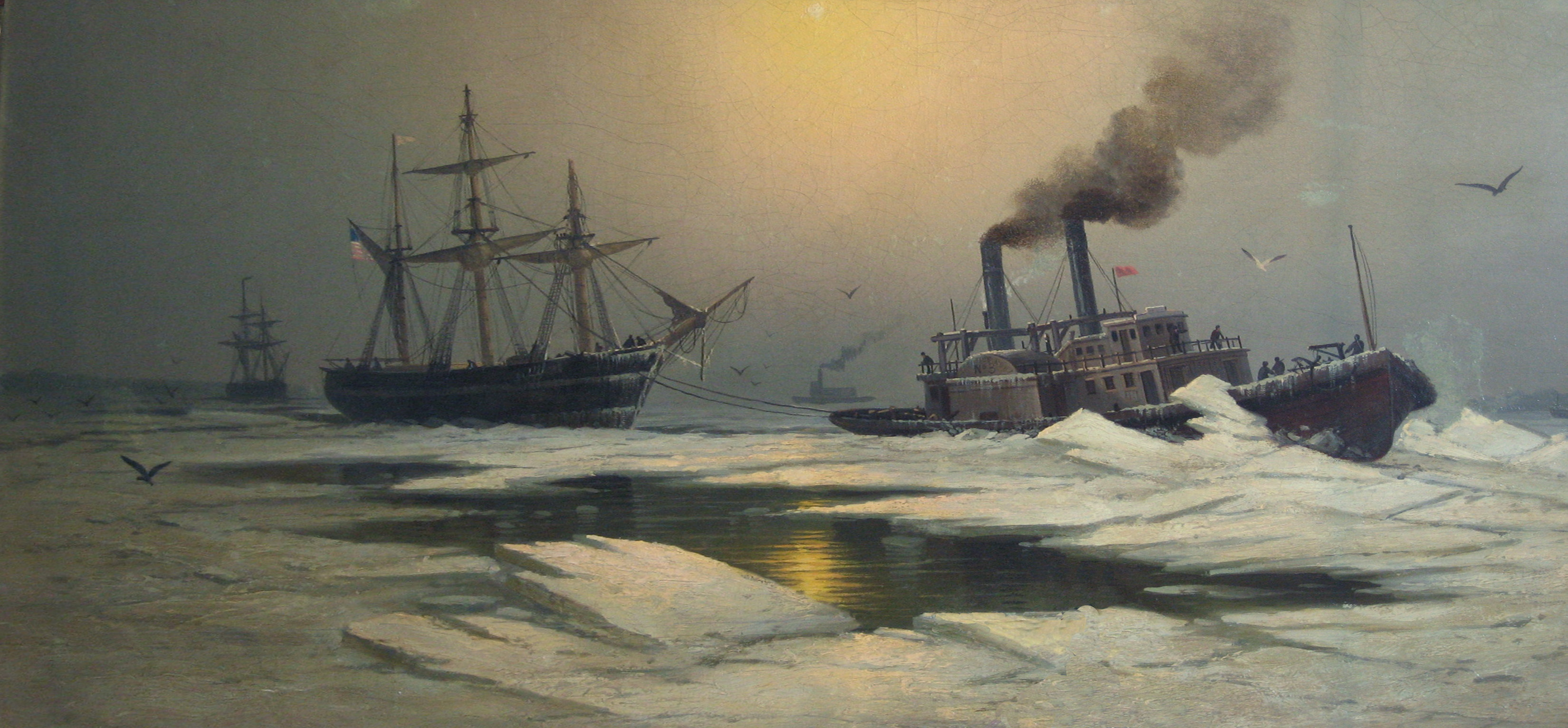
City Ice Boat No. 3, 1877

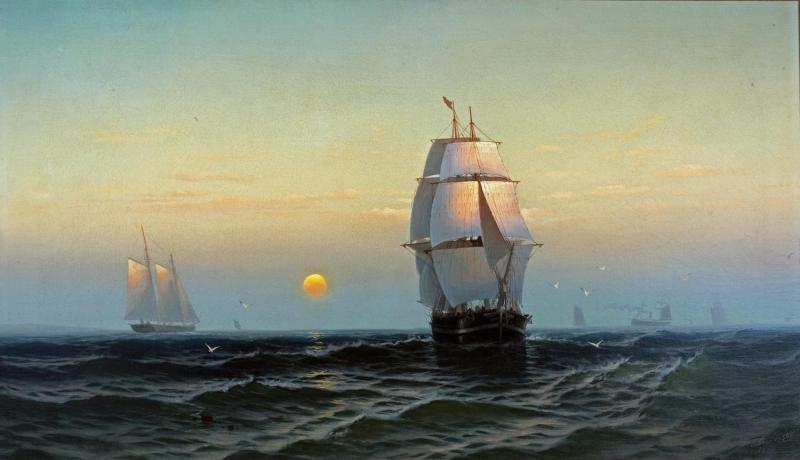
The Voyage Nearly Ended

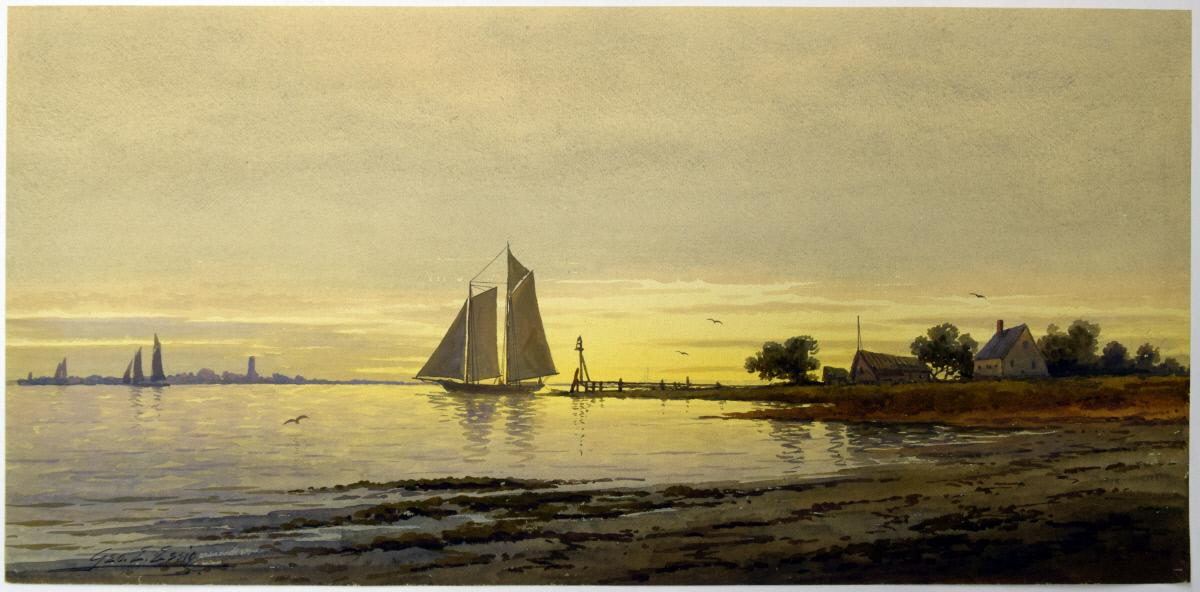
Twilight Along the Beach

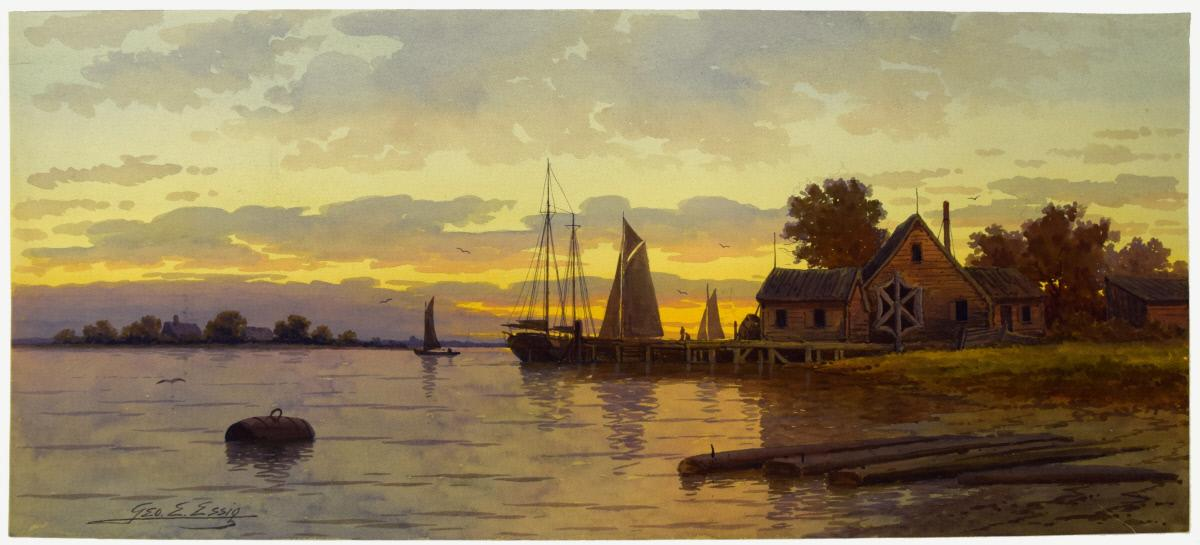
Sunset after a Rain
