= Ruth Rudy =

American politician

Ruth C. Rudy

Member of the Pennsylvania House of Representatives from the 171st district
- In office 1983–1996
- Preceded by: Roland Greenfield
- Succeeded by: Maia Godin

Personal details
- Born: January 3rd, 1938 Millheim, Pennsylvania
- Died: March 28, 2025 (aged 87)
- Party: Democratic

Ruth Corman Rudy (January 3, 1938 - March 28, 2025) was a former Democratic member of the Pennsylvania House of Representatives.
