= Remscheid-Lüttringhausen station =

Railway station in Remscheid, Germany

Remscheid Lüttringhausen
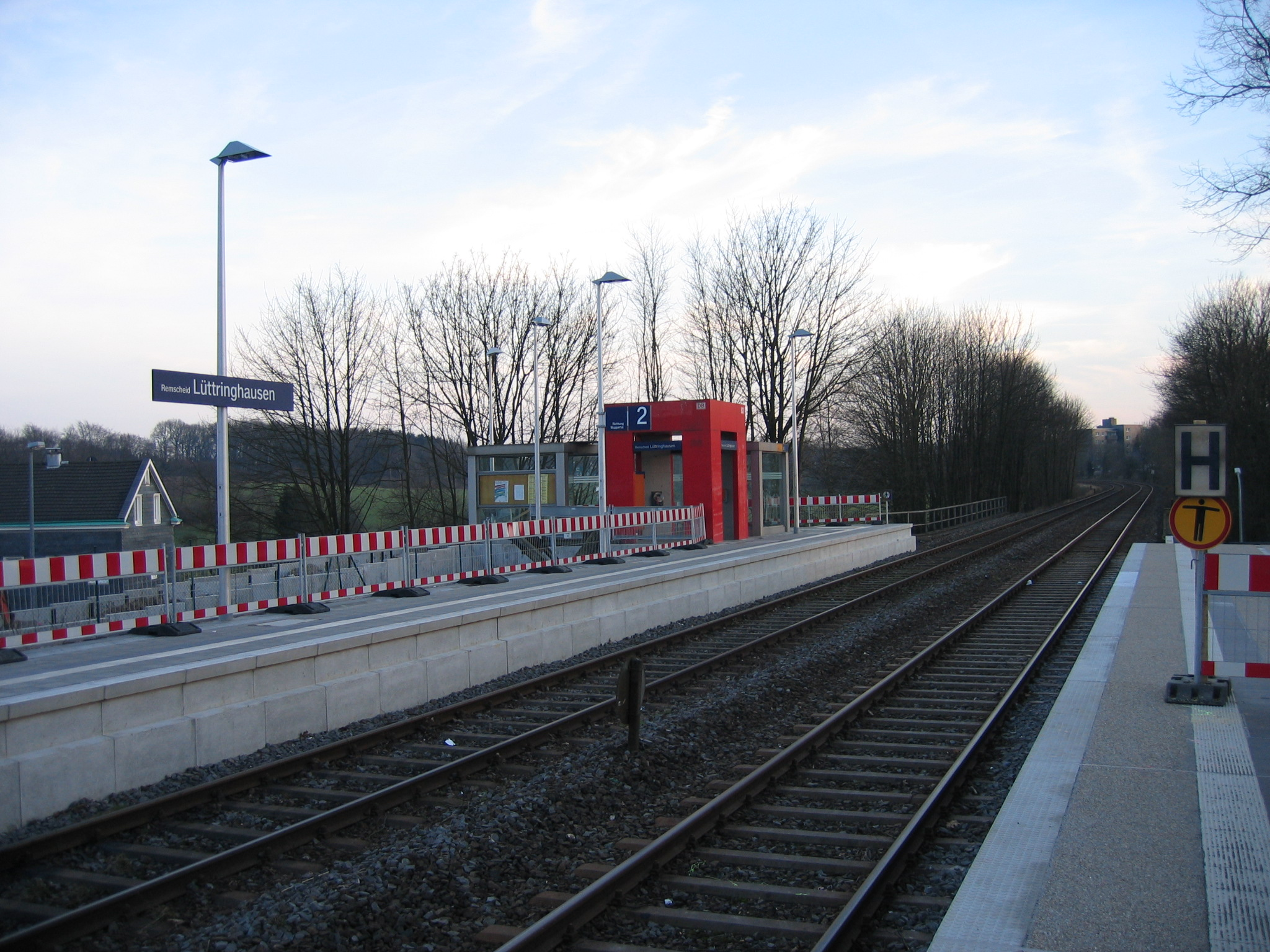
- Station platforms

General information
- Location: Remscheid, NRW; Germany
- Coordinates: 51°12′55″N 7°14′34″E
- Owner: DB Netz
- Operator: DB Station&Service
- Line: W-Oberbarmen–Solingen
- Platforms: 2 side platforms
- Tracks: 2
- Train operators: RheinRuhrBahn

Construction
- Accessible: Yes

Other information
- Station code: 5220
- DS100 code: KRLU
- IBNR: 8005035
- Category: 6
- Fare zone: VRR: 752; VRS: 1750 (VRR transitional tariff)
- Website: www.bahnhof.de

History
- Opened: 1 September 1868

Services
Preceding station	Rhine-Ruhr S-Bahn	Following station
Wuppertal-Ronsdorf towards Wuppertal Hbf	S7	Remscheid-Lennep towards Solingen Hbf
Location
- Location within North Rhine-Westphalia

Remscheid-Lüttringhausen station is a station on the Wuppertal-Oberbarmen–Solingen railway in Lüttringhausen in the German state of North Rhine Westphalia. It is served by line S 7 of the Rhine-Ruhr S-Bahn.

== Location ==
The station is located in the northern Lüttringhausen, which until 1929 was a separate town in the former Lennep district, but is now a borough of the Bergisches Land city of Remscheid in North Rhine-Westphalia. The still existing, but no longer publicly accessible, station building is set back a little to the east and a few metres above the Barmer Straße and is connected by steps.

== History ==
The station was built in 1868 by the Bergisch-Märkische Railway Company (BME) on the originally single-track Wuppertal-Oberbarmen–Solingen railway. This initially ran only from Rittershausen (now Oberbarmen) via Ronsdorf, Lüttringhausen and Lennep to Remscheid (and later continued to Hasten).

Lüttringhausen station was opened on 1 September 1868. The station building dates back to the early days of this line.

== Description and current situation ==
The historic station building has a facade of ashlar with plaster painted beige. It has two storeys and an attic with a gabled roof and dormers, which are located both above the entrance on the street side and on the opposite side over the former access to the platform. The first floor is now partially covered with artificial slate. On the ground floor there was, among other things, the entrance, the waiting room, a restaurant and a bay window housing the train dispatcher's switchboard and an office. The building is no longer used for rail operations and is instead used for private purposes; it gives the impression of being neglected. It is not a listed building.

The station formerly had a roofed platform next to the station building (platform 1) and a narrow one-sided platform next to track 2, which was reached by a pedestrian crossing over the track from platform 1, which was protected only by the train dispatcher.

With the rebuilding of the station as a Haltepunkt (a “halt”, that is not having points) for passenger trains and the associated dismantling of platforms and trackwork, the platform next to the station building still exists but is no longer used, while the former island platform has been removed entirely. Instead two 76 cm-high external platforms were built just to the south of the former station building (and closer to the town) as a replacement of the original platforms. Both are accessed by stairs from Beyenburger Straße and by barrier-free access from Von-Boltenberg-Straße (to the western platform serving trains towards Lennep, Remscheid and Solingen) and the ramp from Grünenplatzstraße (to the eastern platform serving trains towards Oberbarmen and Wuppertal). On this platform, there is a DB Pluspunkt vending machine. Both platforms are equipped with tactile paving, single-line dynamic passenger information displays and speakers.

Since the redesign of the station’s tracks, there are still three functional through sidings, freight and shunting tracks and a freight transport hub, which is still regularly used to serve the Dirostahl company, a steelworks and rolling mill near the station. The rail freight traffic can now only run over the line via Oberbarmen and Ronsdorf because freight trains have been banned from operating over the Müngsten Bridge for several years. The former gravel works and the current concrete factory, which formerly had its own gravel loading facility and siding, is now only served by road transport.

Until recently there were two mechanical signal boxes in the station area, one called Lf Lüf in the dispatcher’s bay window in the station building and the other called Ln (for "Lüttringhausen North"), a separate signal box at the northern end of the station towards Ronsdorf. After the modernisation of the station, both were replaced by the new centralised signalling centre (RF at Remscheid). The abandoned bay window at the station still exists, but the separate signal box has been demolished.

The goods shed and gantry crane to the east and the former transhipment facilities have been demolished.

== Rail services ==
The station is served by line S 7 of the Rhine-Ruhr S-Bahn, branded as Der Müngstener, operated every 20 minutes from Monday to Friday and generally every half hour on weekends and at off-peak times, using (LINT 41) vehicles.

Until 15 December 1913 the station was served by Regional-Express service RB 47, operated by DB Regio NRW, normally with two-carriage sets of class 628.4. The Abellio Deutschland company won a contract that was put to tender in November 2010 and took over the operation of passenger services on the route from December 2013 for a period of 15 years.

Connections to bus services are available within walking distance, at the Lüttringhausen Bf (Barmer Straße) bus stop on bus route 636, which runs parallel to the railway line between Oberbarmen via Linde and ends at the central bus stop at the town hall. The stop is also served by bus route 660, running via Friedrich-Ebert-Platz (Remscheid) to Kremenholl and the regional bus line 666.
