= Wuppertal-Ronsdorf station =

Railway station in Wuppertal, Germany

Wuppertal Ronsdorf
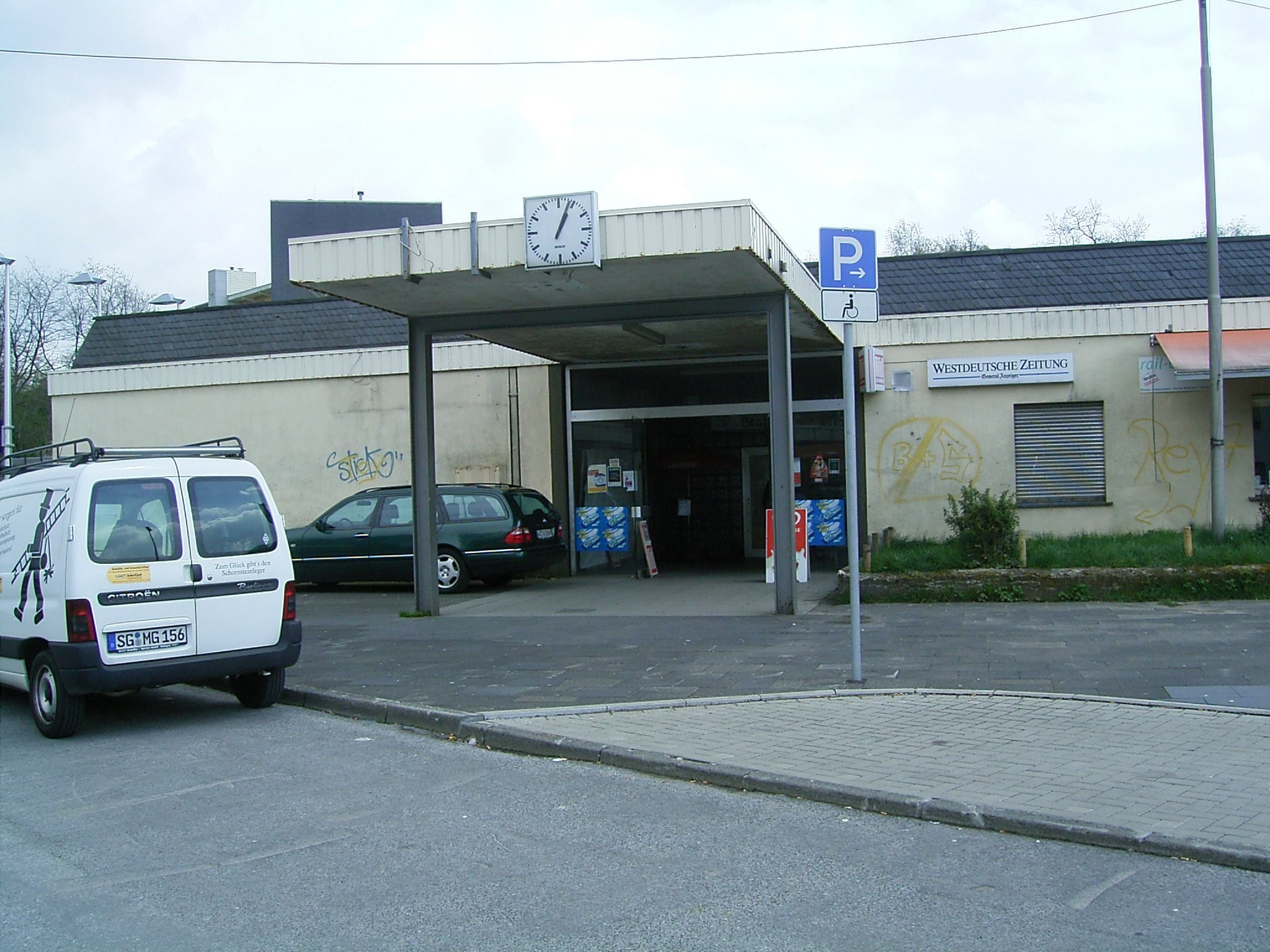

General information
- Location: Nibelungenstr. 80, Wuppertal, NRW; Germany
- Coordinates: 51°13′35″N 7°12′56″E
- Owner: DB Netz
- Operator: DB Station&Service
- Lines: W-Oberbarmen–Solingen (KBS 458)
- Platforms: 1 island platform
- Tracks: 3
- Train operators: Abellio Rail NRW

Construction
- Accessible: Yes

Other information
- Station code: 6932
- DS100 code: KWRO
- IBNR: 8006616
- Category: 5
- Fare zone: VRR: 668; VRS: 1660 (VRR transitional tariff)
- Website: www.bahnhof.de

History
- Opened: 1 September 1868

Services
Preceding station	Rhine-Ruhr S-Bahn	Following station
Wuppertal-Oberbarmen towards Wuppertal Hbf	S7	Remscheid-Lüttringhausen towards Solingen Hbf
Location
- Location within North Rhine-Westphalia

Wuppertal-Ronsdorf station is a station on the Wuppertal-Oberbarmen–Solingen railway in the German state of North Rhine-Westphalia. It is classified by Deutsche Bahn as a category 5 station. It is unusual in that it was once connected to lines with three different gauges.

== Location ==
The station is located at the end of Nibelungenstraße in the Wuppertal district of Ronsdorf about 1.2 kilometres east of its centre at an altitude of 295 metres above sea level. Since the 1970s, it has been connected to the residential area of Rehsiepen, located east of the station, by a pedestrian bridge over the station's tracks.

== History ==
During the construction of the Rittershausen–Remscheid line, a route was originally considered that would have run further west through Erbschlö and closer to central Ronsdorf. Topographic conditions led to the current route finally being selected; this runs through the hamlet of Blombach to the site of the station and continues along the Tannenbaumer Weg towards Lüttringhausen, Lennep and Remscheid.

The station was opened at the same time as the line to Remscheid on 1 September 1868.

=== The Ronsdorf-Müngsten Railway ===
The Ronsdorf-Müngsten Railway (German: Ronsdorf-Müngstener Eisenbahn, RME) was built from 1890 as a metre gauge line to improve links with Ronsdorf and numerous metalworking companies in the Morsbach valley. The section from Stadtbahnhof ("City station"), which was adjacent to Wuppertal-Ronsdorf station, to Ronsdorf station was inaugurated on 28 May 1891. As early as 21 August 1891 the RME was extended to Clarenbach and on 16 November 1891 it was completed to Müngsten. The line was electrified in 1903. It was closed in stages up until 1959.

Stadtbahnhof was renamed as Wuppertal-Ronsdorf station in 1949.

=== Three gauges ===
In addition to the standard-gauge state railway and the metre-gauge RME, a narrow-gauge light railway network was built on the immediately adjacent brickyard site. The brickyard tracks are long gone. Today the site is used for the workshops of the cable manufacturer Draka. The escarpment of the pit used for the extraction of the raw material for brick making is still easily recognised.

== Current situation ==
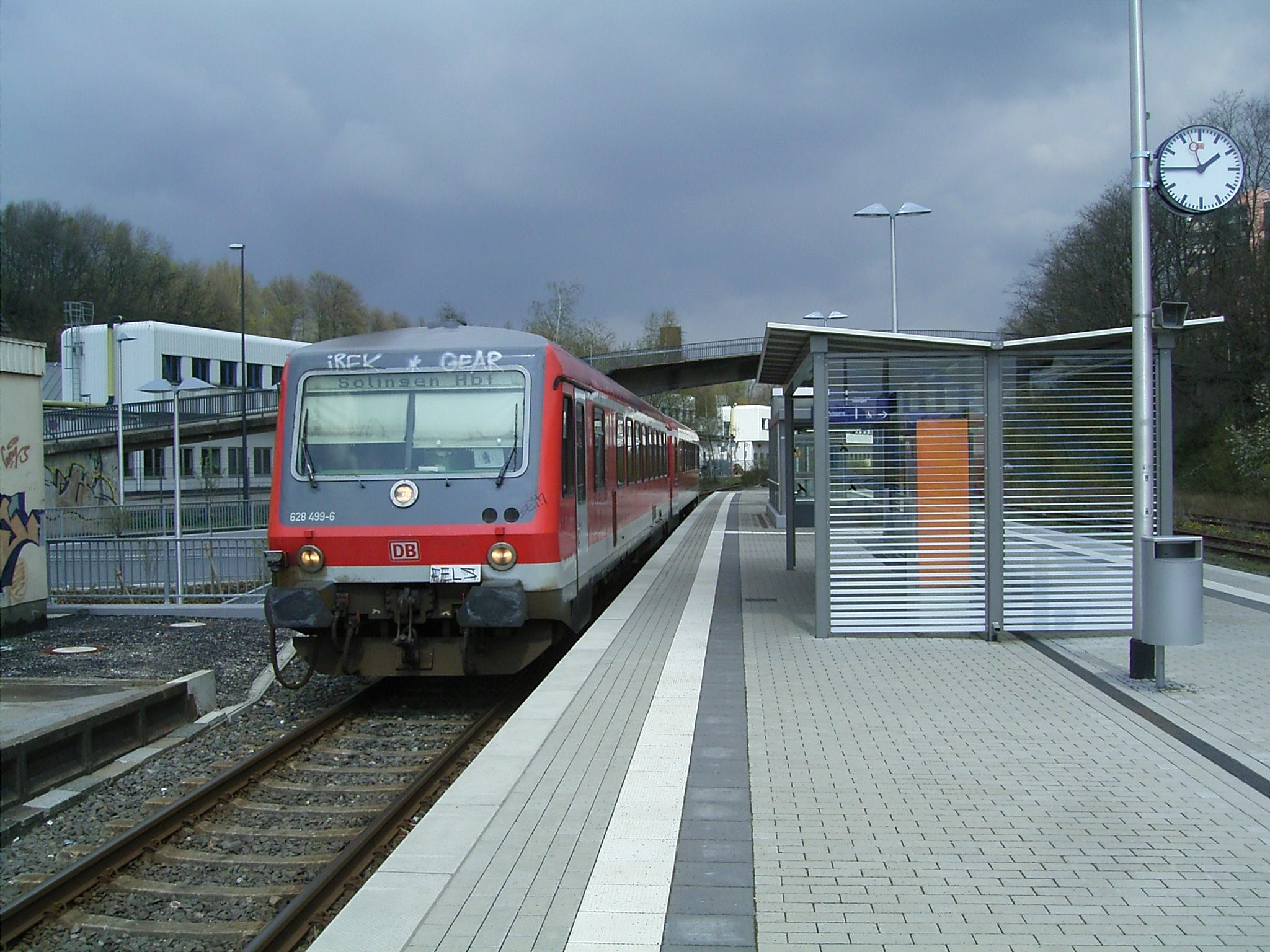
Der Müngstener in the station

The austere entrance building that was built in the 1960s, replacing the original 19th-century building, no longer has any rail functions, but only houses a kiosk. During the reconstruction of the station in 2006–2007, the central platform was raised to 76 cm and the station entrance was made accessible for the disabled by means of a ramp and a lift, or alternatively via stairs. Both the old platform roof with its cast iron columns and the old underpass to the former station building have disappeared.

The freight yard building is used as a warehouse and the freight hall of the RME, which was also built of timber construction, is still preserved. The loading dock, like the former home platform of the passenger station, has been abandoned for several years. East of the platforms tracks, there are two other tracks, only occasionally used as through-tracks, which are sometimes used for the parking of freight vehicles. The switches and signals are controlled from the interlocking at Remscheid. The remaining sidings, such as to the factory premises of the Draka company, are used only occasionally. On the site of the former transfer station to the RME (in the southern part of the station area) there is now a scrap metal recycler.

The station is served by line S7 of the Rhine-Ruhr S-Bahn (Der Müngstener), which operates at 20-minute intervals, Mondays to Fridays, and every half-hour on weekends.

The station is also served by city bus line 620 towards Ronsdorf-Markt/Elberfeld and Klausen/Lüttringhausen.
