= Solingen Mitte station =

Railway station in Solingen, Germany

Solingen-Mitte
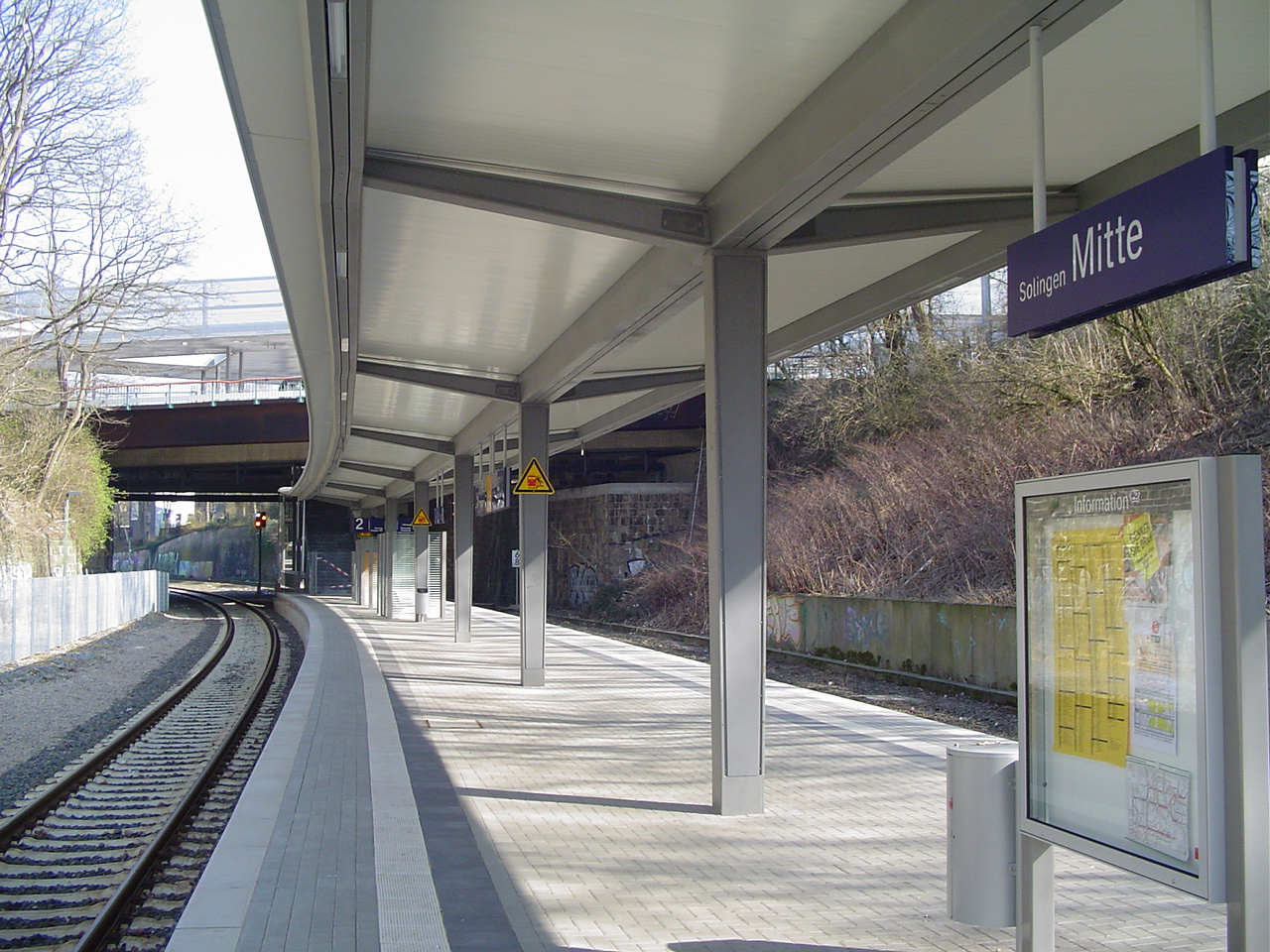
- 2007

General information
- Location: Solingen, NRW; Germany
- Coordinates: 51°09′58″N 7°05′22″E
- Owner: DB Netz
- Operator: DB Station&Service
- Lines: W-Oberbarmen–Solingen (KBS 458)
- Platforms: 1 island platform
- Tracks: 2
- Train operators: RheinRuhrBahn

Construction
- Accessible: Yes

Other information
- Station code: 5414
- DS100 code: KSM
- IBNR: 8005598
- Category: 5
- Fare zone: VRR: 740; VRS: 1740 (VRR transitional tariff)
- Website: www.bahnhof.de

History
- Opened: 10 December 2006

Services
Preceding station	Regiobahn	Following station
Remscheid Hbf towards Remscheid-Lennep	RE 47	Solingen-Grünewald towards Düsseldorf Hbf
Preceding station	Rhine-Ruhr S-Bahn	Following station
Solingen-Schaberg towards Wuppertal Hbf	S7	Solingen Grünewald towards Solingen Hbf
Location
- Location within North Rhine-Westphalia

Solingen Mitte station is in the city of Solingen in the German state of North Rhine-Westphalia. It is on the Wuppertal-Oberbarmen–Solingen railway. The line through the site of Solingen Mitte station was opened on 2 December 1890 as part of the Solingen–Wuppertal-Vohwinkel line, known as the Korkenzieherbahn ("Corkscrew Railway"), to Vohwinkel. The station was opened on 10 December 2006. It is classified by Deutsche Bahn as a category 5 station.

The station is served by line S 7 of the Rhine-Ruhr S-Bahn, branded as Der Müngstener, operated every 20 minutes from Monday to Friday and generally every half hour on weekends and at off-peak times, using (LINT 41) vehicles. Until 15 December 2013 the station was served by Regional-Express service RB 47, operated by DB Regio NRW, normally with two-carriage sets of class 628.4. The Abellio Deutschland company won a contract that was put to tender in November 2010 and took over the operation of passenger services on the route from December 2013 for a period of 15 years.

Since December of 2022, the Station is also served hourly by regional service RE 47 between Düsseldorf Hauptbahnhof and Remscheid-Lennep, operated by Regiobahn.
