= Remscheid-Güldenwerth station =

Railway station in Remscheid, Germany

Remscheid Güldenwerth
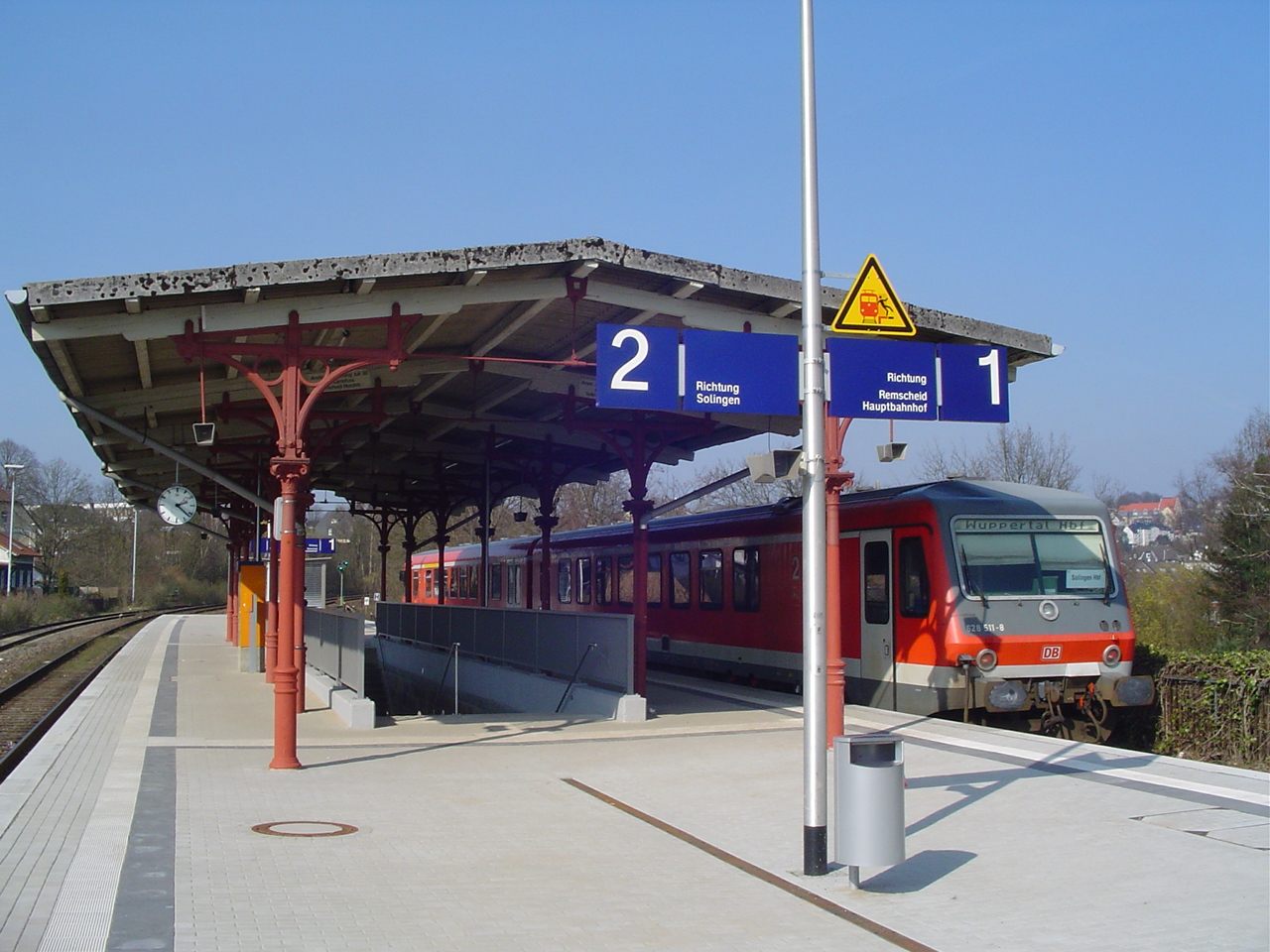

General information
- Location: Remscheid, NRW; Germany
- Coordinates: 51°10′09″N 7°09′46″E
- Line: W-Oberbarmen–Solingen
- Platforms: 1

Construction
- Accessible: No

Other information
- Station code: 5218
- DS100 code: KRG
- IBNR: 8005034
- Category: 6
- Fare zone: VRR: 750; VRS: 1750 (VRR transitional tariff)
- Website: www.bahnhof.de

History
- Opened: 1 August 1898

Services
Preceding station	Rhine-Ruhr S-Bahn	Following station
Remscheid Hbf towards Wuppertal Hbf	S7	Solingen-Schaberg towards Solingen Hbf
Location

Remscheid-Güldenwerth station is a station on the Wuppertal-Oberbarmen–Solingen railway in the Remscheid district of Güldenwerth in the German state of North Rhine Westphalia. It is served by line S 7 of the Rhine-Ruhr S-Bahn, branded as Der Müngstener, operated every 20 minutes from Monday to Friday and generally every half-hour on weekends and at off-peak times, using (LINT 41) vehicles.

Until 15 December 1913 the station was served by Regional-Express service RB 47, operated by DB Regio NRW, normally with two-carriage sets of class 628.4. The Abellio Deutschland company won a contract that was put to tender in November 2010 and took over the operation of passenger services on the route from December 2013 for a period of 15 years.

The station is served by bus route 654 (Reinshagen – Remscheid - Lennep - Lüttringhausen - Klausen) at 20-minute intervals and route 648 (Morsbach (- Müngsten) – Remscheid - Falkenberg) at 60-minute intervals, both operated by Stadtwerke Remscheid.
