= Solingen Grünewald station =

Railway station in Solingen, Germany

Solingen Grünewald
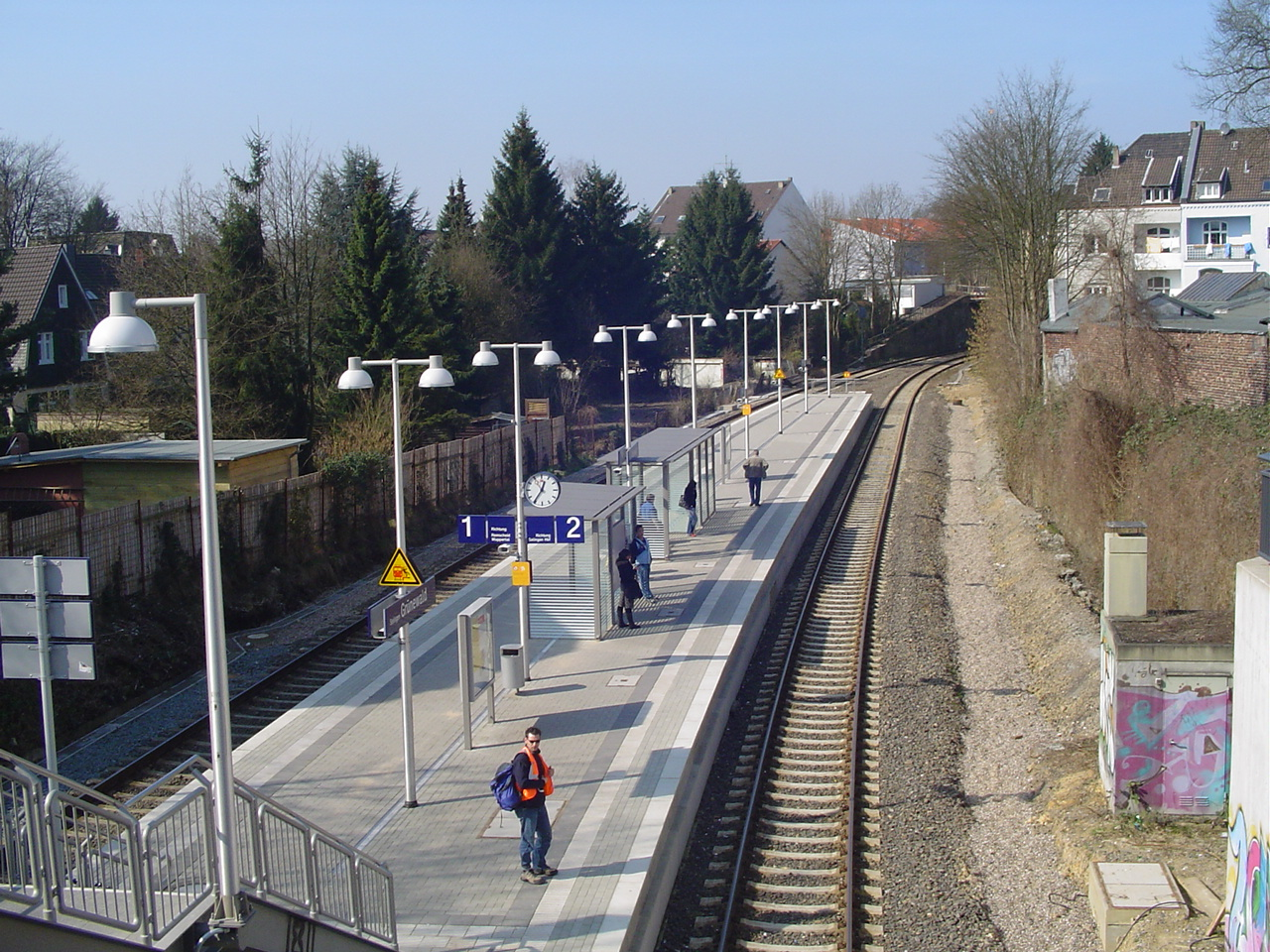
- 2007

General information
- Location: Solingen, NRW; Germany
- Coordinates: 51°09′50″N 7°04′46″E
- Owner: DB Netz
- Operator: DB Station&Service
- Lines: W-Oberbarmen–Solingen (KBS 458)
- Platforms: 1 island platform
- Tracks: 2
- Train operators: RheinRuhrBahn

Construction
- Accessible: Yes

Other information
- Station code: 5778
- DS100 code: KSGR
- IBNR: 8005597
- Category: 3
- Fare zone: VRR: 740; VRS: 1740 (VRR transitional tariff)
- Website: www.bahnhof.de

History
- Opened: 6 May 2006

Services
| Preceding station | Regiobahn | Following station |
|---|---|---|
| Solingen Mitte towards Remscheid-Lennep | RE 47 | Solingen Hbf towards Düsseldorf Hbf |
| Preceding station | Rhine-Ruhr S-Bahn | Following station |
| Solingen Mitte towards Wuppertal Hbf | S7 | Solingen Hbf Terminus |
Location
- Location within North Rhine-Westphalia

Solingen Grünewald station is in the city of Solingen in the German state of North Rhine-Westphalia. It is on the Wuppertal-Oberbarmen–Solingen railway. The line through the site of Solingen Grünewald station was opened on 12 February 1890 as part of the Solingen–Wuppertal-Vohwinkel line, known as the Korkenzieherbahn ("Corkscrew Railway"), to Vohwinkel. The station was opened on 6 May 2006. It is classified by Deutsche Bahn as a category 3 station.

The station is served by line S 7 of the Rhine-Ruhr S-Bahn, branded as Der Müngstener, operated every 20 minutes from Monday to Friday and generally every half hour on weekends and at off-peak times, using (LINT 41) vehicles. Until 15 December 2013 the station was served by Regional-Express service RB 47, operated by DB Regio NRW, normally with two-carriage sets of class 628.4. The Abellio Deutschland company won a contract that was put to tender in November 2010 and took over the operation of passenger services on the route from December 2013 for a period of 15 years.

Since December 2022, the Station is also served hourly by regional service RE 47 between Düsseldorf Hauptbahnhof and Remscheid-Lennep, operated by Regiobahn.

It is served by a trolleybus line operated by Stadtwerke Solingen at 10-minute intervals. Stadtwerke Solingen also operates bus route 699 through the station six times a day. The station is served every 60 minutes by bus route 250 operated by Wiedenhoff.
