= Solingen-Schaberg station =

Railway station in Solingen, Germany

Solingen Schaberg
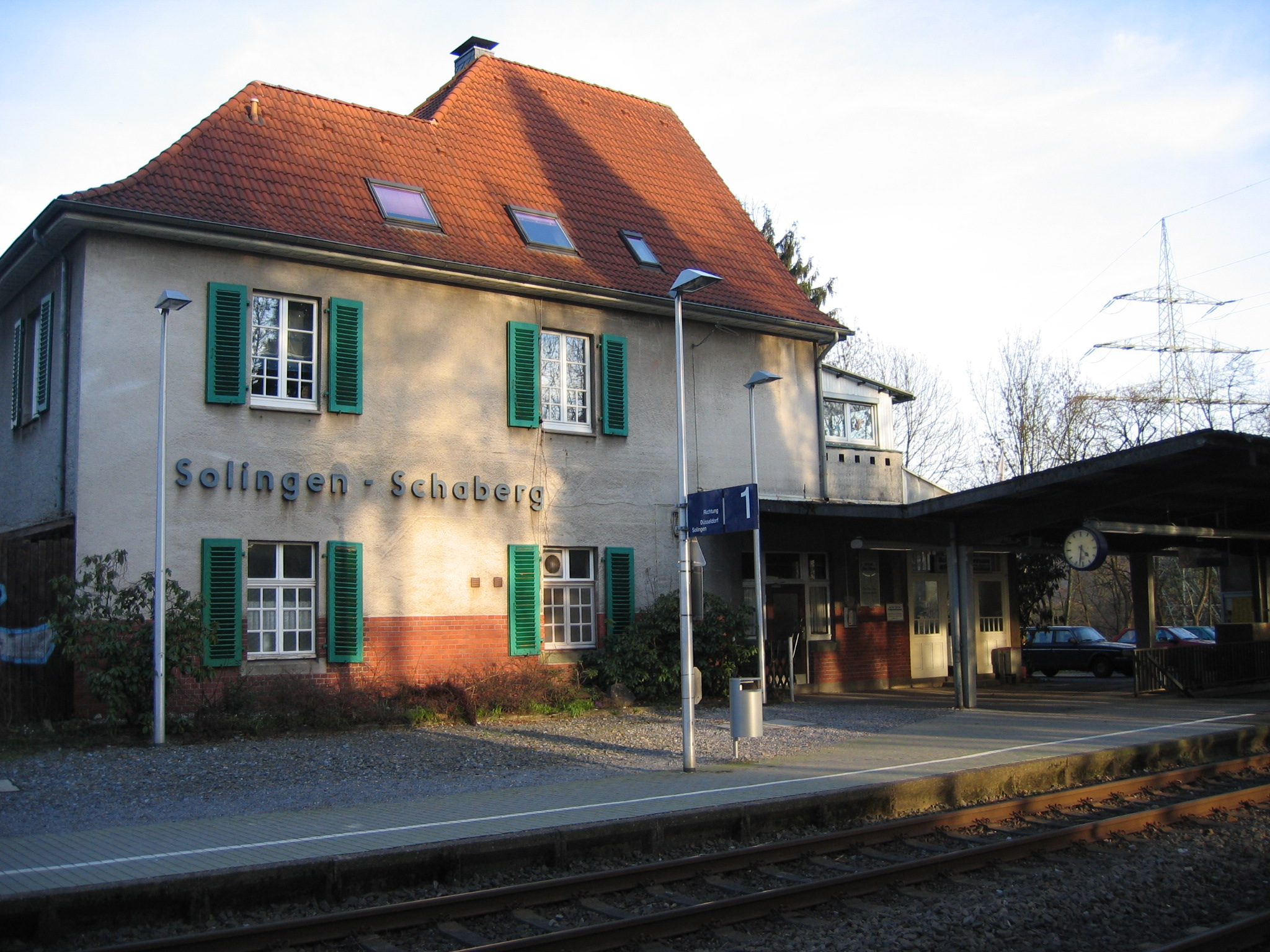
- 2007

General information
- Location: Solingen, NRW; Germany
- Coordinates: 51°09′47″N 7°07′42″E
- Owner: DB Netz
- Operator: DB Station&Service
- Line: Wuppertal-Oberbarmen–Solingen
- Platforms: 2 side platforms
- Tracks: 2
- Train operators: RheinRuhrBahn

Construction
- Accessible: Platform 1 only

Other information
- Station code: 5883
- DS100 code: KSS
- IBNR: 8005590
- Category: 6
- Fare zone: VRR: 740; VRS: 1740 (VRR transitional tariff)
- Website: www.bahnhof.de

History
- Opened: 15 July 1897

Services
Preceding station	Rhine-Ruhr S-Bahn	Following station
Remscheid-Güldenwerth towards Wuppertal Hbf	S7	Solingen Mitte towards Solingen Hbf
Location

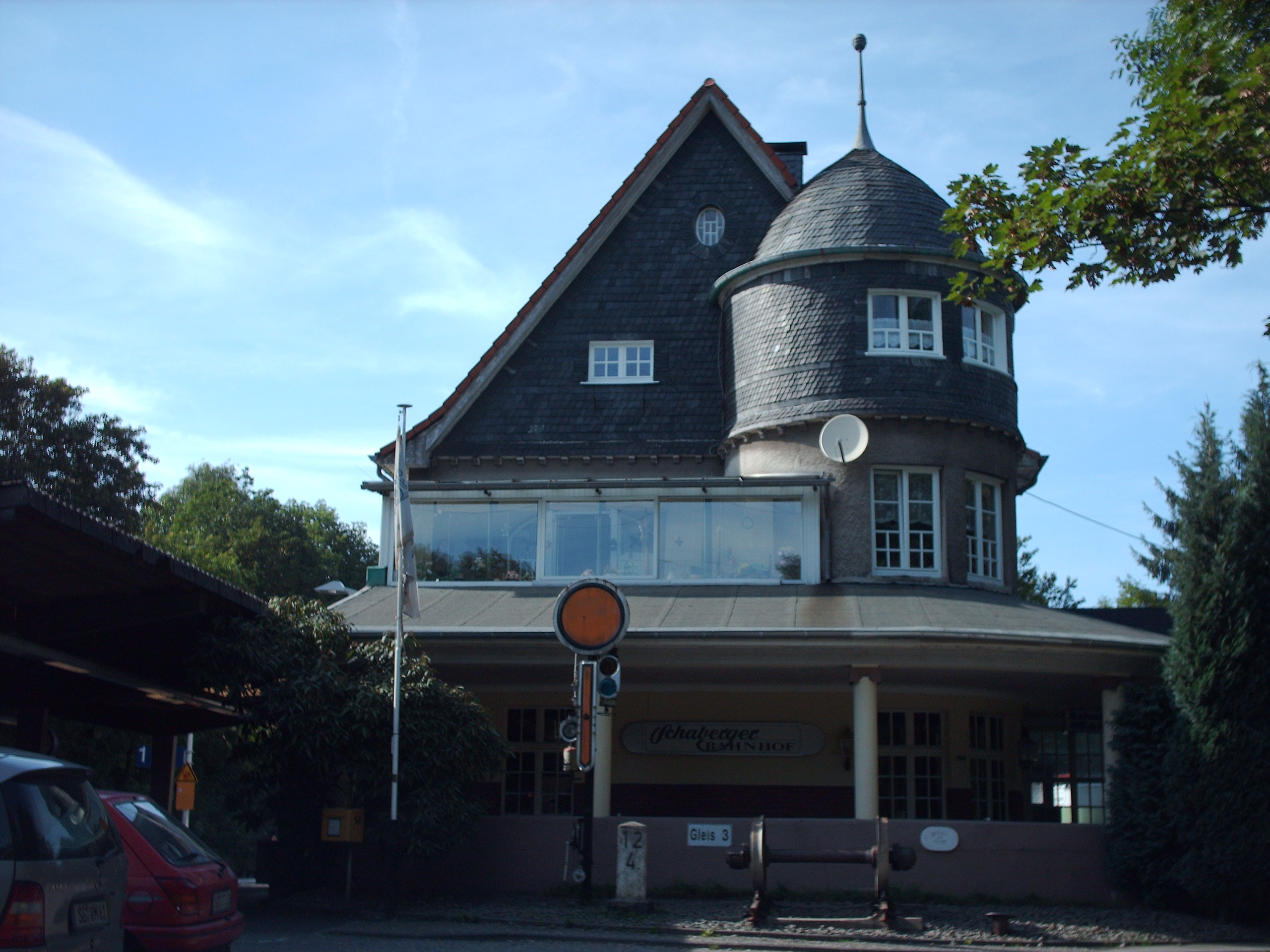

Solingen-Schaberg station is a station on the Wuppertal-Oberbarmen–Solingen railway in the Solingen district of Schaberg in the German state of North Rhine Westphalia. It is served by line S 7 of the Rhine-Ruhr S-Bahn, branded as Der Müngstener, operated every 20 minutes from Monday to Friday and generally every half hour on weekends and at off-peak times, using (LINT 41) vehicles.

Until 15 December 2013, the station was served by Regional-Express service RB 47, operated by DB Regio NRW, normally with two-carriage sets of class 628.4. The Abellio Deutschland company won a contract that was put to tender in November 2010 and took over the operation of passenger services on the route from December 2013 for a period of 15 years.
