= Remscheid Hauptbahnhof =

Railway station in Remscheid, Germany

Remscheid Hbf
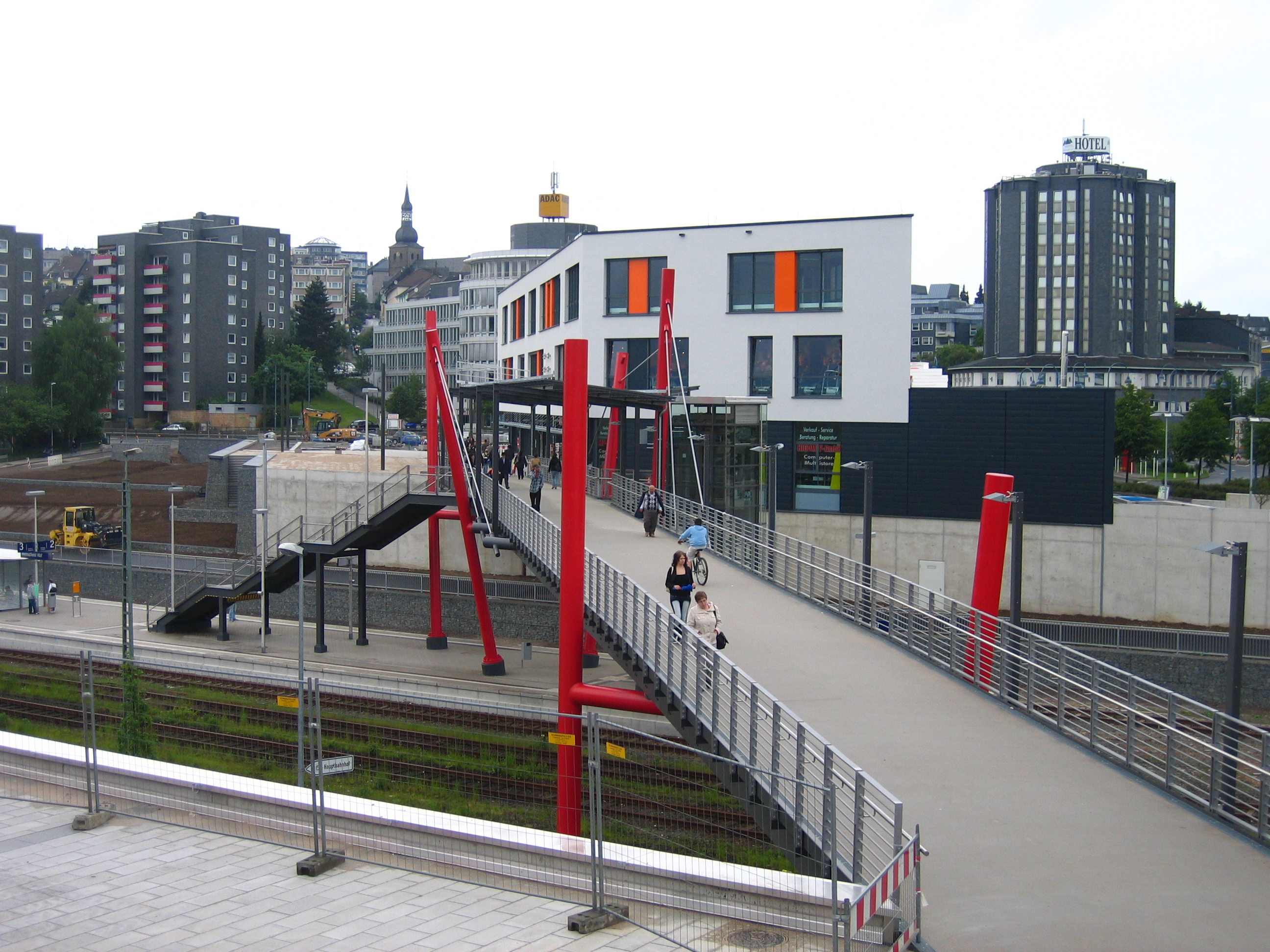
- 2009

General information
- Location: Willy-Brandt-Platz 1 Remscheid, NRW; Germany
- Coordinates: 51°10′36″N 7°11′56″E
- Owner: DB Netz
- Operator: DB Station&Service
- Lines: W-Oberbarmen–Solingen (KBS 458)
- Platforms: 1 island platform
- Tracks: 5
- Train operators: Abellio Rail NRW

Construction
- Accessible: Yes

Other information
- Station code: 5217
- DS100 code: KR
- IBNR: 8005033
- Category: 5
- Fare zone: VRR: 750; VRS: 1750 (VRR transitional tariff)
- Website: www.bahnhof.de

History
- Opened: 1 September 1868

Services
Preceding station	Regiobahn	Following station
Remscheid-Lennep Terminus	RE 47	Solingen Mitte towards Düsseldorf Hbf
Preceding station	Rhine-Ruhr S-Bahn	Following station
Remscheid-Lennep towards Wuppertal Hbf	S7	Remscheid-Güldenwerth towards Solingen Hbf
Location
- Location within North Rhine-Westphalia

Remscheid Hauptbahnhof is a railway station in the Bergisch city of Remscheid in the German state of North Rhine-Westphalia. It is located in Willy-Brandt-Platz near central Remscheid and is classified by Deutsche Bahn as a category 5 station. Remscheid and Gevelsberg Hauptbahnhof are the only Hauptbahnhof stations in Germany to be served only by S-Bahn trains.

== History ==
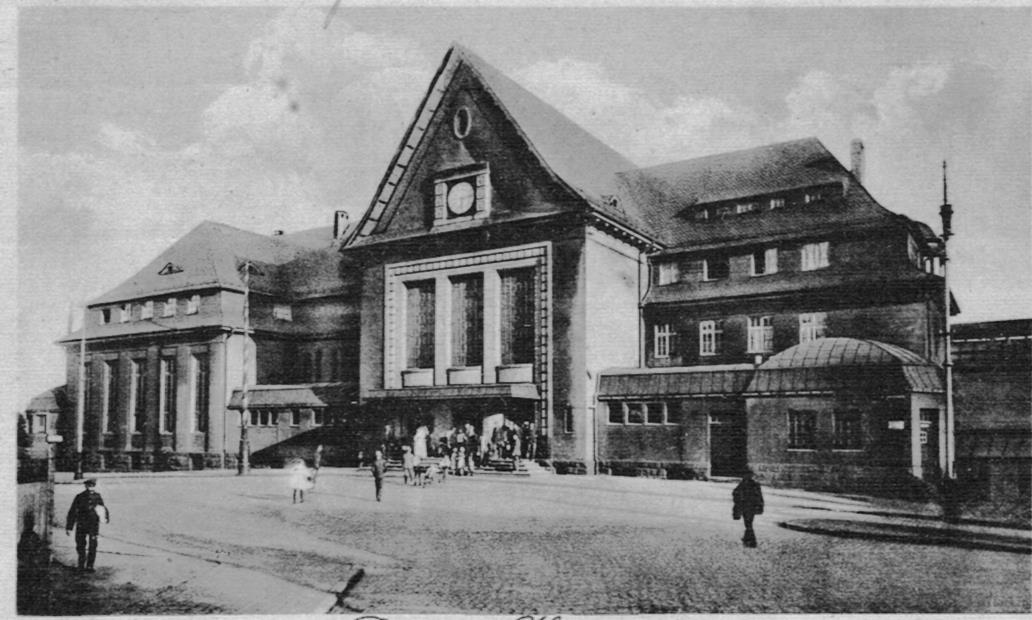
(about 1925)

On 1 September 1868, the Bergisch-Märkische Railway Company (Bergisch-Märkische Eisenbahn-Gesellschaft) opened the first section of the Rittershausen–Opladen line from Oberbarmen (then called Rittershausen) to Lennep, together with a branch line to Remscheid, giving the city its first rail connection. Remscheid station (now called Remscheid Hauptbahnhof) and its attached buildings were built of timber.

A branch line to Hasten was opened on 1 September 1883, and the Lennep–Remscheid line was duplicated up to 1891. Five years later, a branch to Bliedinghausen was added, but has only ever been used for freight.

As part of the construction of the line to Bliedinghausen the platforms were modified. Passenger trains to Hasten previously ran from their own terminal platform west of the station building. The sidings located east of Bismarckstraße later became the Remscheid East yard, which was connected to the station by a four track bridge over Bismarckstraße in 1900.

During the construction of the connecting line to Solingen via Güldenwerth over the Müngsten Bridge the locomotive depot was closed due to lack of space in early 1896 and locomotive maintenance was transferred to the depot in nearby Lennep.

In 1897 the gap between Solingen Süd and Remscheid was finally closed and in 1907 the route was duplicated. Thus Remscheid station now had rail connections in four directions (and also via Lennep towards Opladen). On 10 August 1911, a formal station building made of stone was inaugurated, replacing the existing building, which was called the Zigarrenkiste ("cigar box") because of its limited space. The line to Hasten ended again at a bay platform to the west of the station building. The main two tracks ran between a central platform and a "home" platform (next to the station building), connected by a pedestrian bridge and a tunnel for the railway post office. The new building included a rebuilt section of the hall of Elberfeld-Döppersberg station (which was closed in 1848 when Wuppertal Hauptbahnhof opened). Freight operations were moved in 1911 to the southern side of the station’s track field.

Until 1911, the station forecourt was called An der Quatsche; it was called Adolf Müller-Strasse during the Third Reich.

In 1914, Remscheid station was renamed Remscheid Hauptbahnhof to emphasise its importance as the most important station in the city of Remscheid. In 1922 passenger services to Hasten were discontinued. Freight traffic continued with general freight traffic to Hasten and Vieringhausen freight yards as well as wagon-load traffic to ten sidings of industrial enterprises. Freight operations closed to Hasten in 1986 and to Vieringhausen in 1988; the line was officially closed on 31 December 1990. The line was dismantled between March 1993 and September 1996. In 2006 the line was reconstructed as the Trasse des Werkzeugs ("tool path").

The importance of Remscheid station was always less than the nearby Lennep station, which became the most important station when Lennep was incorporated into Remscheid in 1929.

On 28 April 1974, centralised interlocking was opened at the southwestern end of the railway land next to the Papenberger Straße level crossing.

=== Refurbishment ===
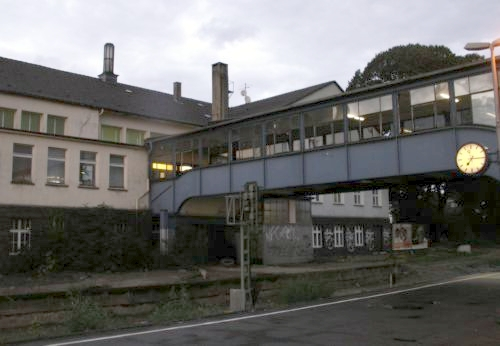
Old station

After the destruction of the war, the station was rebuilt in a simplified a form on the remaining foundation and on 14 August 1956, the entrance building was re-inaugurated. Only the most necessary work was carried out on the railway, the condition of which continued to deteriorate. As part of Regionale 2006 (a regional development program of Remscheid, Solingen and Wuppertal), it was decided to carry out the complete reconstruction of the station. The old station building was demolished between December 2006 and February 2007. The old pedestrian overpass was replaced by a temporary bridge built by Technisches Hilfswerk in November 2006, which was in place until the completion of the new works. In April 2009, the new station was completed.

== Rail services ==
Since the cessation of passenger services in 1922 to Hasten the only passenger service of the line is the service from Solingen Hauptbahnhof to Wuppertal Hauptbahnhof, now known as S 7 of the Rhine-Ruhr S-Bahn, branded as Der Müngstener, operated every 20 minutes from Monday to Friday and generally every half-hour on weekends and at off-peak times, using (LINT 41) vehicles. Since the closure of the remaining lines branching off at Lennep, there are also no other passenger services in Remscheid city, The route from Remscheid Hauptbahnhof to Bliedinghausen is only used for freight traffic.

Since December 2022, the Station is also served hourly by regional service RE 47 between Düsseldorf Hauptbahnhof and Remscheid-Lennep, operated by Regiobahn.

Two platform tracks are available for passengers and there are also several freight tracks. Located on the forecourt of the station is Remscheid bus station, which is served by many urban and regional bus routes operated by Verkehrsbetriebe Remscheid and other transport companies.
