= Wuppertal-Oberbarmen–Opladen railway =

Railway line in Germany

Overview
- Line number: 2700
- Locale: North Rhine-Westphalia, Germany

Service
- Route number: 228a, 229a, last: 411

Technical
- Line length: 41.3 km (25.7 mi)
- Track gauge: 1,435 mm (4 ft 8 1/2 in) standard gauge
- Operating speed: 70 km/h (43 mph) (max)

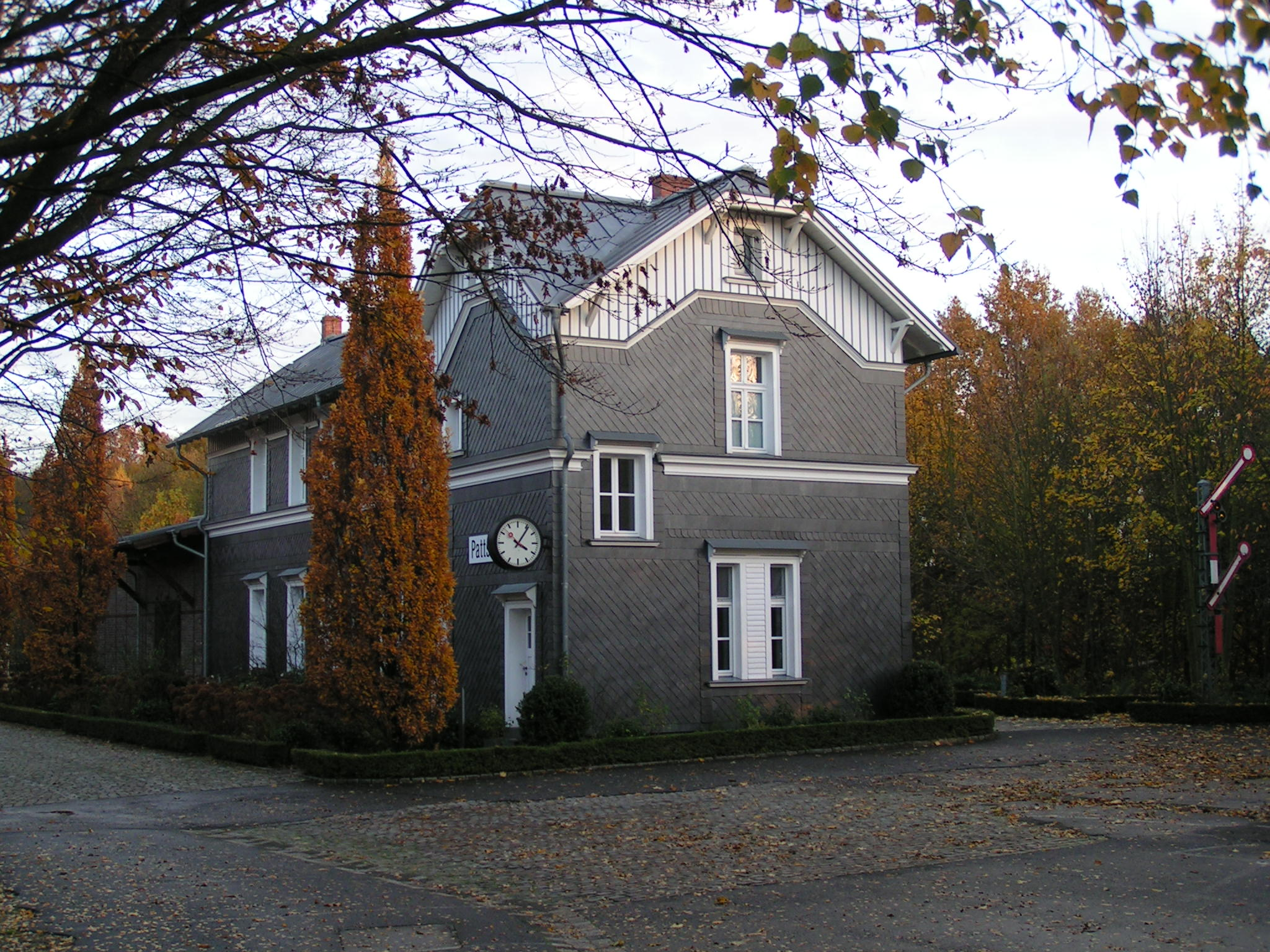
Former Pattscheid station

The Wuppertal-Oberbarmen–Opladen railway was a line built by the Bergisch-Märkische Railway Company in the Bergisches Land of the German state of North Rhine-Westphalia, running from Wuppertal via Remscheid-Lennep, Bergisch Born and Wermelskirchen to Opladen.

The only part of the original line still in operation is the section between Wuppertal-Oberbarmen and Remscheid-Lennep, which is now part of the Wuppertal-Oberbarmen–Solingen line and operated as Rhine-Ruhr S-Bahn line S 7. This is classified as a main line and it is double-track and non-electrified.

The section of the line from Remscheid-Lennep to Opladen was known as the "Balkan Express" because it ran through a sparsely populated area. Services in this section were discontinued in 1994. The line ran between Lennep and Burscheid parallel to federal highway 51 and from Burscheid to Opladen parallel with former federal highway 232. It descends from the Bergisches land to the Rhine Valley between Lennep (337 m above sea level) and Opladen (61 m above sea level).

== History ==
The concession for the construction and operation of the line issued to the Bergisch-Märkische Railway Company (Bergisch-Märkischen Eisenbahn-Gesellschaft, BME), was taken over by the Prussian state railways on 1 January 1882.

On 1 September 1868, the BME opened the line between Remscheid and Wuppertal-Oberbarmen (then called Rittershausen) on the Elberfeld–Dortmund railway, which had opened in 1849. A branch line from Lennep to Remscheid was also opened on the same day. Both of these lines are now considered to be parts of the Wuppertal-Oberbarmen–Solingen line.

An originally single-track line was opened from Lennep to Wermelskirchen on 15 May 1876 and an extension was opened to Opladen for passengers on 15 October 1881. Freight trains had already begun running to Opladen two weeks before the commencement of passenger services. Stops on the line were initially only at Born, Wermelskirchen, Hilgen (Burscheid) and Burscheid. Pattscheid station was opened on 15 November 1881 and further stops were opened between 1900 and 1910. When Deutsche Bundesbahn introduced Uerdingen railbuses for passengers in the early 1950s it built some additional stations that were served only by these railbuses.

The line was planned as a regional connection from Wuppertal via Lennep and Opladen to Cologne. Duplication of the line was completed on 28 April 1910. This work removed the remaining level crossings.

At the end of World War II, the line was disrupted by Allied bombing and the demolition of many bridges by the Wehrmacht. Freight traffic ran again in August 1945, but passenger services only recommenced in October 1945 due to coal shortages. at that time the line was reduced to single track in places and by 1958 it had been consistently rebuilt as single track between Bergisch Born and Opladen. In order to increase the line's capacity is it was upgraded to the main line, which involved increasing the line speed from 50 km/h to 80 km/h.

Passenger services on the line between Wermelskirchen and Hilgen was discontinued by Deutsche Bundesbahn in May 1983. In 1991, the Opladen–Hilgen section was closed after its telephone line was disrupted by a storm. In 1997, the Lennep–Wermelskirchen section was closed.

Part of the route of the former line in Wermelskirchen has been used since August 2005 by a new section of federal highway 51. In the meantime, the cities of Burscheid, Wermelskirchen and Remscheid have agreed to convert the remaining section of the line into a cycling path. Clearing of the line in preparation for the planned works has started in Burscheid, according to an announcement of the press office of the city on 4 January 2011. Deutsche Bahn agreed in late 2011 to sell the section of the line between Opladen and Burscheid to the city of Leverkusen. The Association of Friends and Sponsors of the Balkan Cycling Path (Förderverein der Freunde und Förderer des Radwegs Balkantrasse), which is carrying out the work, anticipates that it will be opened in 2013.
