= Remscheid-Lennep station =

Railway station in Remscheid, Germany

Remscheid Lennep
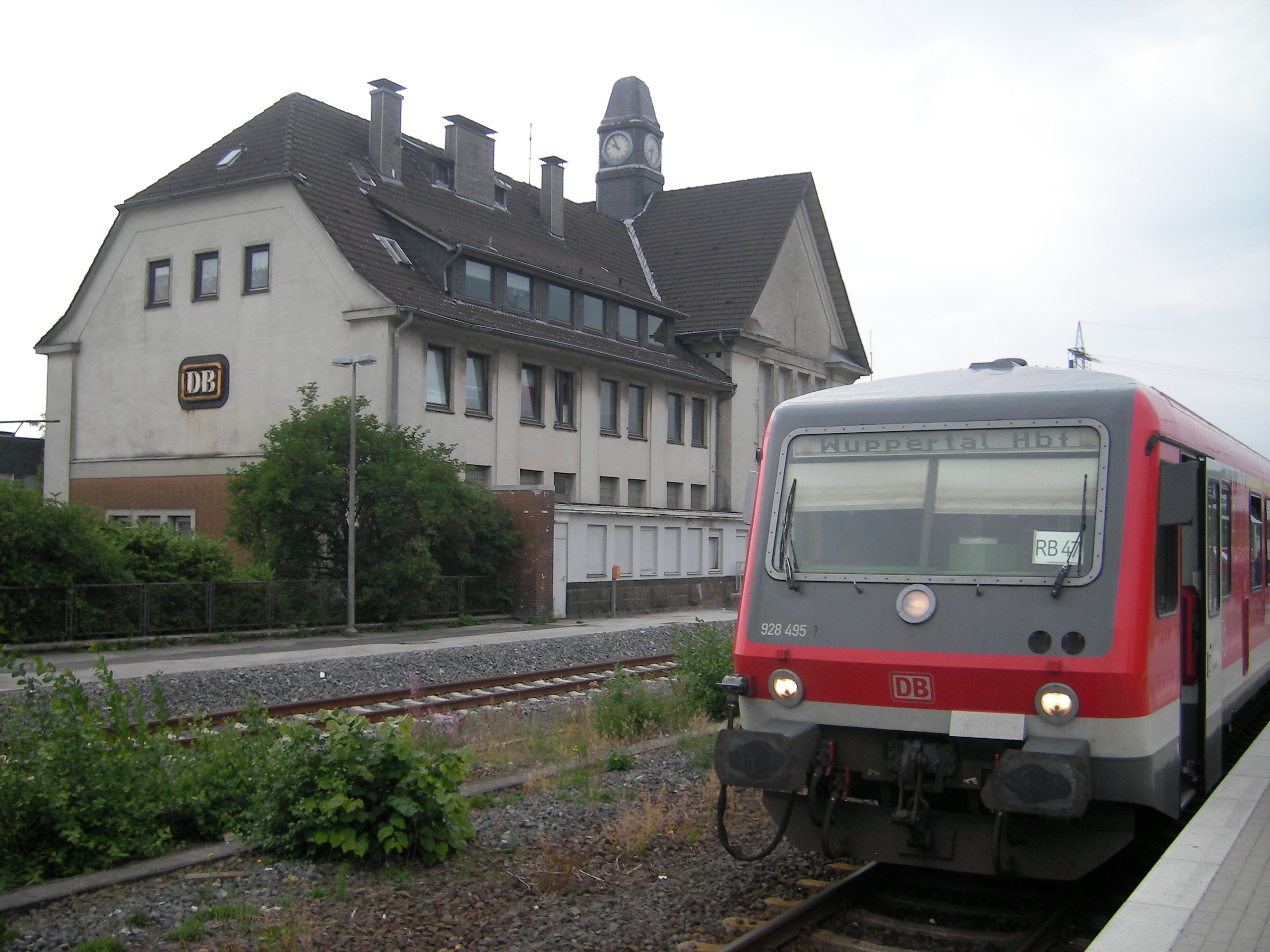
- 2010

General information
- Location: Am Bahnhof 5, Remscheid, NRW; Germany
- Coordinates: 51°11′29″N 7°15′10″E
- Owner: DB Netz
- Operator: DB Station&Service
- Lines: W-Oberbarmen–Solingen (KBS 458)
- Platforms: 2 side platforms
- Tracks: 2
- Train operators: Abellio Rail NRW

Construction
- Accessible: Yes

Other information
- Station code: 5219
- DS100 code: KRL
- IBNR: 8000311
- Category: 5
- Fare zone: VRR: 754; VRS: 1750 (VRR transitional tariff)
- Website: www.bahnhof.de

History
- Opened: 1 September 1868

Services
Preceding station	Regiobahn	Following station
Terminus	RE 47	Remscheid Hbf towards Düsseldorf Hbf
Preceding station	Rhine-Ruhr S-Bahn	Following station
Remscheid-Lüttringhausen towards Wuppertal Hbf	S7	Remscheid Hbf towards Solingen Hbf
Location
- Location within North Rhine-Westphalia

Remscheid-Lennep station is in the city of Remscheid in the German state of North Rhine-Westphalia. It is the second most important station in the city after Remscheid Hauptbahnhof. The station is located west of the old centre of Lennep and is classified by Deutsche Bahn as a category 5 station.

== History ==
On 1 September 1868, the Bergisch-Märkische Railway Company (German: Bergisch-Märkische Eisenbahn-Gesellschaft) opened the first section of the Rittershausen–Opladen line from Oberbarmen (then called Rittershausen) to Lennep. A committee of dignitaries from Barmen and the district of Lennep was established in 1844 to promote a rail link between the district of Lennep—which was a significant centre of industry (including the production of iron and steel goods and cloth)—and Cologne. A Barmen–Lennep–Cologne line was initially planned passing through the Dhünn valley. Then in June 1858, the Lennep Chamber of Commerce asked the Minister for Trade, Commerce and Public Works in Berlin for a branch line from Rittershausen (now called Wuppertal-Oberbarmen) via Lennep to Remscheid, which was approved and opened in 1868, although there continued to be calls for an extension to Cologne. A new line was opened on 12 May 1876 to Wermelskirchen, rather than running through the Dhünn valley; this was extended to Opladen via Burscheid on 1 October 1881.

Lennep was soon connected by the branch line to Remscheid (now considered to be part of the Wuppertal-Oberbarmen–Solingen railway), by a link to Krebsoge station on the Wupper Valley Railway (opened on 1 March 1886) and indirectly to the Wipper Valley Railway at Bergisch Born via the line to Wermelskirchen opened in 1876, giving it more rail connections than its neighbouring cities so that it soon became a hub for rail transport in the Bergisches Land. The station had its own locomotive depot from 1893 to 1960.

In 1929 the town of Lennep was incorporated into Remscheid. However, it took until 18 May 1952 before the station was renamed from Lennep to Remscheid-Lennep station. It had always been more important than Remscheid Hauptbahnhof. This changed, however, with the closure of the Wupper Valley Railway in 1956 and passenger services on the Wipper Valley Railway in 1986. Finally in 1995 freight traffic was abandoned between Remscheid-Lennep and Wipperfurth on the remaining part of the Wipper Valley Railway.

== Rebuilding ==
The station was rebuilt from early 2009 until June 2010. As a result, the station now has two side platforms, which are connected by an underpass. In addition, the old station building was restored and tracks that were no longer needed were dismantled.

== Rail services ==
The station is served by line S 7 of the Rhine-Ruhr S-Bahn, branded as Der Müngstener, operated every 20 minutes from Monday to Friday and generally every half hour on weekends and at off-peak times, using (LINT 41) vehicles.

Since December 2022, the Station is also served hourly by regional service RE 47 between Düsseldorf Hauptbahnhof and Remscheid-Lennep, operated by Regiobahn.

It is served by bus route 240, operated by Wiedenhoff at 60-minute intervals and by bus route 336, operated by Oberbergische Verkehrs-AG at 60-minute intervals. It is served by six bus routes operated by Stadtwerke Remscheid, 654 (20 minute intervals), 655 (20), 659 (20), 664 (20/40) and 671 (30-60).
