= Müngsten Bridge =

Müngsten Bridge Müngstener Brücke
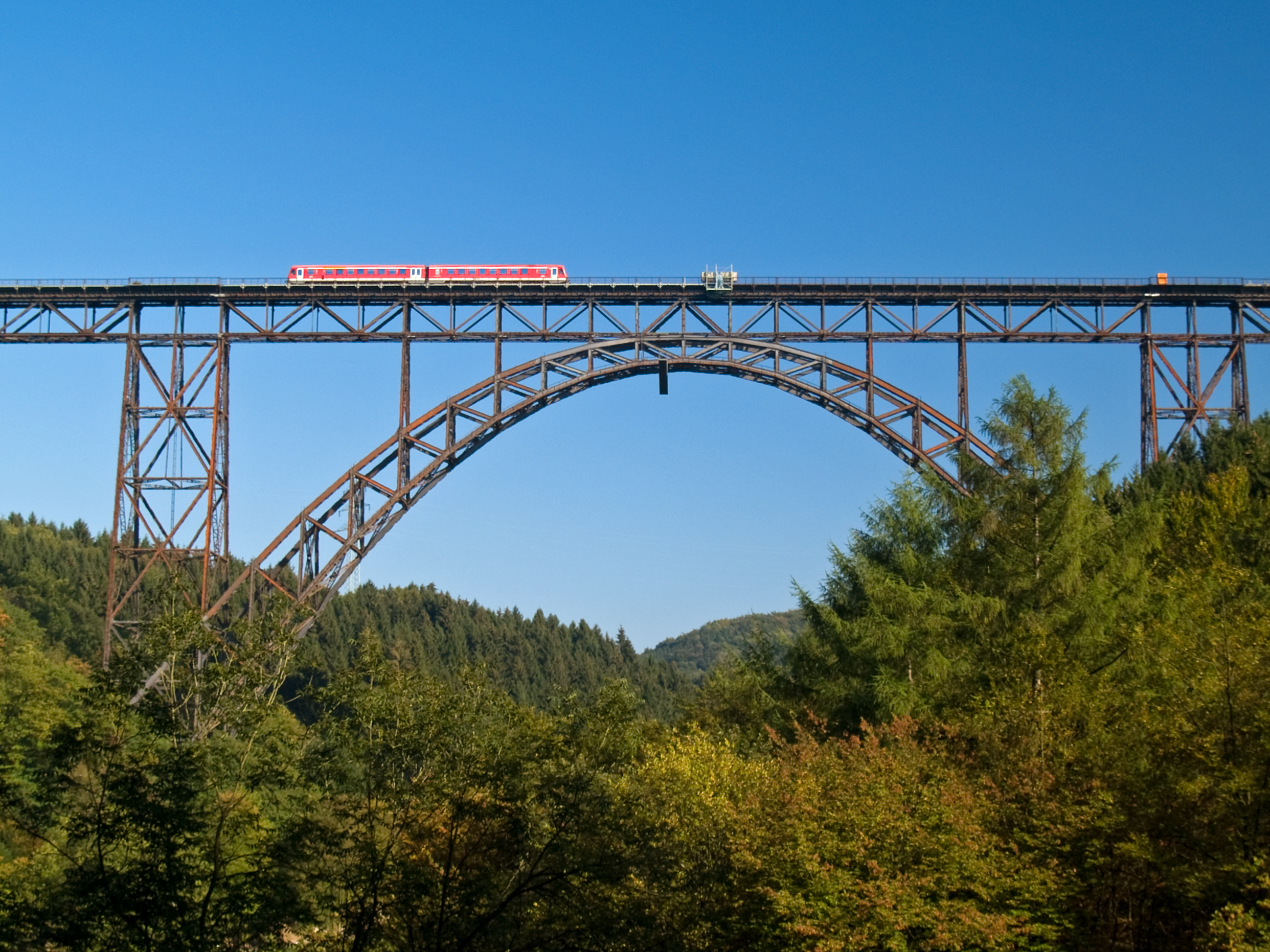
- Coordinates: 51°09′38″N 7°08′00″E
- Carries: Wuppertal-Oberbarmen–Solingen railway
- Crosses: Wupper
- Locale: Solingen

Characteristics
- Design: Truss arch bridge
- Total length: 465 metres (1,526 ft)
- Height: 107 metres (351 ft)
- Longest span: 170 metres (560 ft)

History
- Designer: Anton von Rieppel
- Construction end: 1897
- Opened: 15 July 1897

The Müngsten Bridge is the highest railway bridge in Germany. The bridge is 107 metres (351 ft) high and spans the valley of the river Wupper, carrying the Wuppertal-Oberbarmen–Solingen railway between the cities of Remscheid and Solingen. It is used by line S7 of the Rhine-Ruhr S-Bahn and the RE47 Regional-Express service, although the RE47 service is being operated by a replacement bus service until 2026.

Originally the bridge was named the Kaiser-Wilhelm-Brücke (Emperor Wilhelm Bridge) to honour Emperor Wilhelm I. After the end of the monarchy the bridge was renamed after the nearby settlement of Müngsten, which is close to the city limits of Solingen, Remscheid and Wuppertal. Today, the settlement no longer exists, so Müngsten is simply a landmark.

== History ==
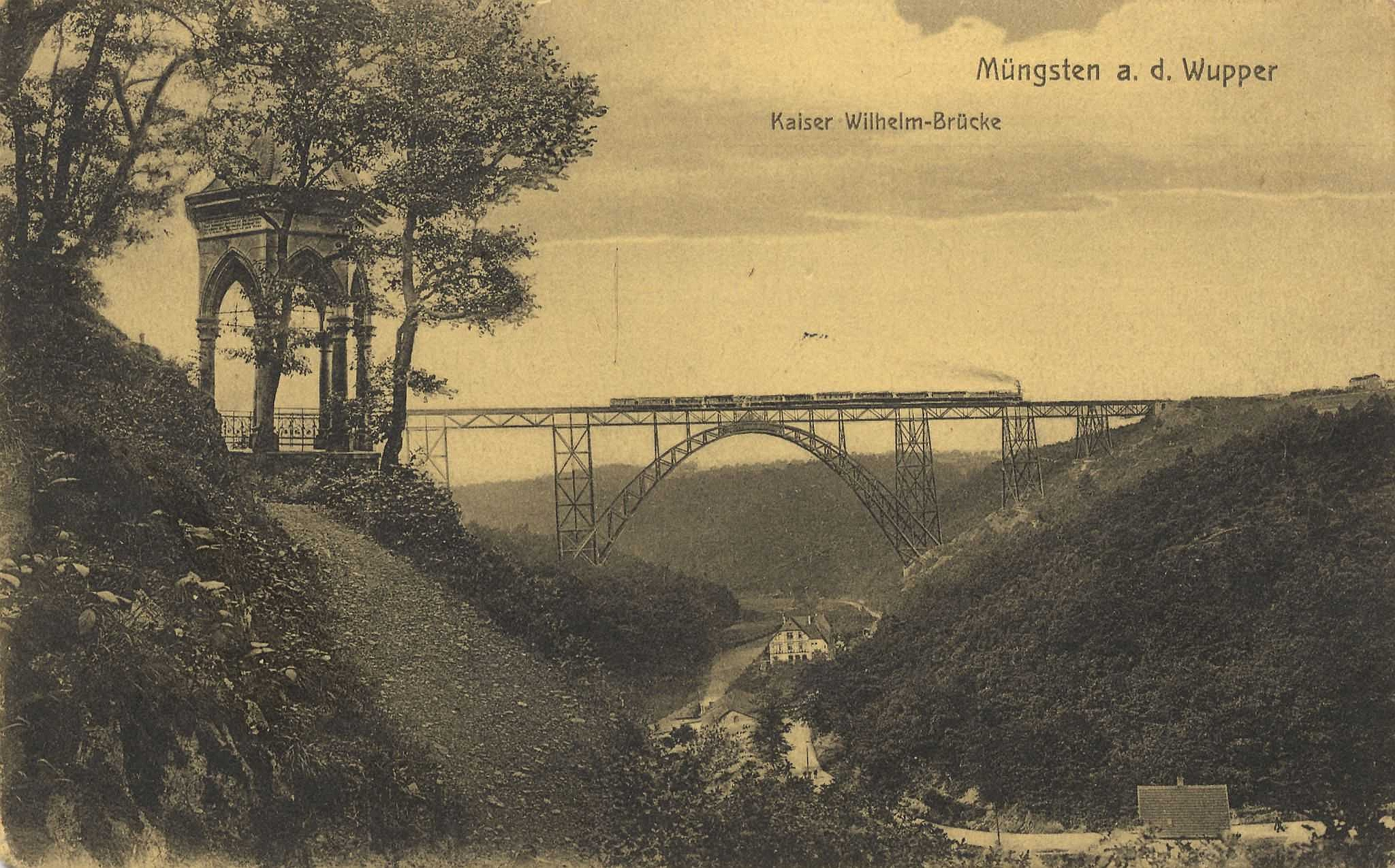
Postcard showing the bridge in 1912

The first plans for a bridge connecting the cities of Remscheid and Solingen go back as far as 1889. The Prussian Parliament approved the 5 million Marks required to build the bridge in 1890. Preparatory work began in 1893, first breaking of the earth was on 26 February 1894, and the bridge was finished in 1897. Anton von Rieppel (1852 – 1926), an architect and engineer, was in charge of the project. A memorial plaque at the foot of the bridge reminds one of his efforts. The opening of the bridge shrank the distance by rail between the cities of Remscheid and Solingen from 44 km (27 mi) to 8 km (5.0 mi).

The bridge's official inauguration celebration took place on 15 July 1897. Emperor Wilhelm II did not attend the ceremony in person. Prince Friedrich Leopold of Prussia attended the festivities instead. Emperor Wilhelm II visited the bridge two years later, on 12 August 1899.

== Design ==
The overall length of the structure is 465 m (1,526 ft). The main arch has a span of 170 m (560 ft) with trestle bridge sections either side of it supported by 15 m (49 ft) wide columns with a maximum height of 69 m (226 ft).

A total of 1,400 kg (3,100 lb) of dynamite and 1,500 kg (3,300 lb) of black powder were needed during construction of the foundations, and around of 5,000 tonnes (4,900 long tons; 5,500 short tons) of iron and steel were used in the bridge's construction, with 950,000 rivets holding the structure together.

Originally, the bridge was planned to be single-track. However, high future traffic growth projections led to the redesign as a dual-track bridge.

== See also ==
- List of bridges in Germany
