= Wuppertal-Oberbarmen–Solingen railway =

German railway line

Coordinates: 51.2747°N 7.2235°E

Wuppertal–Solingen railway
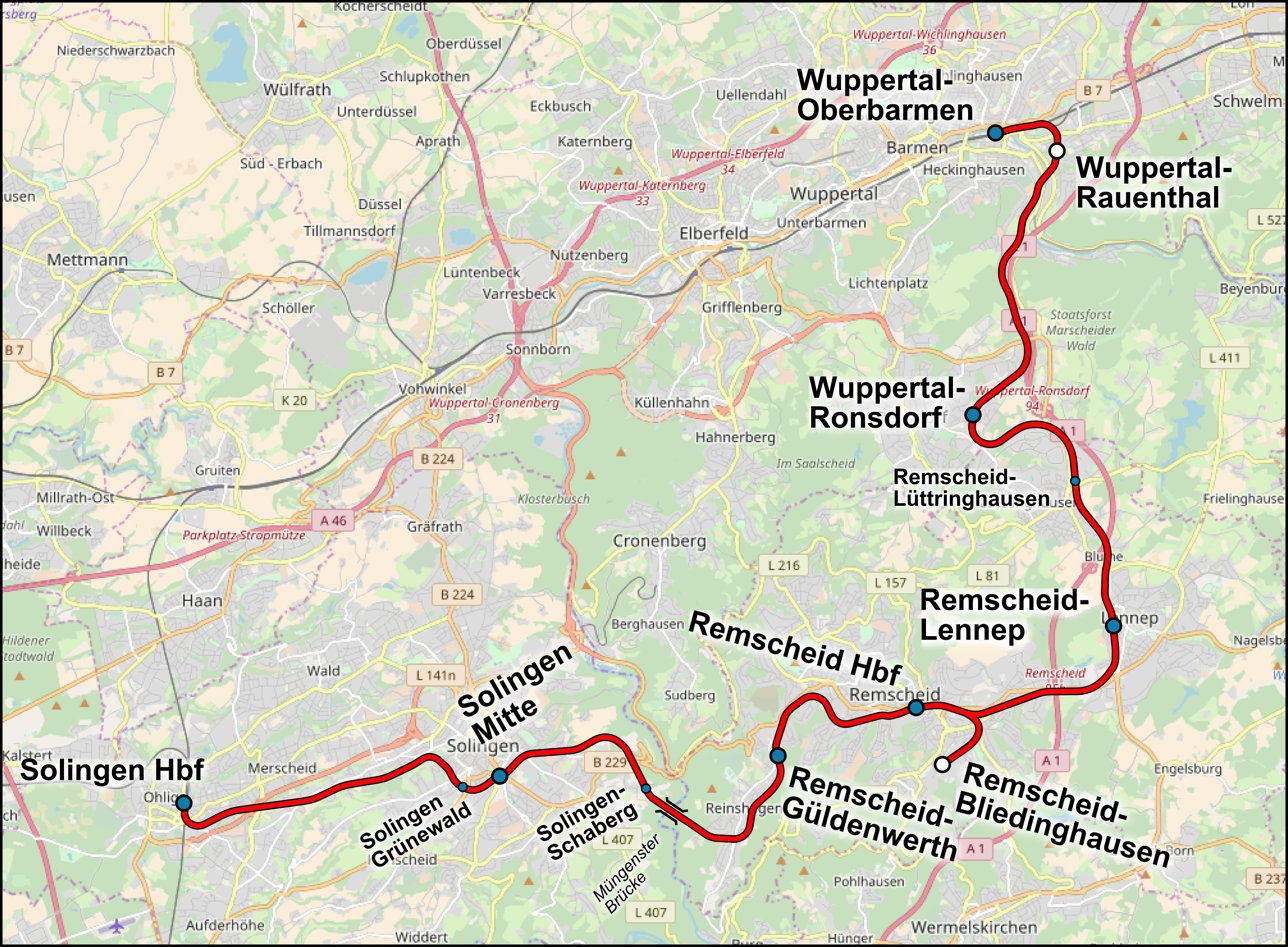

Overview
- Line number: 2700 (W-Oberbarmen–RS-Lennep); 2705 (RS-Lennep–RS); 2706 (RS–RS-Bliedinghausen); 2675 (RS–SG)
- Locale: North Rhine-Westphalia, Germany

Service
- Route number: 450.7

Technical
- Line length: 35 km (22 mi)
- Track gauge: 1,435 mm (4 ft 8 1/2 in) standard gauge
- Operating speed: 80 km/h (50 mph) (max)

The Wuppertal-Oberbarmen–Solingen railway is a line in the Bergisches Land in the German state of North Rhine-Westphalia, which connects the three Bergisch cities of Wuppertal, Remscheid and Solingen. It is classified as a main line and is double track and non-electrified.

Today's route is made up largely of sections of three formerly independent routes built by the Bergisch-Märkische Railway Company (German: Bergisch-Märkische Eisenbahn-Gesellschaft, BME). The section between Remscheid and Solingen was built after the BME's nationalisation by the Prussian state railways.

== History ==
The modern line between Solingen and Wuppertal includes several sections that originally formed parts of several independent lines:

- the Solingen–Wuppertal-Vohwinkel railway,
- the Wuppertal-Oberbarmen–Opladen railway,
- the Lennep–Hasten railway.

The section between Remscheid and Solingen was built after the BME's nationalisation by the Prussian state railways.

=== Ohligs Wald–Solingen (Weyersberg) ===
In 1867, the Bergisch-Märkische Railway, after many years of negotiations, began work on the construction of a 5.6-kilometre spur line to the city of Solingen (well known for its production of knives and scissors) from Ohligs station (then called Ohligs Wald and now called Solingen Hauptbahnhof). This line was completed on 25 September 1867. In that year, the Gruiten–Köln-Deutz railway was completed.

The line ended at a terminal station in Solingen Weyersberg, which was some distance from the city, but the line was primarily used for freight and passenger services were limited.

=== Weyersberg junction–Wuppertal-Vohwinkel ===
20 years later, on 12 February 1890, Solingen received a much better connection towards the Ruhr with the opening of the Solingen–Wuppertal-Vohwinkel line, known as the Korkenzieherbahn ("Corkscrew Railway"), to Vohwinkel.

Passenger services were abandoned to Solingen-Weyersberg with the opening of the "Corkscrew Railway". Trains ran from Weyersberg junction in a wide arc to the south around the city of Solingen, through the newly opened Solingen Süd station, which was significantly closer to the city of Solingen.

Solingen-Weyersberg station was now only a freight yard. It was closed along with the branch line from Weyersberg junction in 1912.

=== Wuppertal-Oberbarmen–Remscheid ===
On 1 September 1868, Remscheid was connected at Wuppertal-Oberbarmen (then called Rittershausen) with the Elberfeld–Dortmund railway, opened in 1849. The Bergisch-Märkische Railway Company opened the line from Rittershausen via Lennep to Remscheid as part of its Wuppertal-Oberbarmen–Opladen line. It gained the concession to build the last section of this line between Bergisch Born and Opladen only on 12 June 1872. The section between Lennep and Remscheid was originally planned and built as a branch line of the Wuppertal-Oberbarmen–Opladen line and was also opened on 1 September 1868.

A 2.4 km long branch from Remscheid Hauptbahnhof to Bliedinghausen was built in 1896, which has only ever been used for freight.

=== Solingen–Remscheid ===
The remaining section between Remscheid and Solingen crossed very difficult topography and it was not completed until 1897 following the construction of several bridges.

A line was opened on 14 December 1893 from Solingen Süd Station for the transport of construction of material to Müngsten Bridge, which, when opened on 15 July 1897, completed the line to Remscheid.

Already on 17 May 1897 a second track was opened between Ohligs and Solingen Süd and duplication was completed to Remscheid in 1907. Solingen Süd was expanded and renamed Solingen Hauptbahnhof in 1913. In 1914, Remscheid station was renamed Remscheid Hauptbahnhof.

=== Further development ===
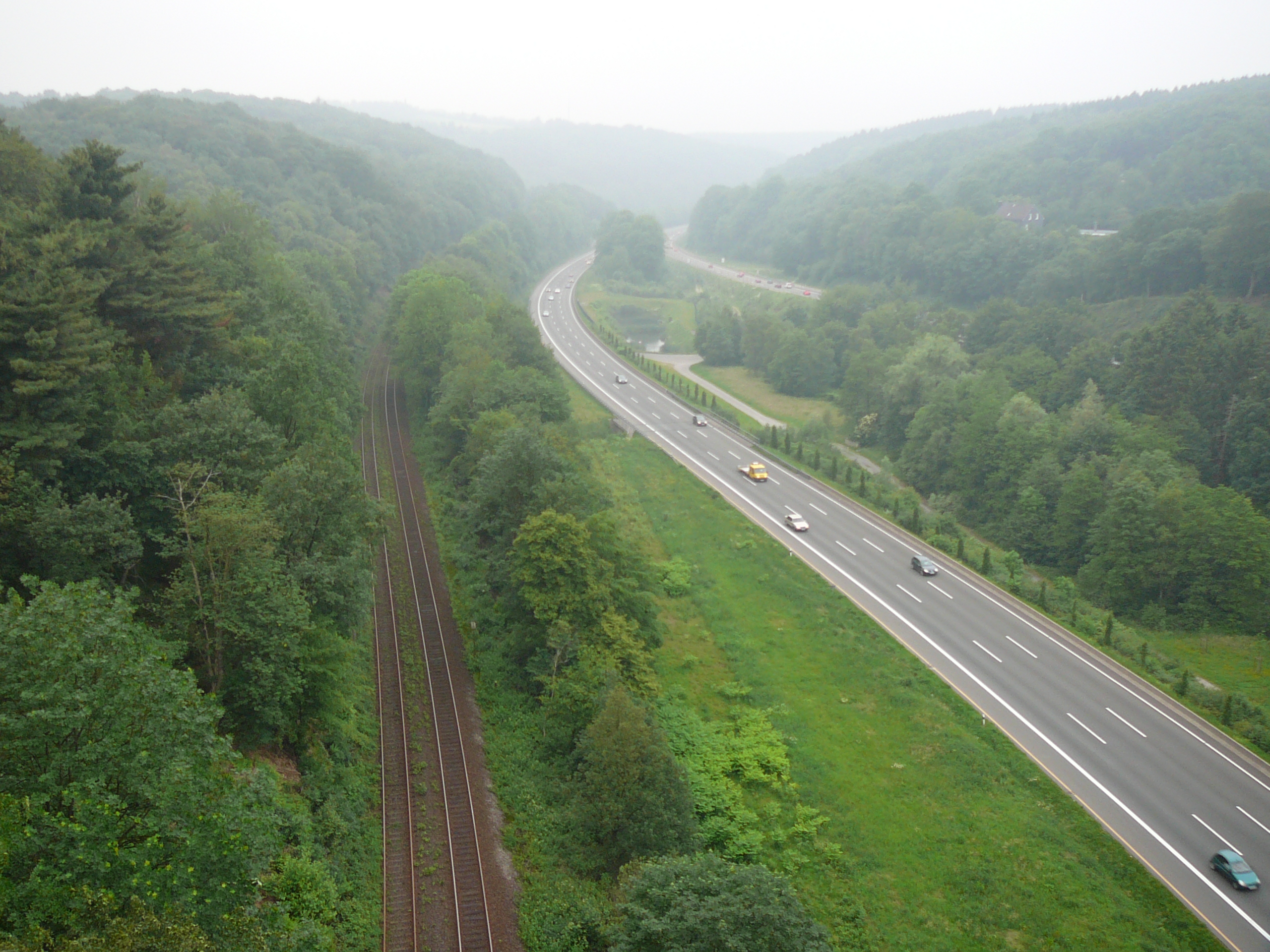
The line in Blombach valley

Both passenger and freight traffic on the line increased steadily. Remscheid-Lennep had become a major station, at the junction of three lines: the Wipper Valley Railway to Wipperfurth and Marienheide, the connection to Krebsoge station on the Wupper Valley Railway between Radevormwald and Wuppertal-Oberbarmen, and the Lennep–Opladen line. An engine depot was also built in Lennep for operations on the routes branching from it.

After the Second World War operations changed from steam to diesel haulage and in the 1970s freight traffic declined. Only a few companies on the line are now served by rail freight. There is still significant passenger traffic, which is now served with diesel multiple units.

=== Modernisation ===
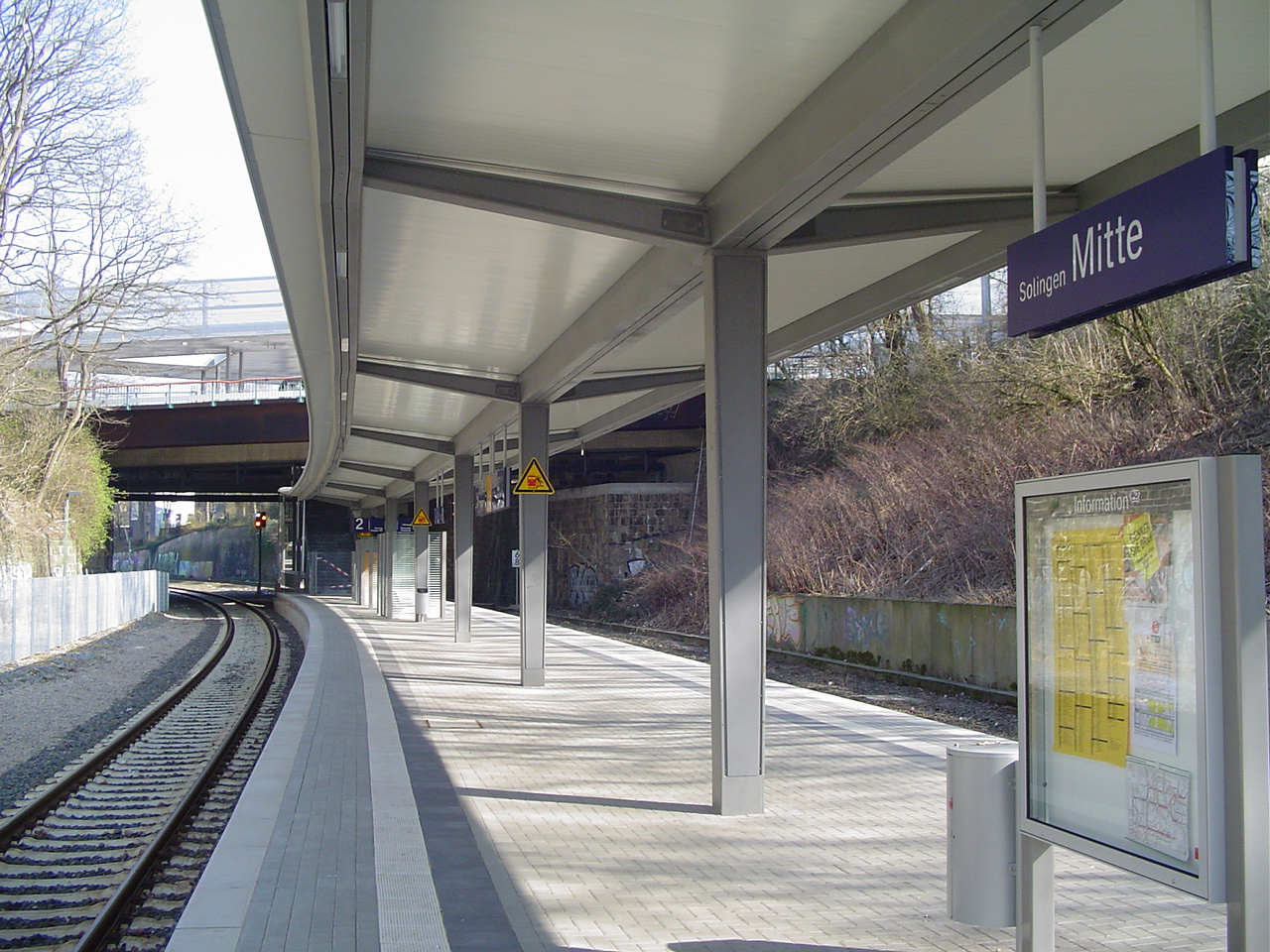
Solingen Mitte station

The stations on the route have been upgraded over several years. This is especially evident in Solingen, where the former Hauptbahnhof (central station) was closed in May 2006. A replacement station was opened at the same time at Solingen Grünewald, not far away from the old Hauptbahnhof and much better connected to the city and buses. At the timetable change in December 2006, a second new station was opened at Solingen Mitte.

The name of Solingen Hauptbahnhof has since 2006 been applied to the former Solingen-Ohligs station, which is the only stop for Regional-Express, Intercity and Intercity-Express in the city of Solingen.

== Operations ==
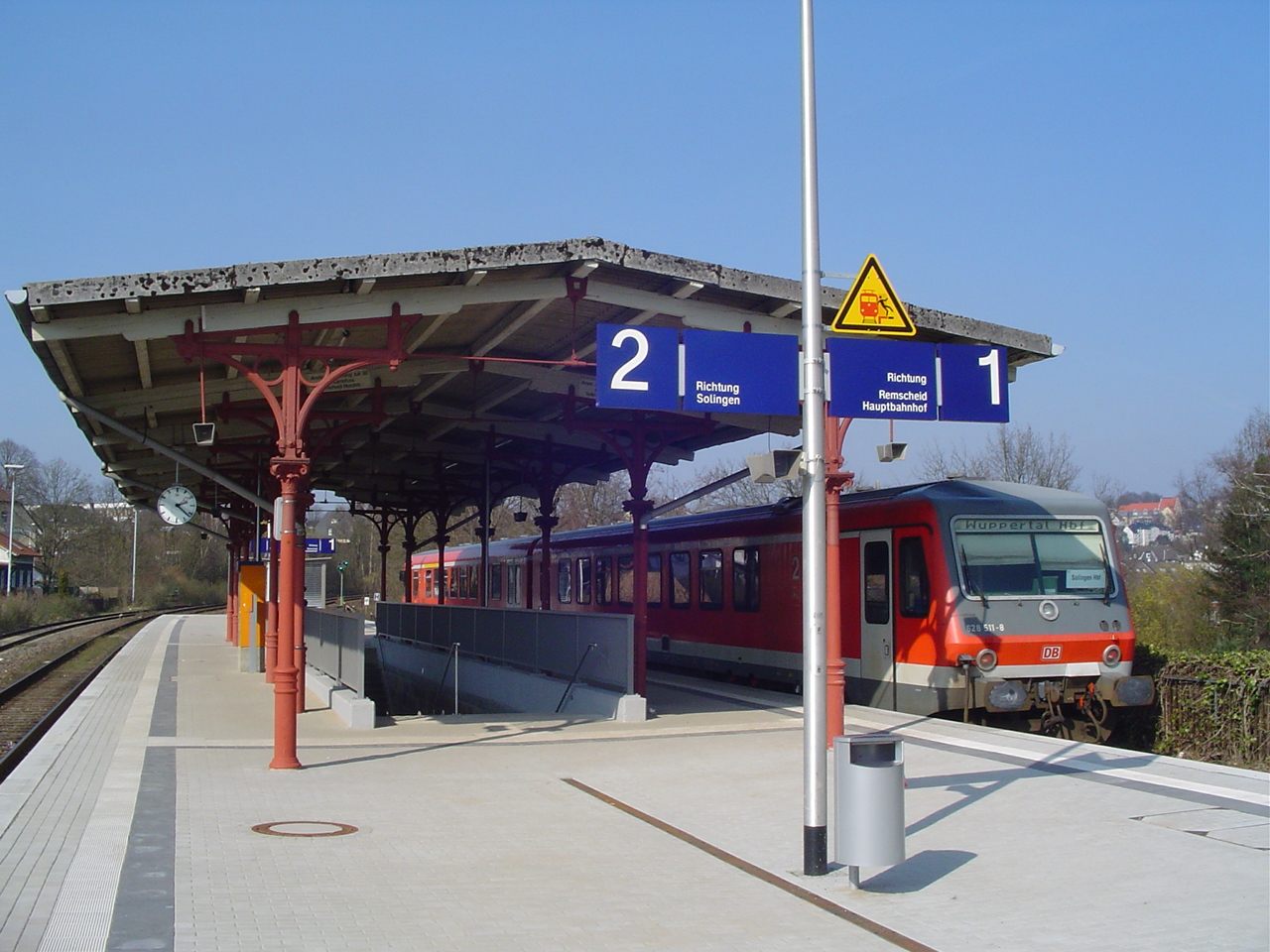
A class 628 train in Remscheid-Güldenwerth station

Services over the line have been operated as Rhine-Ruhr S-Bahn line S 7 by Abellio Rail NRW with LINT 41 vehicles since 2013. On weekdays, trains run during the day at 20-minute intervals, in the evenings and on weekends, every 30 minutes. Not all the trains run over the entire route; some trips (from both directions) terminate in Remscheid.

Deutsche Bahn operated the service with class 628 diesel multiple units from 1994 to 2013. The line was served along its entire length—and beyond it to Wuppertal Hauptbahnhof—by a Regionalbahn service, Der Müngstener (RB 47). The name referred to the meeting of the three cities of Solingen, Remscheid and Wuppertal near the former settlement of Müngsten at the line's crossing of the Wupper over Müngsten Bridge, the highest steel railway bridge in Germany. There were many cancellations due to the vehicles' lack of power and the hilly route, especially in the autumn. Following the tendering of services on the line from November 2009 to July 2010, a new operator, Abellio Rail NRW, took over operations from 2013 with more powerful LINT 41 vehicles.

Since December 2022, Regional Express line RE47 runs hourly on the section between Solingen Hauptbahnhof and Remscheid-Lennep

== Structures ==
=== Bridges ===
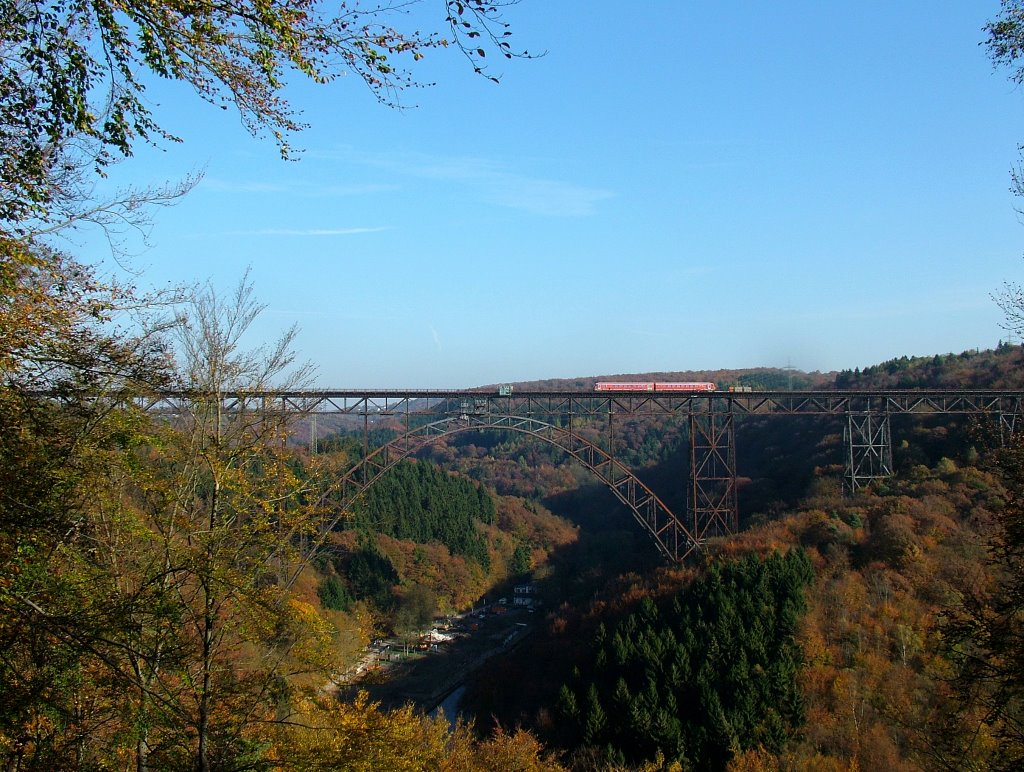
A train on Müngsten Bridge

Due to the mountainous landscape, the railway required the building of numerous structures such as bridges and tunnels. The highest railway bridge at 107 m, is Müngsten Bridge, which crosses the valley of the Wupper between Remscheid and Solingen. Every autumn the so-called Brückenfest ("bridge festival") is held, during which special trains are also operated on the line. The bridge was inaugurated in 1897 and is the largest engineering structure on the route.

There are a number of other bridges, especially on the section between Solingen and Remscheid, Only a few hundred metres away there is Windfeln Bridge, which is considered the "little sister" of Müngsten Bridge.

=== Tunnels ===
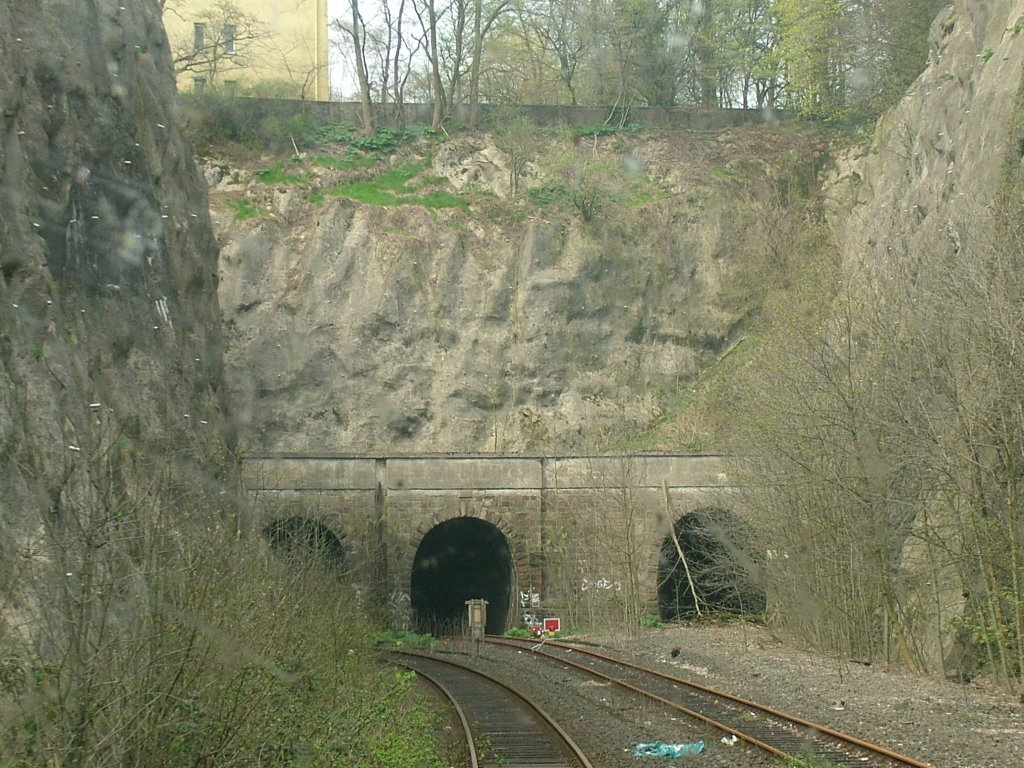
The southern portal of the Rauenthal Tunnel, on the right is the Langerfeld Tunnel

Another notable structure is the Rauenthal Tunnel in Wuppertal, through which the railway runs between Oberbarmen and Ronsdorf under a mountain range and the residential area located on it. Two parallel tunnel tubes were cut through the mountain for the double-track line.

Directly next to the southern portal of the two tunnels there is a third, which was part of the former Langerfeld Tunnel, connecting the Wuppertal-Rauenthal freight yard with the container yard of Wuppertal-Langerfeld. This tunnel is now closed.

As the eastern tube of Rauenthal Tunnel has been blocked since 2005 for safety reasons, trains only use the western tube. South of the tunnel, Rauenthal station ends in a deep cutting.
