= Solingen Hauptbahnhof =

Main station in Solingen, Germany

Solingen Hbf
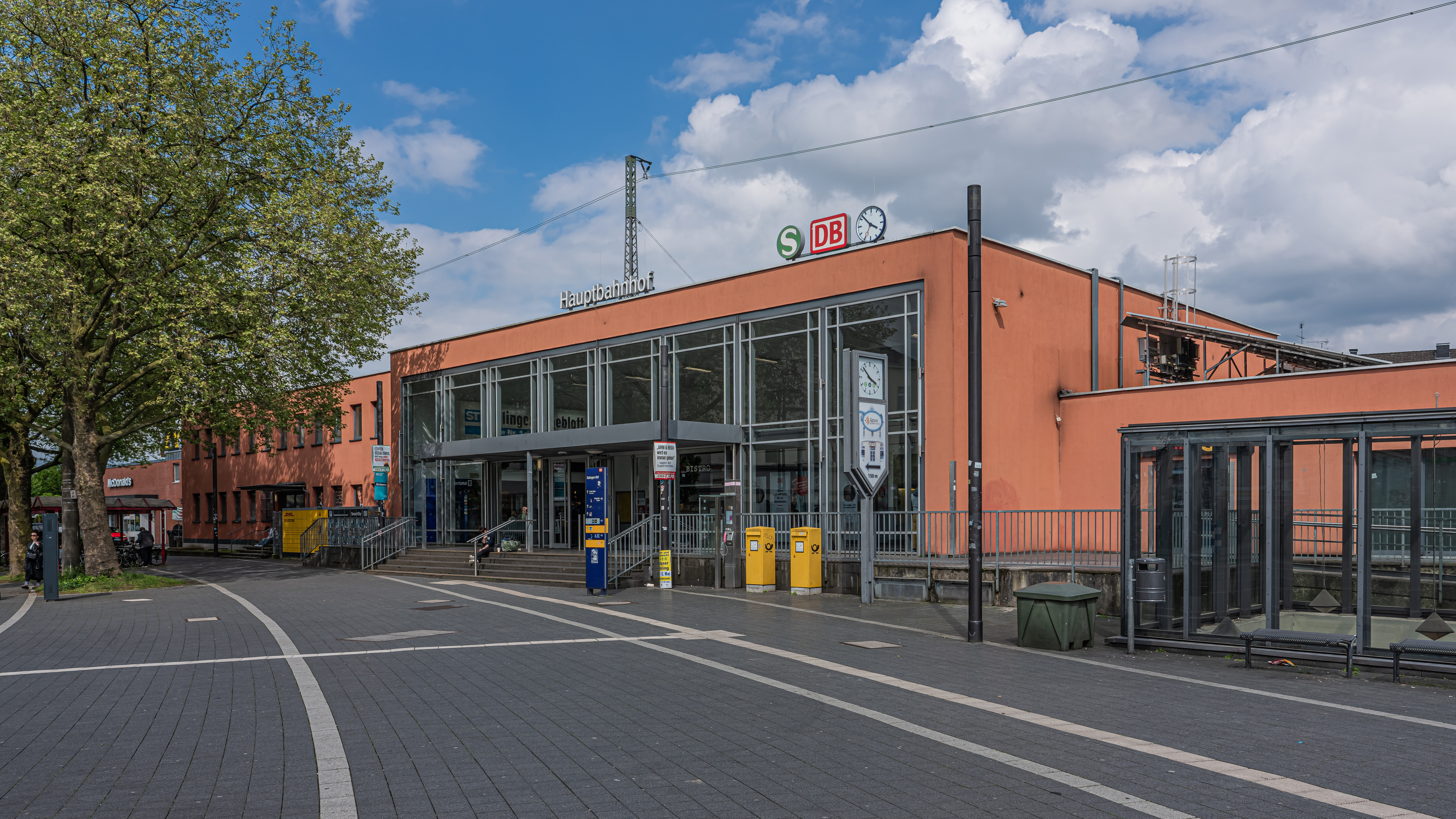

General information
- Location: Bahnstr. 5, Solingen, NRW; Germany
- Coordinates: 51°09′41.5″N 7°00′15″E
- Lines: Wuppertal–Köln-Deutz (KBS 455); Solingen–Wuppertal (KBS 458); Solingen–Düsseldorf (KBS 450.1)
- Platforms: 5

Construction
- Accessible: Yes

Other information
- Station code: 5882
- DS100 code: KSO
- Category: 2
- Fare zone: VRR: 746; VRS: 1740 (VRR transitional zone)
- Website: www.bahnhof.de

History
- Opened: 25 September 1867
- Former names: Ohligs-Wald

Passengers
- 20,000

Services
Preceding station	DB Fernverkehr	Following station
Wuppertal Hbf towards Berlin Ostbahnhof	ICE 10	Köln Hbf One-way operation
Wuppertal Hbf towards Dortmund Hbf	ICE 42	Köln Hbf towards München Hbf
Wuppertal Hbf towards Dortmund Hbf	ICE 91	Köln Hbf towards Wien Hbf
Wuppertal Hbf towards Dresden Hbf	IC 55	Köln Hbf towards Stuttgart Hbf
Preceding station	National Express Germany	Following station
Wuppertal Hbf towards Rheine	RE 7 (Rhein-Münsterland-Express)	Opladen towards Krefeld Hbf
Haan towards Wuppertal-Oberbarmen	RB 48 (Rhein-Wupper-Bahn)	Leichlingen towards Bonn-Mehlem
Preceding station	Regiobahn	Following station
Solingen-Grünewald towards Remscheid-Lennep	RE 47	Hilden towards Düsseldorf Hbf
Preceding station	Rhine-Ruhr S-Bahn	Following station
Solingen Vogelpark towards Dortmund Hbf	S1	Terminus
Solingen Grünewald towards Wuppertal Hbf	S7	Terminus
Location

Solingen Hauptbahnhof is the only railway station in Solingen, Germany, to be served by ICE and IC long distance trains.

== History ==
The first station in the area of present-day town of Solingen was built with the opening of the Gruiten-Cologne-Mülheim railway by the Bergisch-Märkische Railway Company. The station opened on 25 September 1867 and was named Ohligs Wald ("Ohligs forest"). That same year a branch line to Solingen was built from this station. In 1890, the Wald part of the name was dropped and with the incorporation of Ohligs into Solingen in 1929, the station was renamed Solingen-Ohligs. In 1894, the line from Hilden was opened.

The importance of the Solingen-Ohligs station always exceeded that of the other stations in Solingen, including the old Solingen Hauptbahnhof, since only Ohligs station is located on a main line. Consequently, it was the stopping point for long-distance traffic. This factor lead to the discussion of renaming this station to Hauptbahnhof and giving the Hauptbahnhof a new name. These discussions, however, never came to a conclusion, so the station kept its name until the end of 2006. With the decommissioning of the old Hauptbahnhof in May 2006, Solingen-Ohligs station was renamed as Solingen Hauptbahnhof on 10 December 2006.
