= Abellio Deutschland =

Public transit operator in Germany

Abellio Rail NRW
- Industry: Public transport
- Founded: 2004
- Headquarters: Berlin, Germany
- Owner: Abellio
- Divisions: Abellio Rail NRW; Abellio Rail Mitteldeutschland; Abellio Rail Baden-Württemberg
- Subsidiaries: WestfalenBahn
- Website: www.abellio.de

Abellio Deutschland is a public transit operator in Germany operating bus and rail networks. Headquartered in Berlin, it is a subsidiary of the Dutch state-owned Abellio.

== History ==
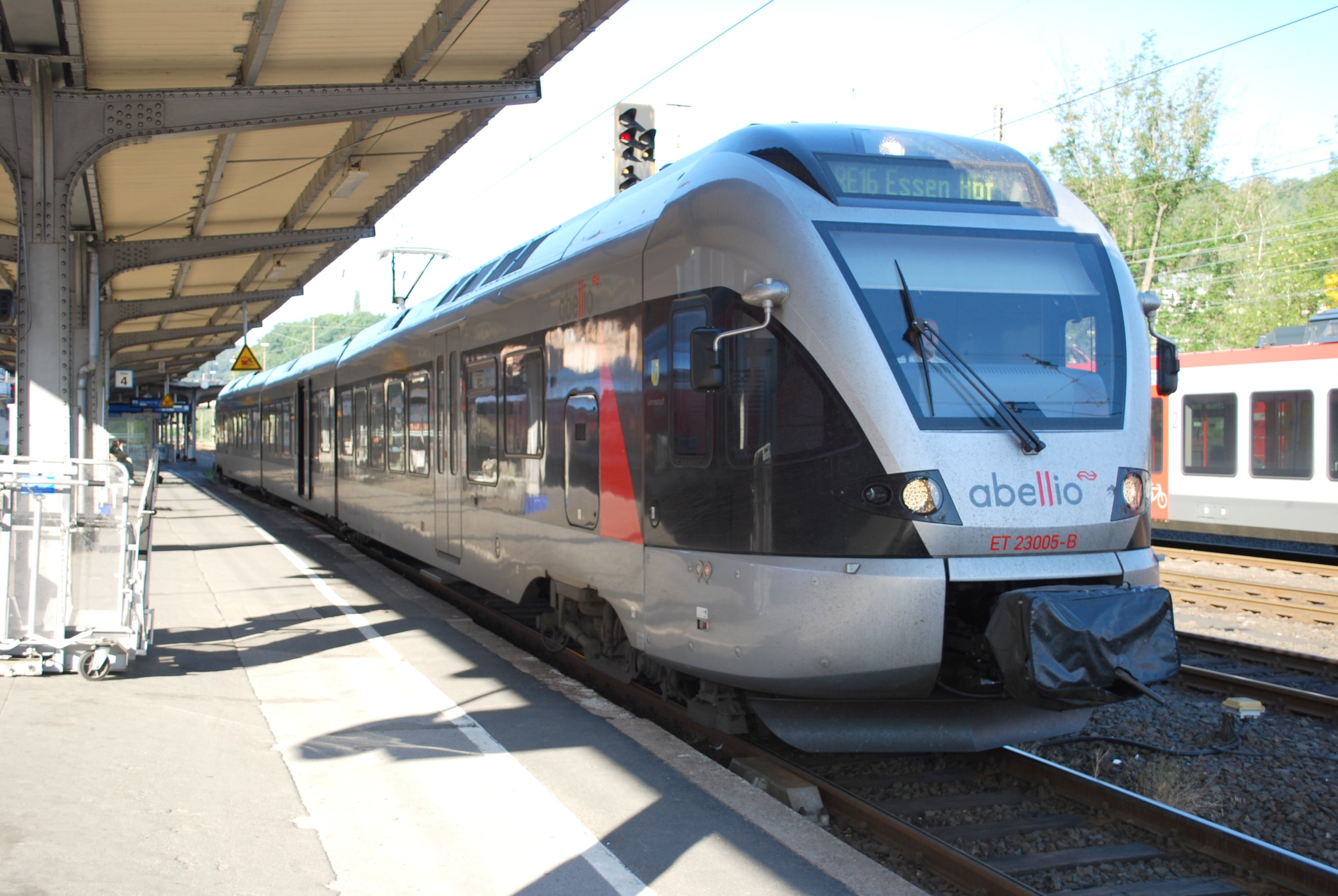
Abellio Rail NRW Stadler Flirt ET 23005 at Siegen in June 2011

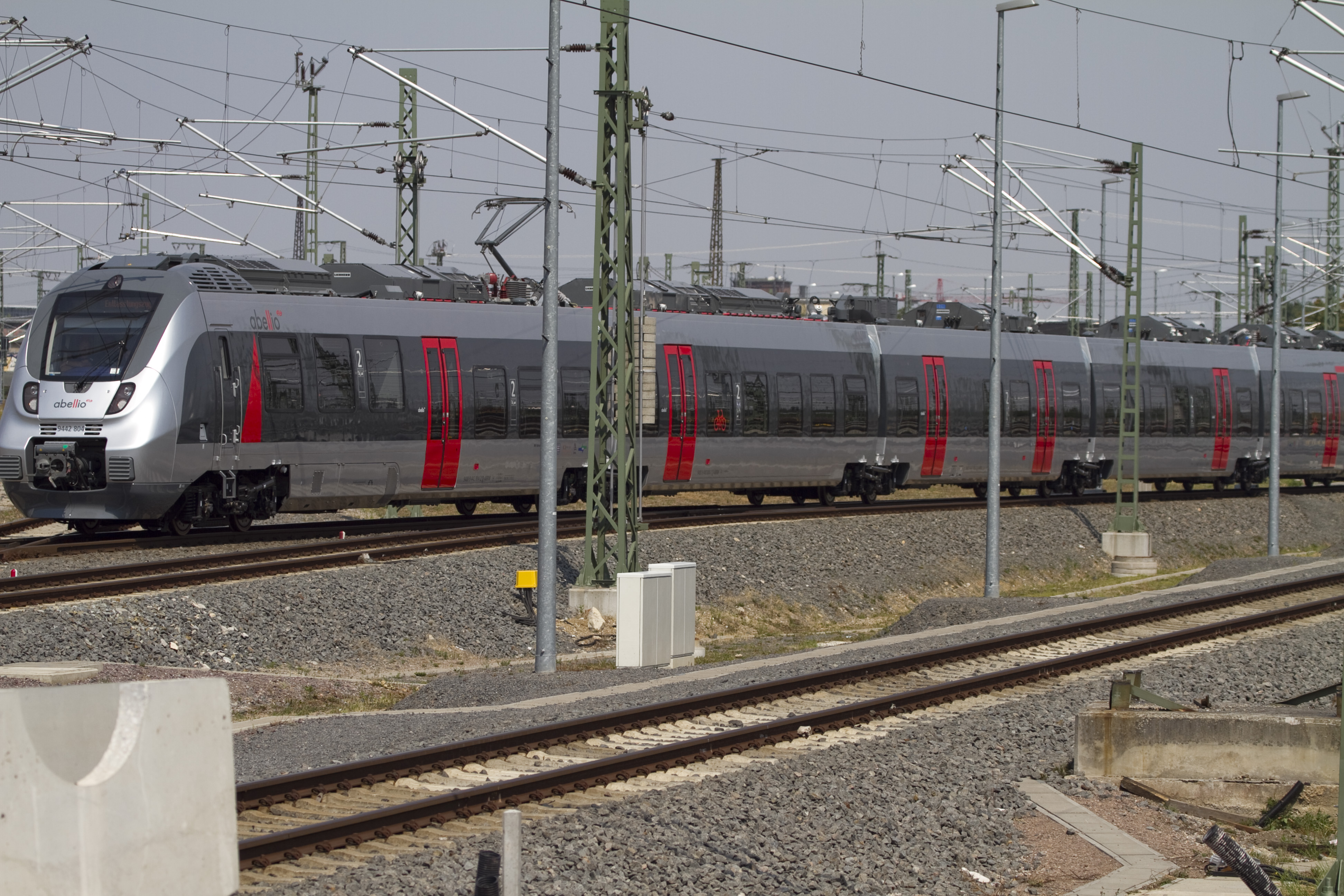
Abellio Rail Mitteldeutschland Bombardier Talent 2 at Leipzig in August 2015

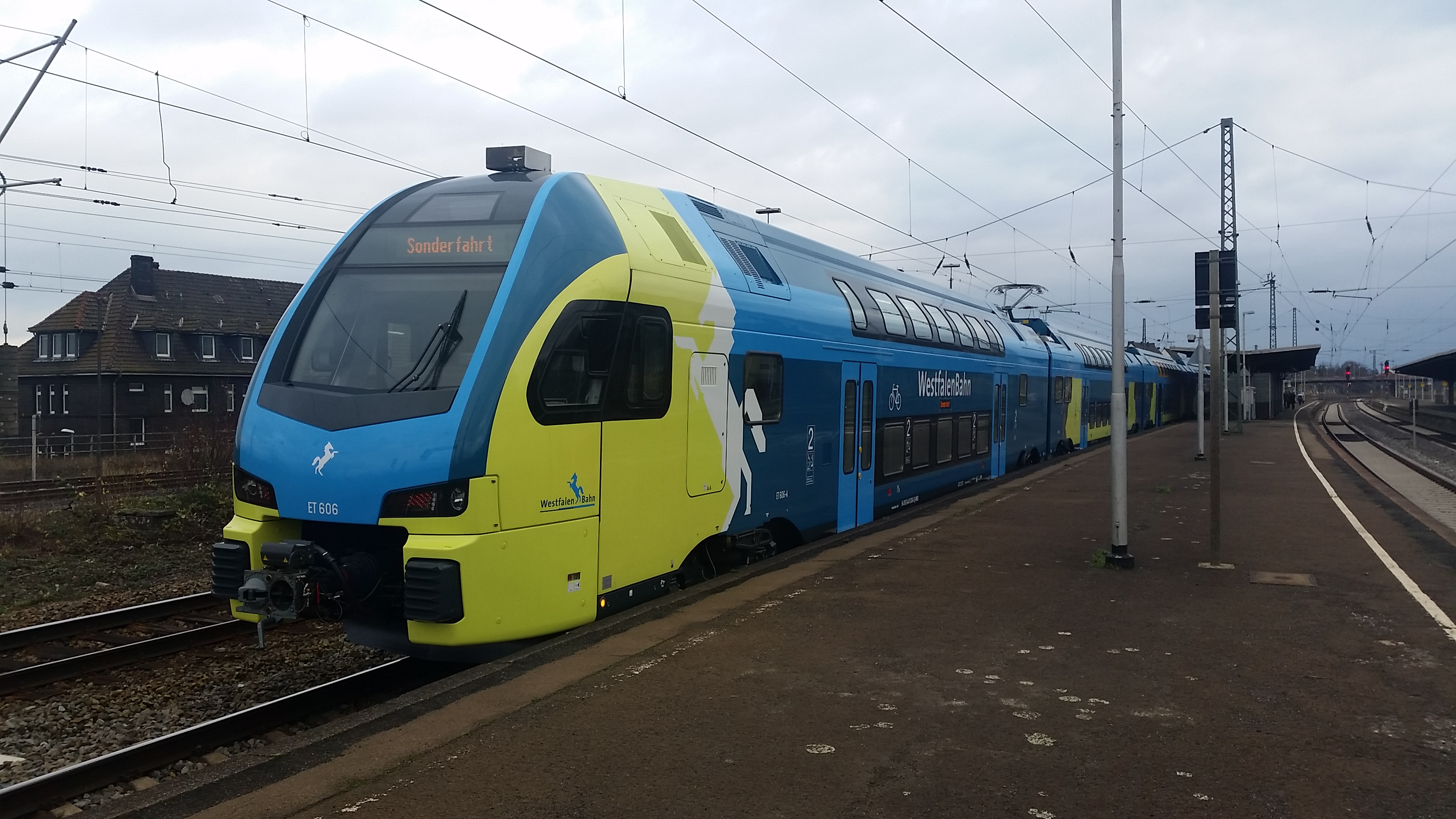
WestfalenBahn Stadler Kiss at Löhne in December 2015

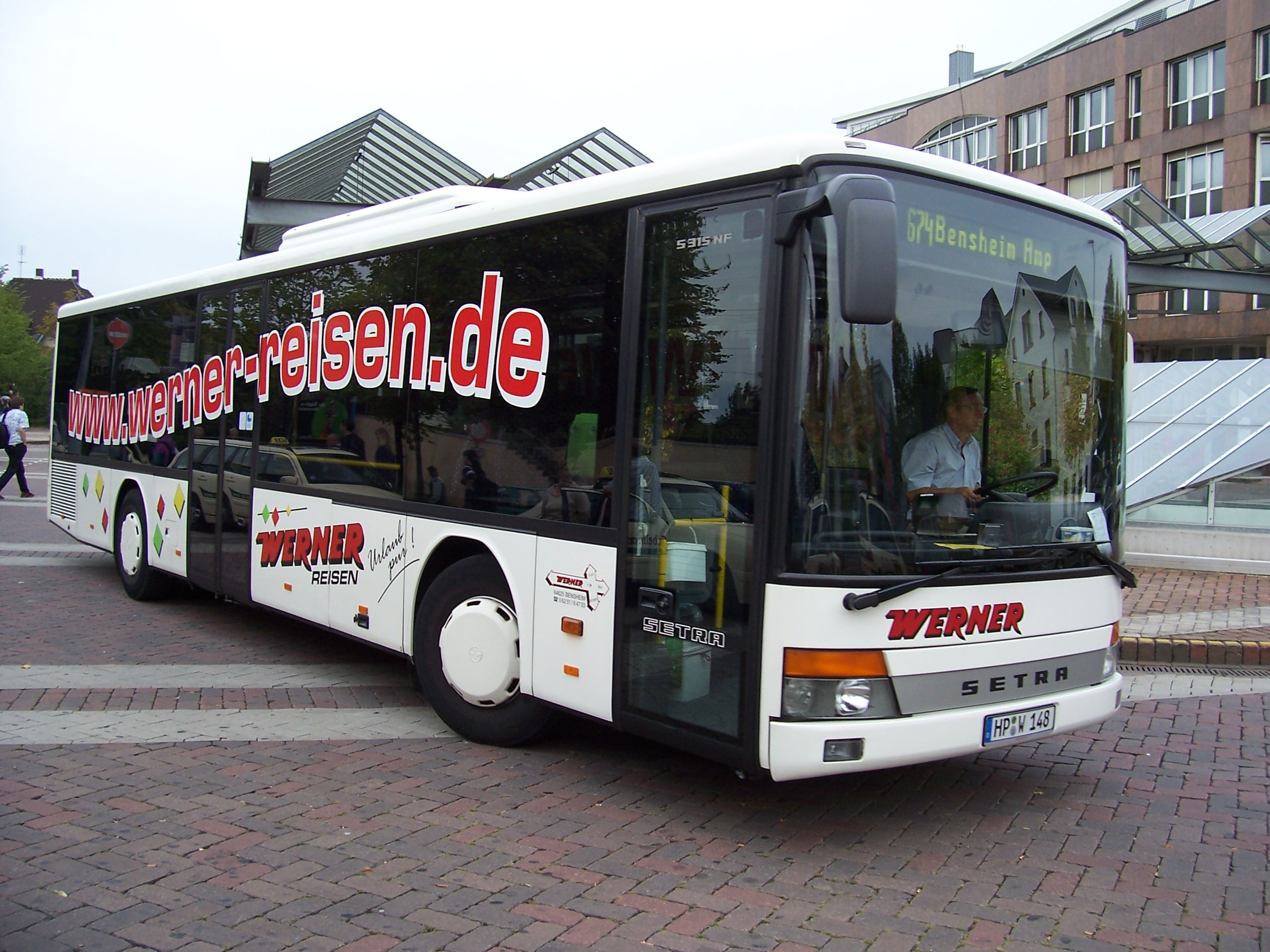
Werner Reisen Setra S 315 NF in Bensheim in September 2005

Abellio Deutschland was formed by the Essen public transit company (EVAG, today part of Ruhrbahn) in 2004. In 2005, British investment company Star Capital Partners purchased a 75% share in Abellio from the City of Essen. In December 2008, both sold their shares to NedRailways. The Abellio brand was later rolled out to replace the NedRailways brand internationally.

== Operations ==
=== Rail ===
As of December 2016, Abellio Deutschland operated 18 lines over 978 kilometres with a fleet of 86 trains.

==== Abellio Rail NRW ====
Abellio Rail NRW was founded in September 2005. It operated several regional railway lines in North Rhine-Westphalia. The NRW network stretched from Gelsenkirchen to Bochum, from Essen to Siegen and Iserlohn via Hagen as well as from Wuppertal to Solingen via Remscheid (line S7).

In December 2016, it commenced operating along the Lower Rhine network between Arnhem in the Netherlands and Düsseldorf / Mönchengladbach and Bocholt. From December 2018, it has operated the Rhine-Ruhr-Express with the Rhein-Hellweg-Express (RE11) and since June 2020, it has operated the NRW-Express (RE1). Both were supposed to run until December 2033.

In December 2016, Abellio NRW commenced operating a 12-year concession to operate Niederrhein-Netz services using the Oberhausen–Arnhem railway covering the Rhein-IJssel-Express (RE19), Arnhem – Zevenaar – Emmerich – Wesel – Oberhausen – Duisburg – Düsseldorf Airport – Düsseldorf and the Emscher-Niederrhein-Bahn (RB35), Mönchengladbach – Krefeld – Wesel. In April 2017 the former was extended into the Netherlands to Arnhem.

In December 2019, it commenced operating lines S2, S3 and S9 of the Rhine-Ruhr S-Bahn network with 29 Stadler Flirts.

On 31 January 2022, Abellio Rail NRW ended its operations. The different contracts were awarded in emergency tenders to other rail companies:

- Rhein-Ruhr-Express (RE1, RE11): National Express
- Ruhr-Sieg-Netz (RE16, RB46, RB91): DB Regio NRW
- S-Bahn Rhein-Ruhr (S2, S3, S9, RB32, RB40, RE49): DB Regio NRW
- Der Müngstener (S7): VIAS Rail
- Niederrhein-Netz (RE19, RB35): VIAS Rail

==== Abellio Rail Mitteldeutschland ====
Abellio Rail Mitteldeutschland commenced operating the Saale-Thuringia-Südharz (STS) electric network since December 2015 on a 15-year contract, over ten lines with a route length of 575 kilometres. The network extends from Halle to Erfurt, Eisenach and Kassel as well as from Leipzig to Erfurt and Saalfeld. In December 2018, Abellio Deutschland commenced operating 12 routes in Saxony-Anhalt. These are being operated by 52 Alstom Coradia Lints.

==== Abellio Rail Baden-Württemberg ====
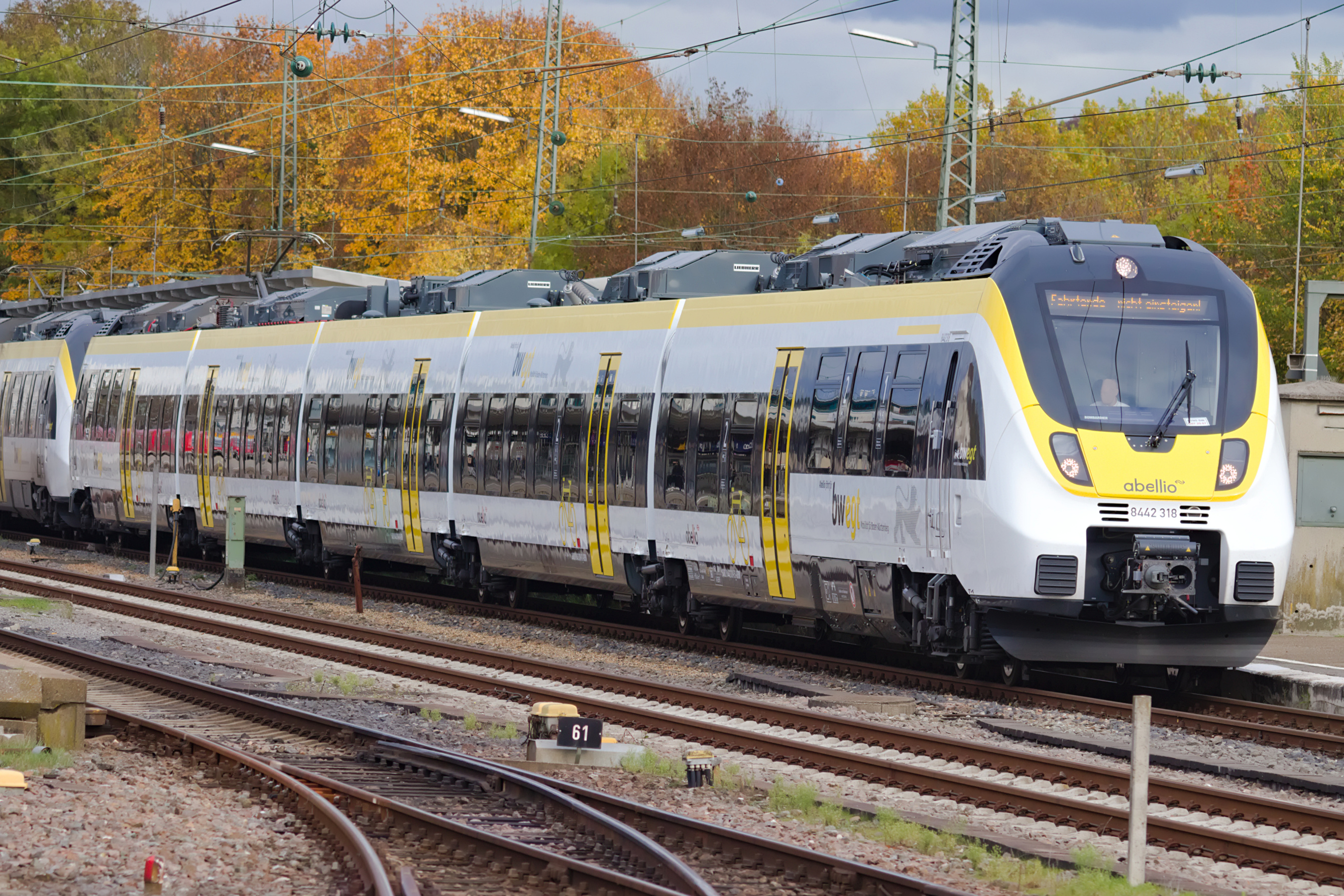
Abellio Rail Baden-Württemberg Bombardier Talent 2 8442 318 at Tübingen in October 2020

From June 2019 Abellio took over some regional train lines in Baden Württemberg under a 13-year contract. Initially a fleet of 43 Bombardier Talent 2s were ordered. This was later increased by five.

Abellio operated the following regional routes in Baden-Württemberg:

- RB 17a Stuttgart - Mühlacker - Pforzheim (- Bad Wildbad*/Wilferdingen-Singen)
- RE/RB 17b Stuttgart - Mühlacker- Bretten - Bruchsal - Heidelberg
- RB 17c Stuttgart - Mühlacker - Bretten - Bruchsal
- RE 10a Mannheim - Mosbach-Neckarelz - Heilbronn - Stuttgart - Tübingen
- RE 10b Mannheim - Sinsheim (Elsenz) - Heilbronn - Stuttgart - Tübingen
- RB 18 Osterburken - Heilbronn - Stuttgart - Tübingen
- IRE 6 Stuttgart - Tübingen

On 1 January 2022, Abellio Rail Baden-Württemberg was taken over by the state-owned Südwestdeutsche Landesverkehrs-AG (SWEG).

==== WestfalenBahn ====
Abellio Deutschland owned a 25% share in WestfalenBahn that was founded in 2005. In July 2017 this was increased to 100%.

=== Bus ===
In April 2013, Abellio Deutschland announced it would focus on rail transport and sell its three bus companies. In November 2013 VM and Werner were sold to Transport Capital with 220 buses. The remaining KVG business was sold to Rhenus Veniro and the District of Bautzen in October 2014 with 84 buses.
