= S7 (Rhine-Ruhr S-Bahn) =

S-Bahn service on the Rhine-Ruhr network, Germany

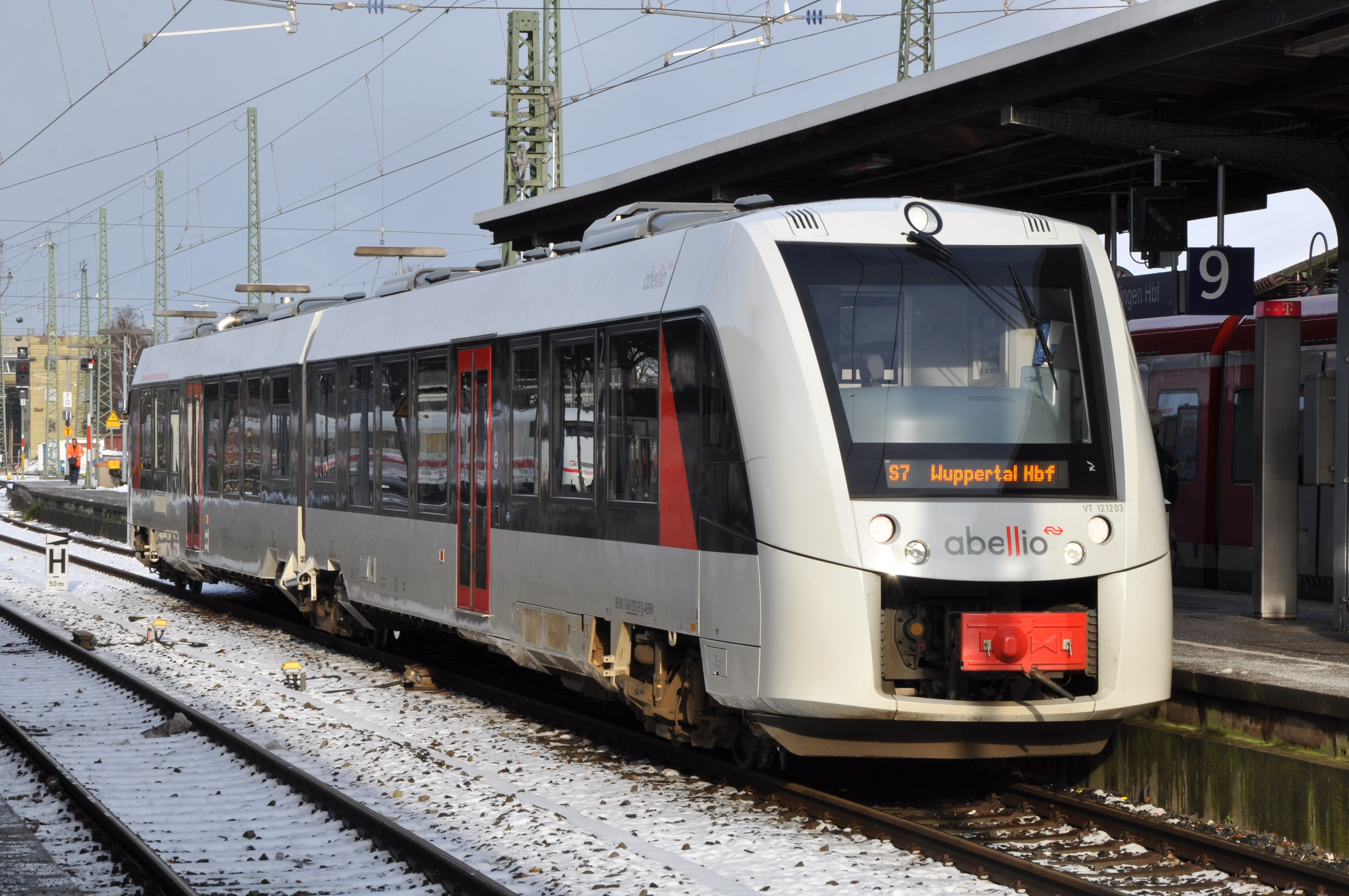
- Alstom Coradia LINT 41 on Line S7 stopped at Solingen before departing for Wuppertal.

Overview
- Termini: Wuppertal; Solingen
- Stations: 14

Service
- Operator(s): RheinRuhrBahn
- Rolling stock: Alstom Coradia LINT 41

Technical
- Line length: 41 km (25 mi)
- Track gauge: 1,435 mm (4 ft 8 1/2 in) standard gauge
- Operating speed: 100 km/h (62 mph)
- Signalling: Indusi

Line S7 is an S-Bahn service on the Rhine-Ruhr network in the German state of North Rhine-Westphalia, between Wuppertal and Solingen. The line has been operated by RheinRuhrBahn since 10 December 2023 at 20-minute intervals, using Alstom Coradia LINT 41 diesel multiple unit vehicles.

The service was previously classified as Regionalbahn service RB47, known as the Der Müngstener, a reference to the Müngsten Bridge, which it crosses and DB Regio had operated it on the same route with DB Class 628 diesel multiple units since 1994. It was also operated at 20-minute intervals, in the evenings and on weekends, every 30 minutes. The S7 was operated by Abellio Deutschland from 2013 to 2022, when it became bankrupt. VIAS then operated the line under an emergency contract 1 from February 2022 to 10 December 2023, when RheinRuhrBahn took over operations to December 2028.

Line S7 runs over lines built by two railway companies:

- from Wuppertal Hauptbahnhof to Wuppertal-Oberbarmen station over the Elberfeld–Dortmund railway, opened by the Bergisch-Märkische Railway Company in 1847 and 1849,
- from Wuppertal-Oberbarmen to Solingen Hauptbahnhof over the Wuppertal-Oberbarmen–Solingen railway, opened in sections by the Bergisch-Märkische Railway Company between 1867 and 1872 and by the Prussian state railways between 1893 and 1897.

There was an earlier line S7 operated by DB Regio, which began at Düsseldorf Airport Terminal station. From there it ran south to Solingen Hbf via Düsseldorf Hbf. With the change to the 2010 timetable on 13 December 2009, line S1 replaced the service between Düsseldorf Hbf and Solingen. The S11 was extended to run to Düsseldorf Airport Terminal station.

== Notes ==
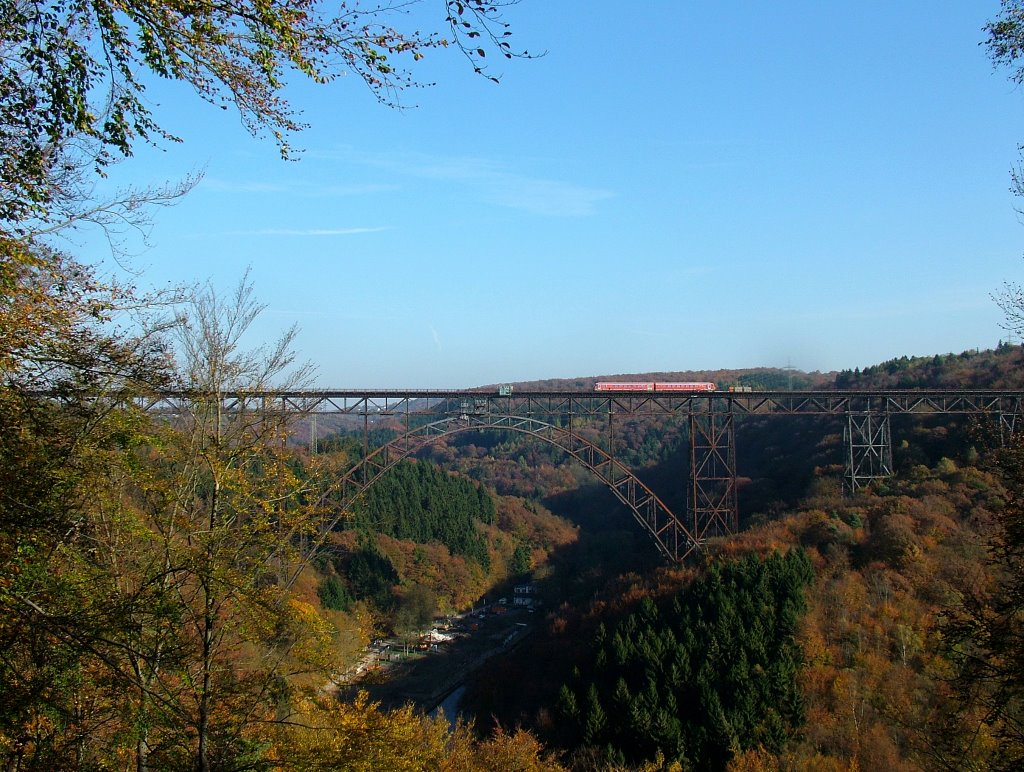
Der Müngstener on Müngsten Bridge
