= Köln Süd station =

Railway station in Germany

Köln Süd
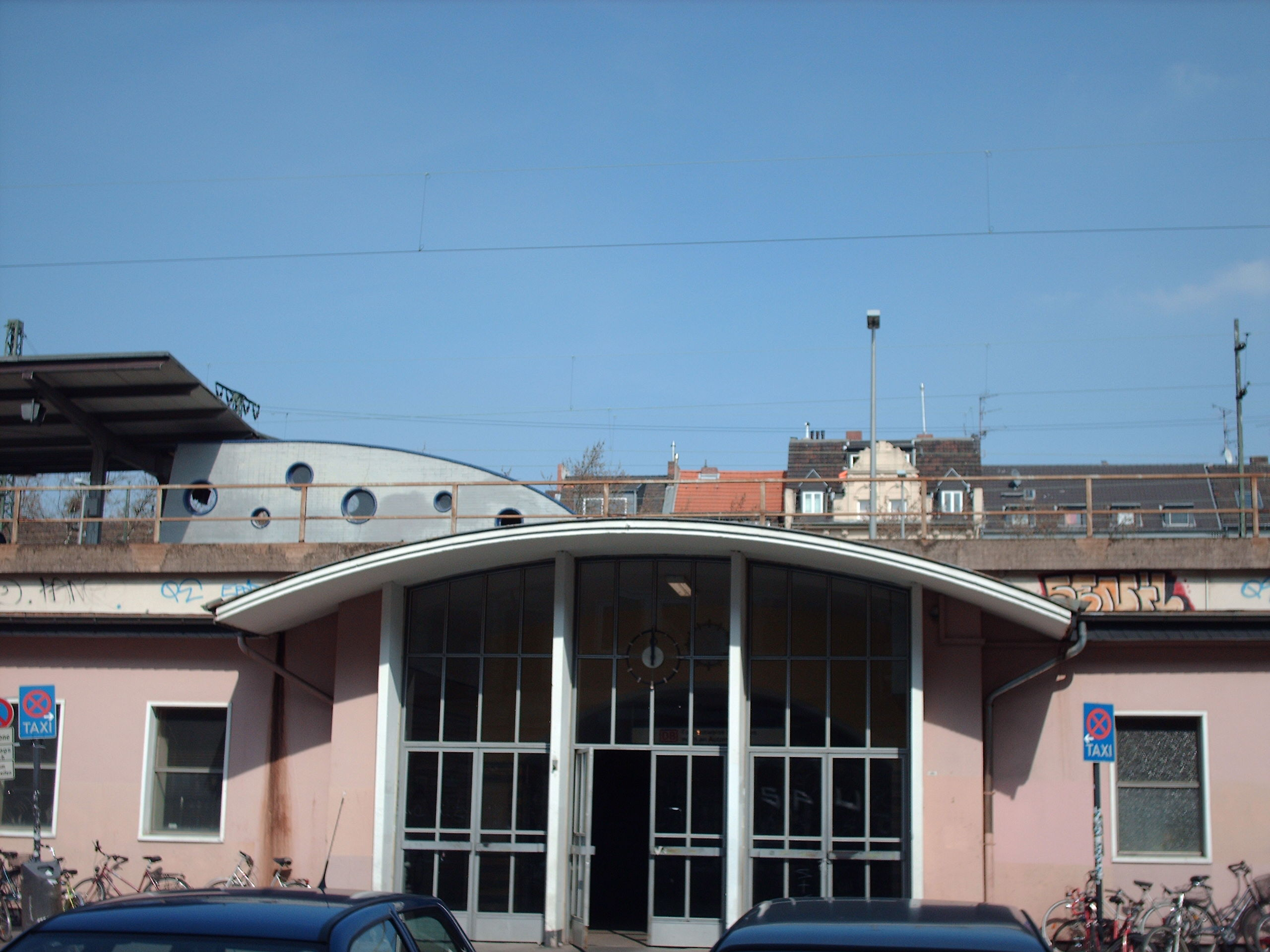
- Station building from the southside

General information
- Location: Otto-Fischer-Str. 2, Cologne, NRW; Germany
- Coordinates: 50°55′39″N 6°56′16″E
- Lines: West Rhine Railway; Cologne freight bypass railway
- Platforms: 4

Construction
- Accessible: No

Other information
- Station code: 3321
- DS100 code: KKS
- IBNR: 8003361
- Category: 4
- Fare zone: VRS: 2100
- Website: www.bahnhof.de

History
- Opened: 1891

Services
Preceding station	DB Regio NRW	Following station
Erftstadt towards Trier Hbf	RE 12	Köln-West towards Köln Messe/Deutz
Erftstadt towards Gerolstein	RE 22	Köln-West towards Köln Messe/Deutz
Hürth-Kalscheuren towards Gerolstein	RB 24	Köln-West towards Köln Messe/Deutz
Preceding station	National Express Germany	Following station
Brühl towards Koblenz Hbf	RE 5 (Rhein-Express)	Köln Hbf towards Wesel
Hürth-Kalscheuren towards Bonn-Mehlem	RB 48 (Rhein-Wupper-Bahn)	Köln-West towards Wuppertal-Oberbarmen
Preceding station	Trans Regio	Following station
Hürth-Kalscheuren towards Mainz Hbf	RB 26	Köln-West towards Köln Messe/Deutz

Other services
Preceding station	Cologne Stadtbahn	Following station
Universität towards Sülz Hermeskeiler Platz	Line 9	Zülpicher Platz towards Königsforst
Location
- Location within North Rhine-Westphalia Location within Germany Location within Europe

Köln Süd (Cologne South) station is located in the southwestern edge of the Innenstadt of Cologne in the district of Neustadt-Süd in the German state of North Rhine-Westphalia. It is located between the streets of Luxemburger Straße and Zülpicher Straße. The station is a stop for regional services on the West Rhine Railway. The Cologne freight railway bypass branches off from the station over the South Bridge; it is also used as needed by passenger trains. The station has four platform tracks at two island platforms and two tracks without platforms, which are used by the intensive freight traffic. It is classified by Deutsche Bahn as a category 4 station.

== History ==
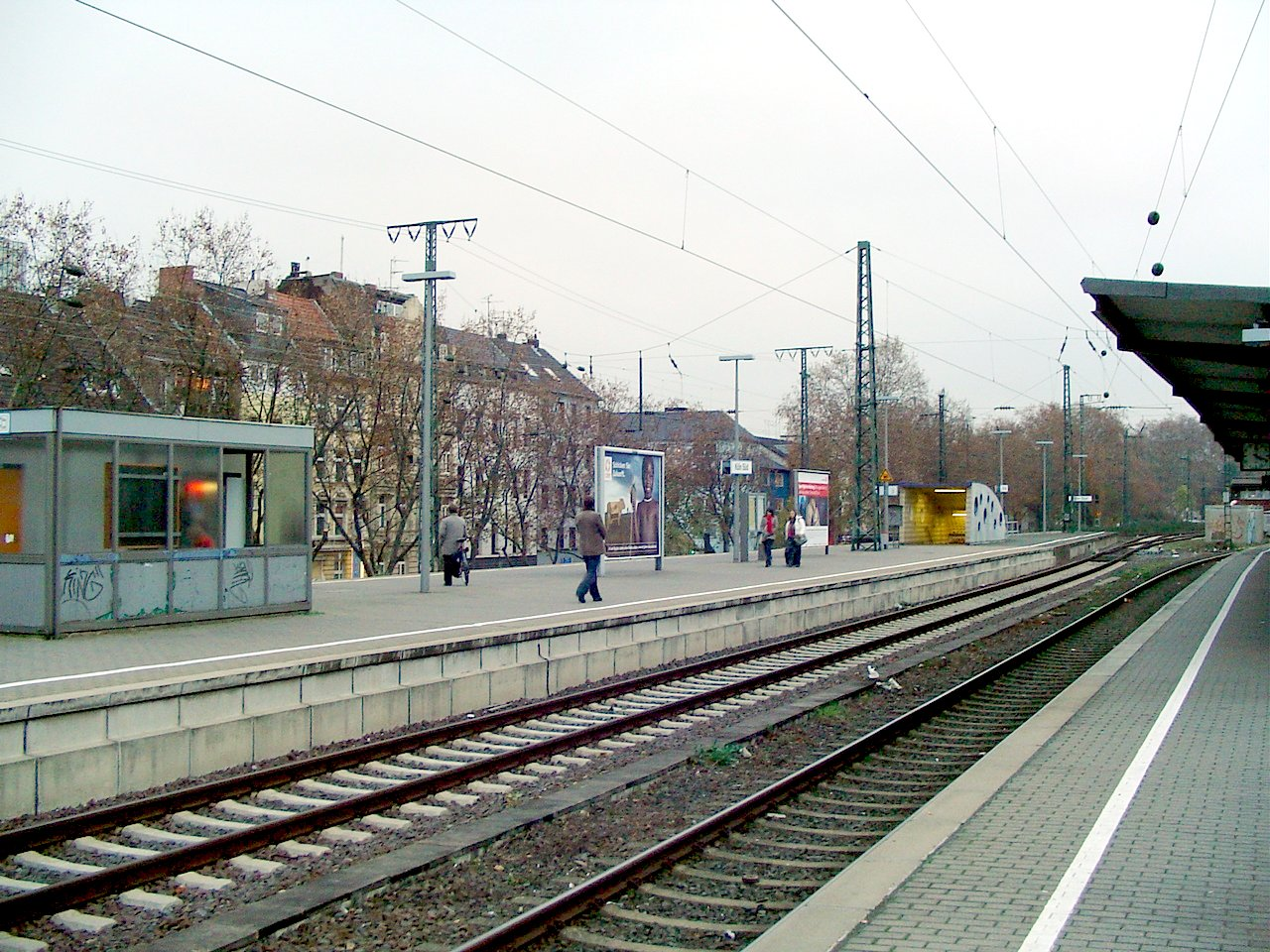
Platforms 3/4 (left) and 1/2 (right)

The original section of the West Rhine Railway (German: Linke Rheinstrecke) was opened in 1844 through the station as the Bonn-Cölner Eisenbahn (Bonn-Cologne Railway) on a direct approach to Cologne that ended at Cöln-Pantaleon station, which was then on the outskirts. With the opening of Central Station (Centralbahnhof, now called the Hauptbahnhof) in 1859, a new line was put into operation, which diverged to the west from the existing line and ran to the Central Station on the inside of the inner ring of fortifications built by Prussia around the city in the 1880s. Beginning with the 1889 renovation of the Central Station, the feeder lines were rebuilt and raised by several metres. Because of the growth of Cologne the route was now in the middle of the city and the stations at Cologne South (Köln Süd, spelt Cöln Süd until 1914) and Cologne West opened in 1891.

The first expansion of the station occurred when the freight line to Cologne Bonntor freight yard was opened in 1896 and the new Rheinauhafen (Rheinau harbor) was put into operation two years later. A further extension occurred in 1910 with the opening of the Cologne freight bypass railway, including the Cologne South Bridge. Two more freight-only tracks were built parallel to the existing line. The freight line starts in Cologne West and runs via Cologne South and Köln Eifeltorfreight yard to Hürth-Kalscheuren. In Cologne South, the line branches off to Cologne Bonntor via the South Bridge and another connection runs from Eifeltor in the south of Cologne via Bonntor towards the bridge.

== Operations ==
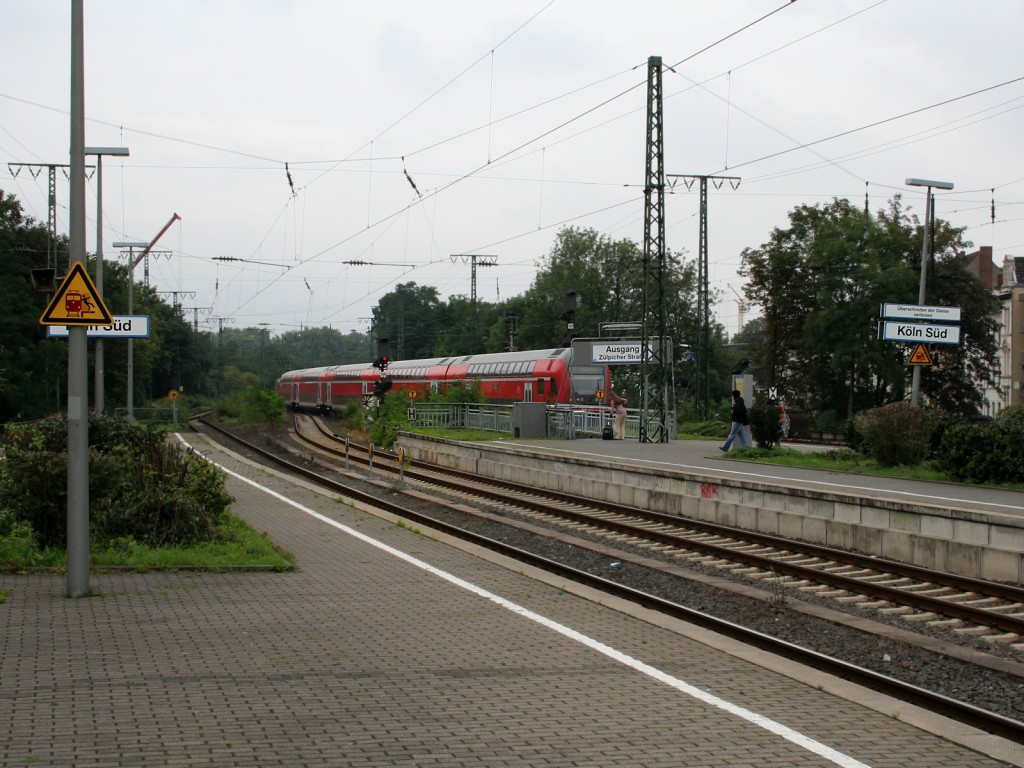
Northwestern passenger exit from platform 3/4 only on the right

The station is used intensively by commuters from the south to Cologne, commuters to Bonn and students from the nearby University of Cologne, making it busy for most of the day.

Platform tracks 1 and 4 are used for traffic to and from Cologne Hbf and Bonn. The intermediate tracks 2 and 3 are used mainly for long-distance passenger traffic (which does not stop at the station) on the West Rhine Railway and for out-of-service operations. They can also be used to allow faster trains to pass.

Track 5, which has no platform, lies to the north of the platforms and is used by freight trains running both towards Cologne Eifeltor and towards the South Bridge. Freight trains run in the opposite direction on track 6, which has a fenced-off wooden platform, which is currently unused. Since the 3/4 platform is generally only used by alighting passengers and a few passengers towards Cologne Hbf, it is equipped only with a simple waiting room, while one third of the 1/2 platform has a roof. Destination displays are installed on tracks 1 and 4, which are used for all scheduled train departures. On both platforms there are also ticket machines; on the 1/2 platform there are additional vending machines for cold drinks and sweets.

=== Problem areas ===
There are problems with the connection of the station to the Stadtbahn network. A flight of stairs leads from the northwestern end of platform 3/4 to the Dasselstraße/Bf Süd stop on Stadtbahn line 9, but platform 1/2 has no direct access to the northwest and passengers can only reach the west via using the underpass at the southeastern end of the station to reach platform 3/4, leading to a long walking route. The tracks of the Vorgebirge Railway (Vorgebirgsbahn, line 18) are at the southeastern end at the station, but the closest stop is at Eifelwall about 250 metres away to the south. The public transport hub of Barbarossaplatz is 350 metres away to the north.

As a result, many passengers take the forbidden and dangerous shortcut across the tracks to change platforms. It was proposed that construction of a staircase costing €1.6 million would start in 2010. This will connect Zülpicher Straße at the northwestern end directly to tracks 1 and 2. While, the station will continue to be not accessible for the disabled, a lift is planned to be installed later. Construction has been delayed.

== Train services ==
The station is served by the following services:

- Regional services RE 5 Rhein-Express Emmerich – Wesel – Oberhausen – Duisburg – Düsseldorf – Cologne – Bonn – Koblenz
- Regional services RE 12 Eifel-Mosel-Express Trier – Gerolstein – Kall – Euskirchen – Cologne
- Regional services RE 22 Eifel-Express Gerolstein - Kall – Euskirchen – Cologne
- Regional services RB 24 Eifelbahn Kall – Euskirchen – Cologne
- Local services RB 26 MittelrheinBahn Cologne – Bonn – Remagen – Andernach – Koblenz – Bingen – Mainz
- Local services RB 48 Rhein-Wupper-Bahn Wuppertal-Oberbarmen – Wuppertal – Solingen – Cologne – Bonn – Bonn-Mehlem
