= Erftstadt station =

Railway station in Liblar, Germany

Erftstadt
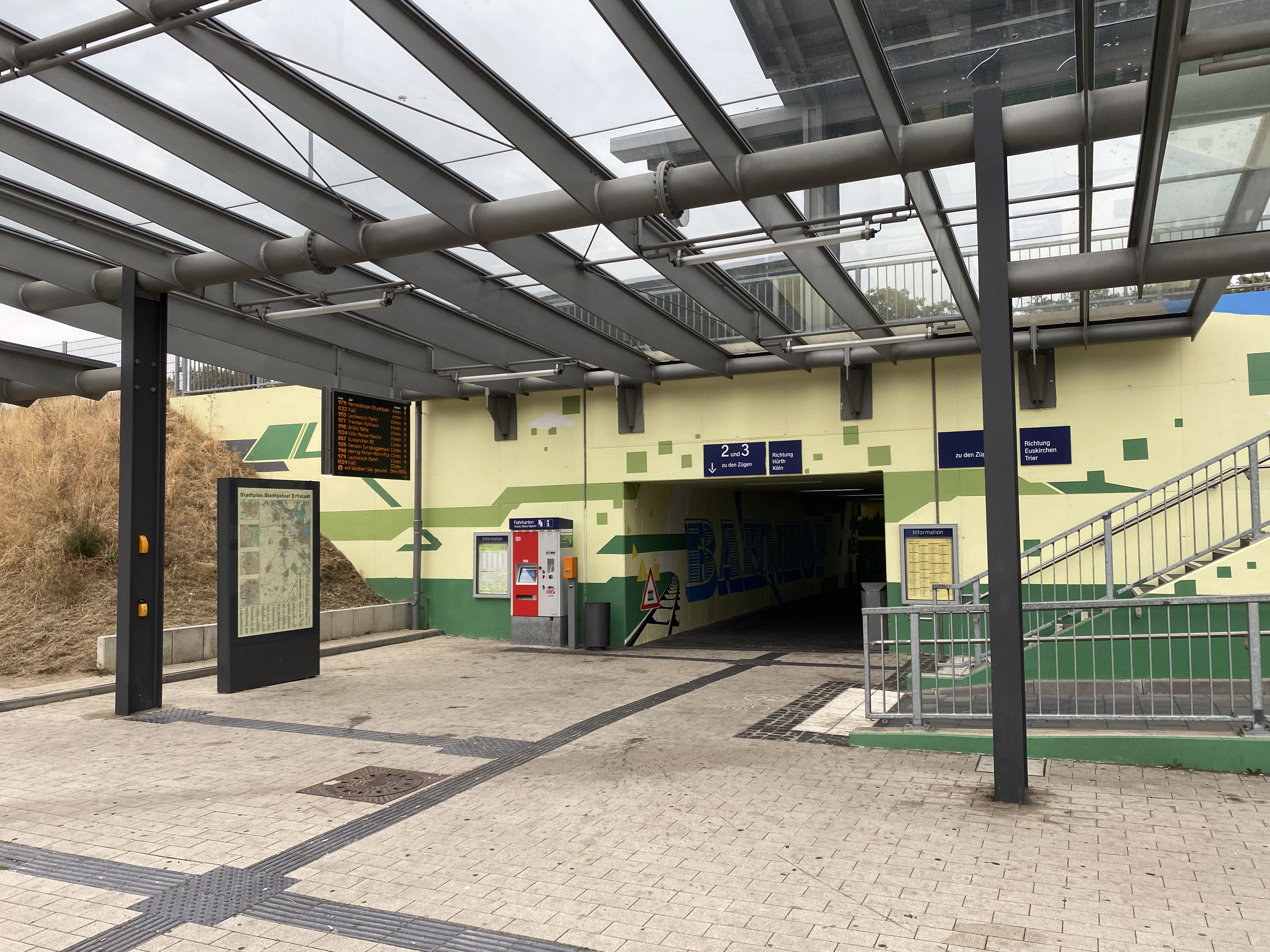

General information
- Location: Bahnhofstr. 136-146, Erftstadt, NRW; Germany
- Coordinates: 50°48′26″N 6°49′59″E
- Owner: Deutsche Bahn
- Operator: DB Netz; DB Station&Service
- Lines: Cologne–Ehrang (11.4 km); Mödrath-Liblar-Brühl railway (closed); Euskirchen District Railway (closed)
- Platforms: 2

Construction
- Accessible: Yes

Other information
- Station code: 1631
- DS100 code: KEST
- Category: 4
- Fare zone: VRS: 2860
- Website: www.bahnhof.de

History
- Opened: 1 October 1875; reopening: November 1984
- Former names: Liblar

Services
Preceding station	DB Regio NRW	Following station
Weilerswist towards Gerolstein	RE 22	Köln Süd towards Köln Messe/Deutz
Weilerswist towards Gerolstein	RB 24	Kierberg towards Köln Messe/Deutz
Location

Erftstadt station is the only passenger station of the town of Erftstadt in the German state of North Rhine-Westphalia and is thus the major transport hub of the town. The station building is located in the district of Liblar. The station is served by Regional-Express services, RE 22 (Eifel Railway) and RE 12 (Eifel-Mosel-Express) and Regionalbahn service RB 24 (Eifelbahn) of the Verkehrsverbund Rhein-Sieg (Rhine-Sieg transport association, VRS), which run from Trier via Kalle to Cologne Hauptbahnhof and together provide services at 30-minute intervals. These services operate on the Eifel Railway (Eifelstrecke).

== Location ==
The station area is located on the south-eastern edge of the town between the Ville chain of lakes in the east and the town centre of Erftstadt in the west. The station itself is located in the southern part of the Liblar district.

== History ==
In 1874, the Rhenish Railway Company (Rheinische Eisenbahn-Gesellschaft, RhE) began the construction of an elaborate station in a historicist style, which was opened in October 1875 with the name of Liblar. The first Rhenish briquettes were made on 1 March 1877. As a result, Liblar station also developed into a substantial freight yard in subsequent years. The station building was enlarged in 1913. In 1938, Liblar station was expanded to 16 tracks due to the ever growing demand for brown coal. By 1960, the last open-pit mines had been closed and dismantled and the export of brown coal from Liblar had ended. In the following years, Liblar station lost its importance. In 1969, as part of a municipal reform and the reorganisation of the district of Euskirchen, several municipalities (including Liblar) were combined and the city of Erftstadt was founded. In 1981, the old station building was demolished by Deutsche Bundesbahn. The modern station was built in the same location as the original station during the upgrade of the Cologne–Trier railway. The station was renamed Erftstadt on 27 May 1990.

== Infrastructure ==
The station has two platform tracks. In addition, the station has parking, bicycle parking, direct access to the bus stop, a taxi stand and a small kiosk. It is served by three regional rail services together providing two services an hour during working days. Rail services are operated by DB Regio Südwest with diesel railcars of classes 620 and 622 with up to three sets coupled. Currently, however, only a maximum of three two-part or two three-part sets are coupled together.

Line	Service	Route	Interval
RE 22	Eifel-Express	Cologne – Erftstadt – Euskirchen – Gerolstein	60 minutes
RB 24	Eifelbahn	Cologne – Erftstadt – Euskirchen – Kall	60 minutes

The station is also served by four bus routes: 920 (Lechenich – Gymnich – Türnich – Kerpen – Sindorf – Horrem, operated by Regionalverkehr Köln at 30- to 60-minute intervals), 975 (Türnich – Horrem – Bergheim – Bedburg – Kaster, operated by Rhein-Erft-Verkehrsgesellschaftat (REVG) at 60-minute intervals), 977 (Liblar – Türnich – Frechen, operated by REVG at 30- to 60-minute intervals), 990 (Lechenich + Brühl – Wesseling, operated by REVG at 30- to 60-minute intervals).
