= Cross Eifel Railway =

Railway line in Germany

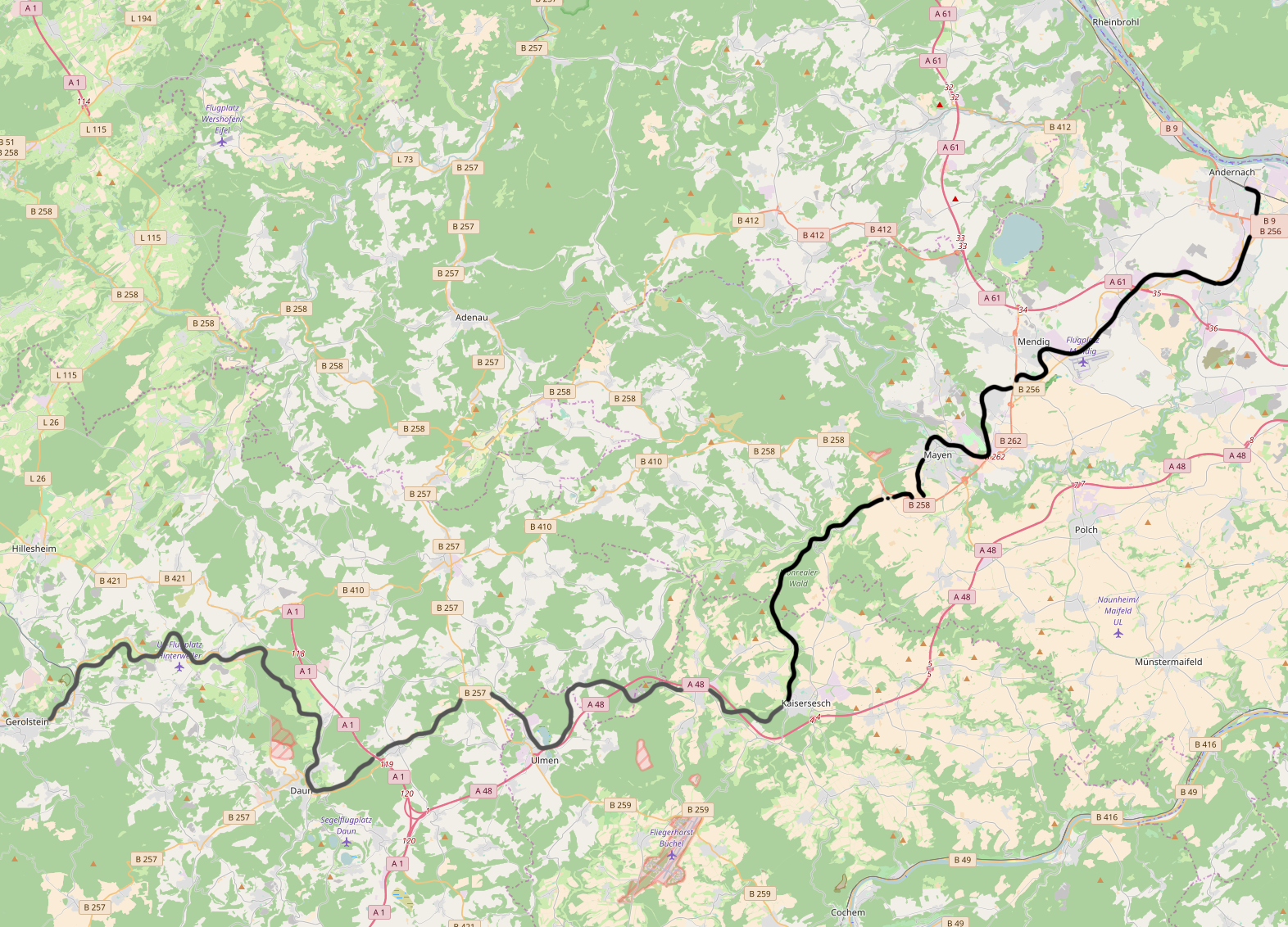

Overview
- Native name: Eifelquerbahn
- Line number: 478 (Andernach–Kaisersesch); 12478 (Kaisersesch–Gerolstein)
- Locale: Rhineland-Palatinate, Germany
- Termini: Andernach; Gerolstein

Service
- Route number: 3005

Technical
- Line length: 94.2 km (58.5 mi)
- Num of tracks: 2: Andernach–Mendig
- Track gauge: 1,435 mm (4 ft 8 1/2 in) standard gauge
- Operating speed: 120 km/h (75 mph) (max)

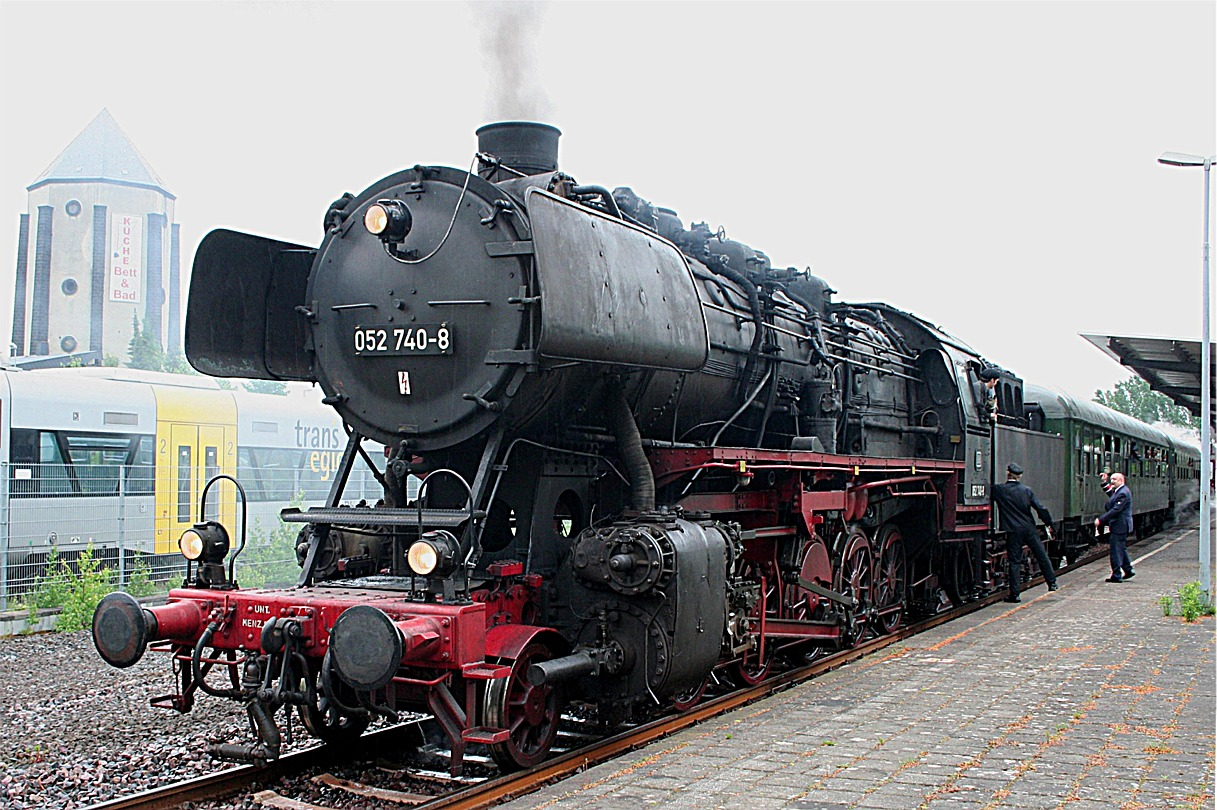
Steam train in Mayen Ost

The Cross Eifel Railway (German: Eifelquerbahn) is a non-electrified railway line between Andernach and Gerolstein in the Eifel in the German state of Rhineland-Palatinate. From Andernach to Mayen Ost (East), it is classified as main line and it has two tracks as far as Mendig.

Services on the Cross Eifel Railway currently operate about every 30 minutes between Andernach and Mayen Ost and continue to Kaisersesch hourly as part of the Lahn-Eifel-Bahn service.

The rail service between Andernach and Kaisersesch operated for a long time under the name of Pellenz-Eifel-Bahn (the Pellenz is a hilly area between Andernach and Mayen) and the section between Kaisersesch and Gerolstein was for a time operated as the Vulkan Eifel-Bahn. This service was discontinued in 2013.

== History ==
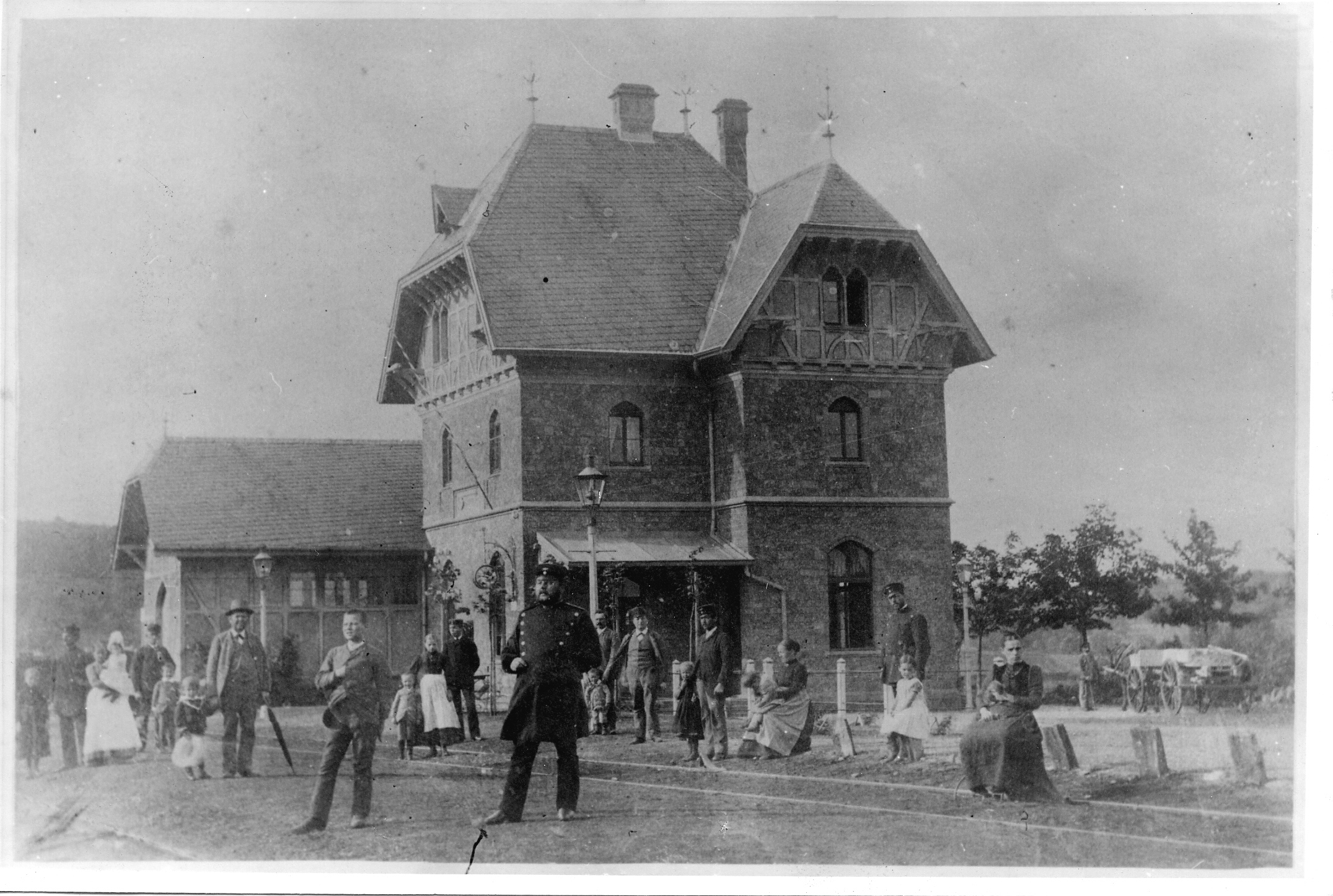
Kottenheim station (1892)

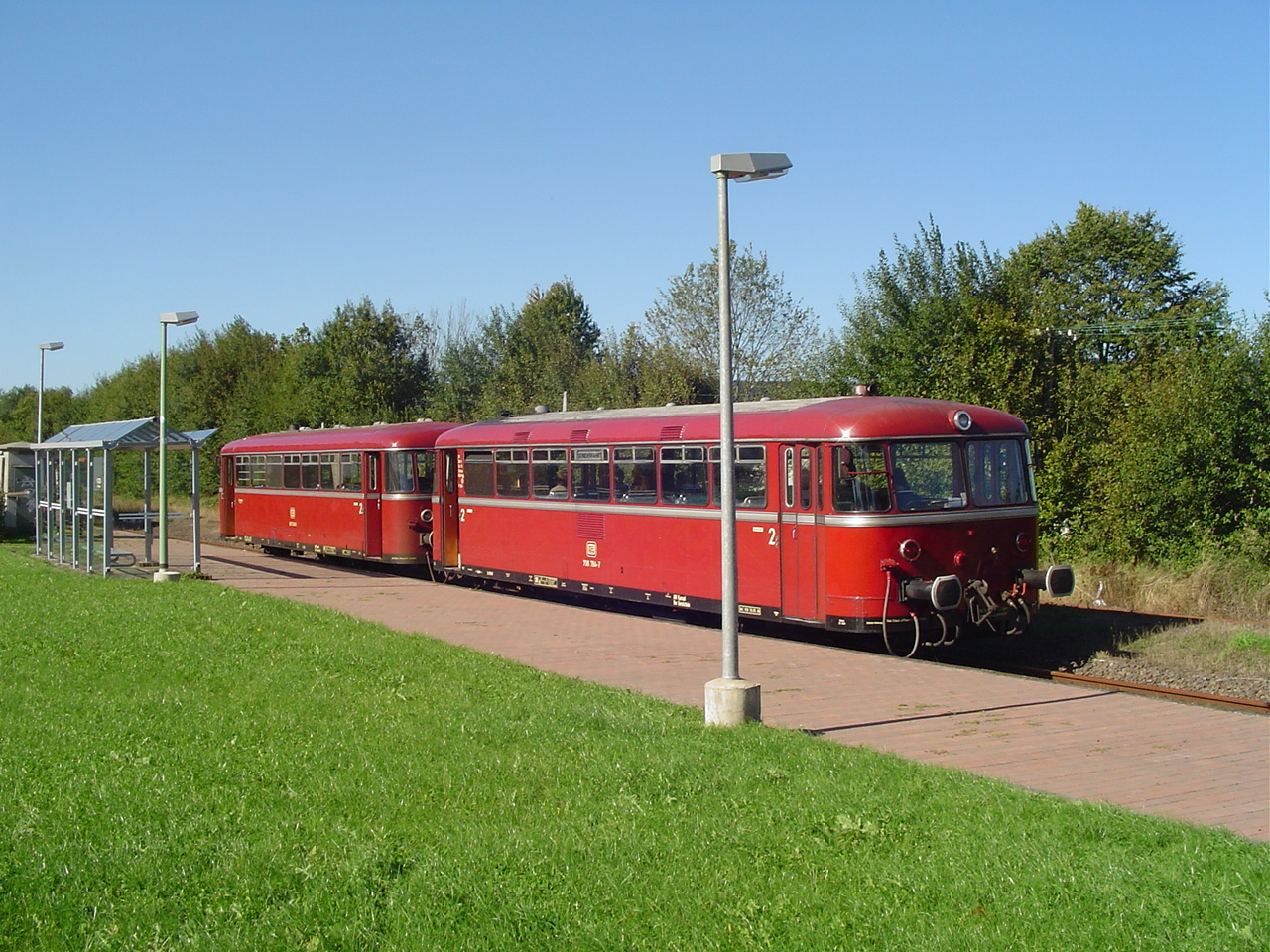
Cross Eifel Railway in Ulmen (2006)

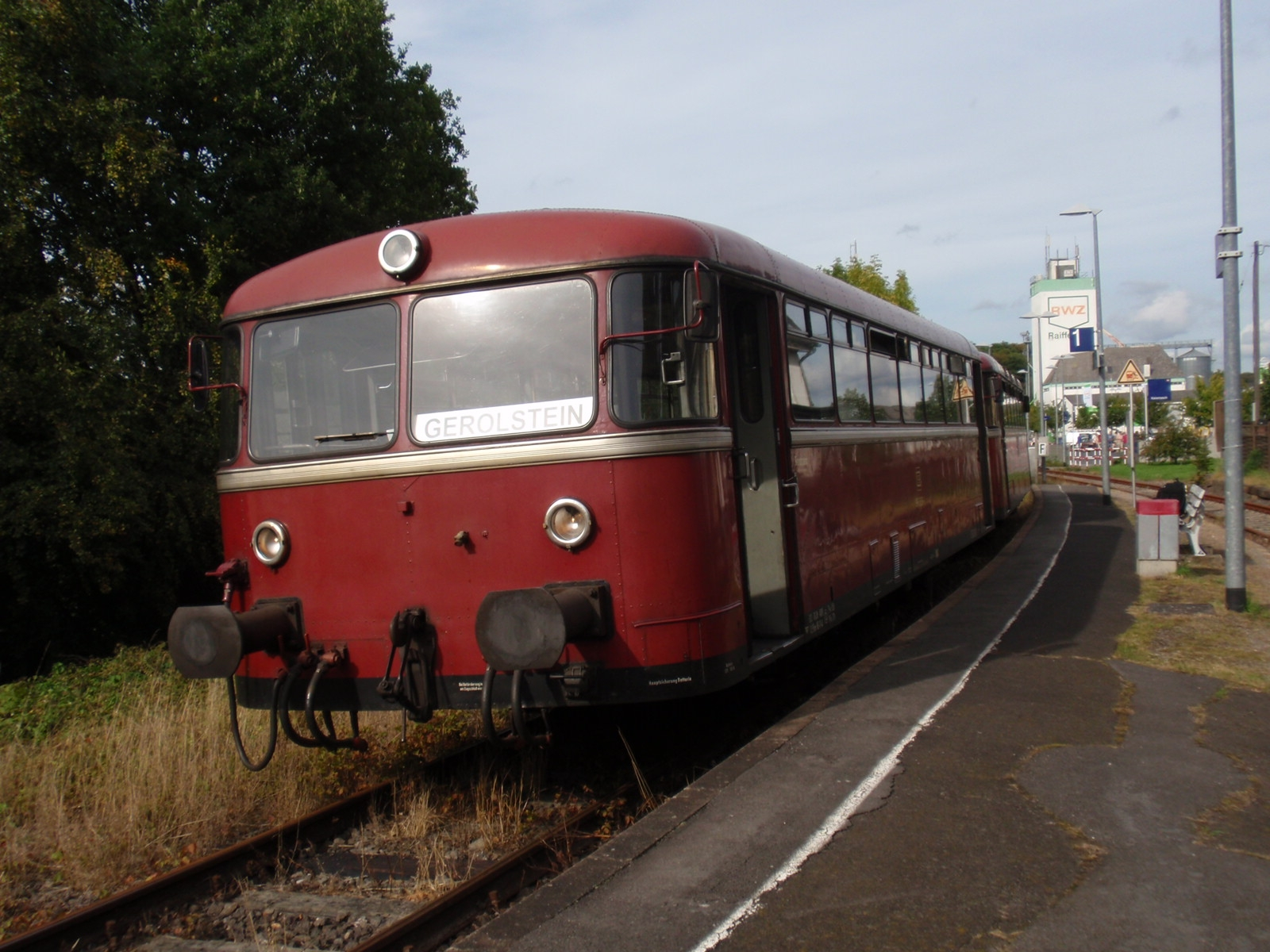
On 10 September 2011, a railbus in Kaisersesch awaits the return trip to Gerolstein

The Cross Eifel Railway was opened in several stages, with the first section opening from Andernach to Niedermendig on 1 April 1878. The second section opened from Niedermendig to Mayen Ost on 29 May 1880 and the third section opened from Mayen Ost to Gerolstein on 15 May 1895. The building of a connection to Karden between Mayen West and Monreal was considered. From about 1880 the Cross Eifel Railway was administered by the Eisenbahndirektion (railway division of) Cologne of the Prussian state railways.

At the end of the Second World War, the line from Andernach to Mayen Ost was reopened by 8 April 1945. The part from Mayen Ost to Gerolstein did not follow until 29 August 1946.

On 13 January 1991, passenger traffic from Gerolstein to Mayen West was discontinued. Freight transport was initially continued between Ulmen und Kaisersesch; it was abandoned on 1 January 1998 between Gerolstein and Ulmen and on 28 May 2000 between Mayen and Kaisersesch.

On 6 August 2000, a few months after trans regio had taken over the operation between Andernach and Mayen, the line was reopened for passenger traffic from Mayen West to Kaisersesch.

The section from Gerolstein to Kaisersesch was used for tourist traffic in the season from May to October from 2 June 2001. Services ran at two-hour intervals on Sundays and holidays only; later the excursions also ran on Saturdays. Because of the poor state of the line, services were terminated in Ulmen. A daily tourist service ran in the summer from Gerolstein to Daun from 18 July 2005. After restoring and securing the section between Ulmen and Kaisersesch, the Cross Eifel Railway was once again open to traffic from 26 April 2008.

In an accident on 6 June 2009 at an open level crossing near Hohenfels, a railbus collided with a truck-trailer combination. The crowded train derailed and fell down a slope. In all, there were 26 injured, five people were severely injured and the train driver and guard were seriously injured.

=== Reactivation plans and closure of the infrastructure ===
In the course of the pre-planning for the Rhineland-Palatinate regular interval timetable to be introduced in 2015, several options were investigated to reactivate the Kaisersesch–Gerolstein section, which is not currently served by regular rail passenger transport. This study showed that the reactivation of part of the route would not to be useful in macroeconomic terms. Only the start-up of the entire route had a benefit-cost ratio above one and could thus be supported by the state. In this case, the journey time between Andernach and Gerolstein would be around two hours and patronage of up to 1900 passengers per day was estimated. The costs were then estimated to be about €20 million. On 9 June 2009, the SPNV Nord/Rheinland-Pfalz (north Rhineland-Palatinate municipal association for rail transport) approved the complete reactivation of the Cross Eifel Railway for local public transport by December 2014. However, the cost estimate had to be corrected to €40 million in 2011 after a revision of the cost-benefit analysis, which meant that the reactivation of the overall route was no longer economically viable.

On the basis of the new figures, the municipality of Daun expressed its opposition to the reactivation of the Gerolstein–Daun–Kaisersesch section of the Cross Eifel Railway in December 2012. The previous operator announced shortly afterwards that it had not requested an extension of its operating license after 2013.

Since 1 January 2013, the infrastructure of the Cross Eifel Railway has been partly closed to traffic, because train operations are not possible without a new bridge at Pelm. This also eliminates the steam trains operated by Lokschuppen Gerolstein; the associated Anheizparty ("heating party") was replaced by the Lokschuppen-Sommer ("locomotive shed summer").

In the autumn of 2016, a separate cost-benefit analysis for the disused Kaisersesch–Gerolstein section was to be carried out on a basis that will allow local authorities and districts to decide on the future of the line. In this case, the estimated rehabilitation costs of €24 million (of which €6 million alone was for the necessary construction of the Pelm bridge) are likely to play a decisive role.

== Course of the line ==
The Cross Eifel Railway follows the Eifel Railway from Gerolstein to Pelm closely, then branches off to the north-east and runs via Daun, Ulmen. Kaisersesch to Mayen. From there, it runs through several curves to Andernach, where it runs to the north to connect with the Left Rhine line.

The whole line is owned by DB Netz. The Ulmen–Kaisersesch section was finally returned to traffic after a comprehensive refurbishment in April 2008 for a railway station festival in Ulmen, but it is currently out of operation.

=== Former railways ===
- Wengerohr–Daun railway:
  from Daun via Manderscheid-Pantenburg to Wittlich (restored, now a rail trail)
- Koblenz-Lützel–Mayen Ost railway:
  from Mayen-Ost via Polch and Ochtendung to Koblenz-Lützel (now a rail trail from Mayen to Ochtendung)
  connecting to the Polch-Münstermaifeld branch line (restored, now a rail trail)

== Operations ==
=== Andernach – Mayen – Kaisersesch ===
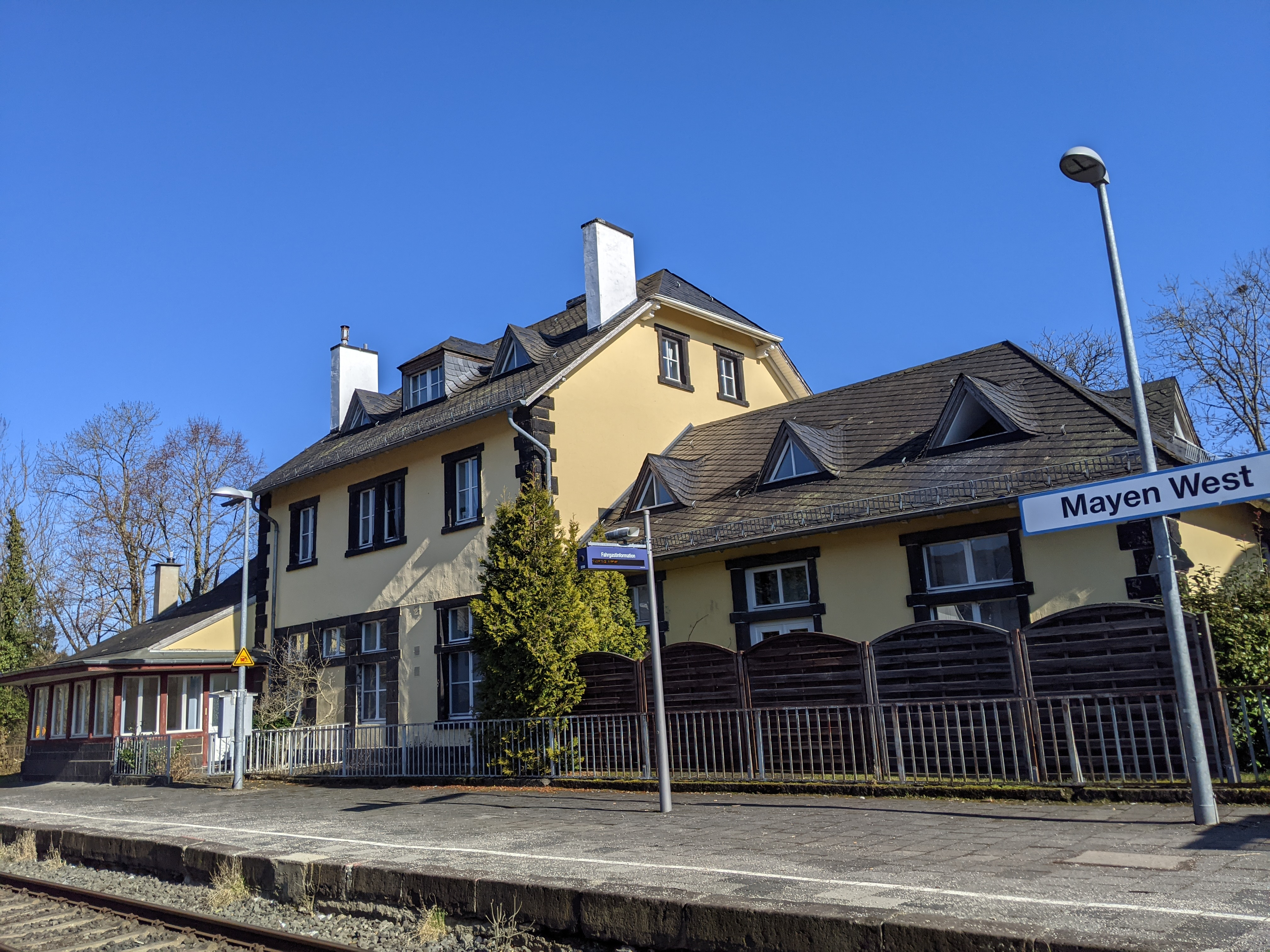
Mayen West station

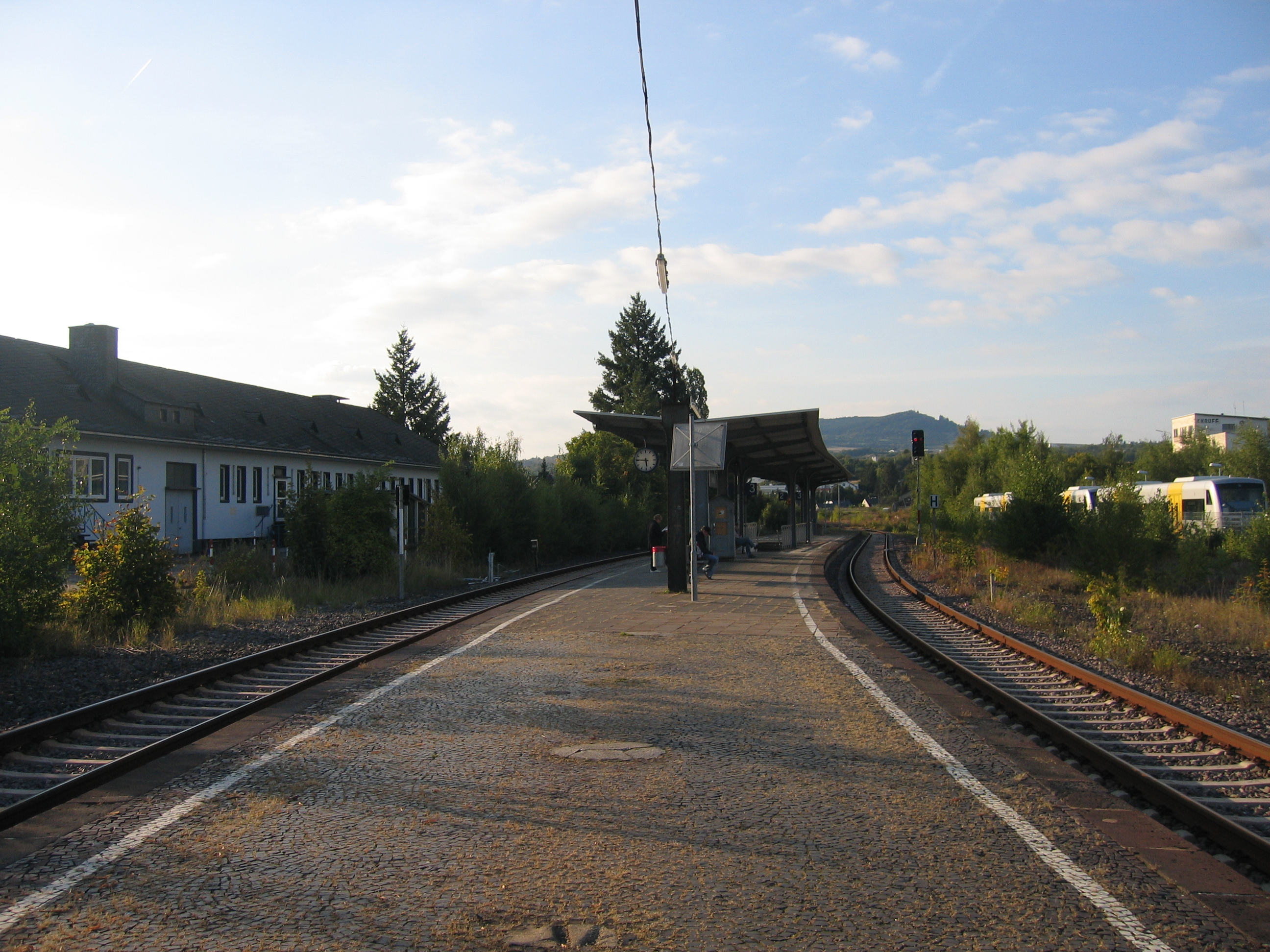
Mayen east station (former interchange to Koblenz-Lützel (via Polch)

.

Trans regio operated passenger services on the line, including the reactivated section between Mayen and Kaisersesch, with Regio-Shuttles from 28 May 2000 to about 13 December 2008.

Since 14 December 2008, it has been operated by DB Regio with class 628.3 (double-deck) sets at hourly intervals. The trains cross in Mayen Ost, although the symmetry minute of the line is about four minutes earlier than usual.

Since the timetable change in December 2014, the service operated by DB Regio continues to operate as the Lahn-Eifel-Bahn hourly from Kaisersesch via Mayen to Andernach (RB 38) as well as from Mayen via Andernach to Koblenz and continues to Limburg an der Lahn (as RB 23). This gives an approximately 30-minute cycle in both directions on the section between Mayen and Andernach, as well as significantly improving the accessibility of the Koblenz inner city from the stations of the Cross Eifel Railway. At the same time the class 628 cars, which had been used since 2008, were replaced by class 643 (Bombardier Talent), class 648 (Alstom Coradia LINT 41) and class 640 (LINT 27) railcars.

=== Kaisersesch – Daun – Gerolstein ===
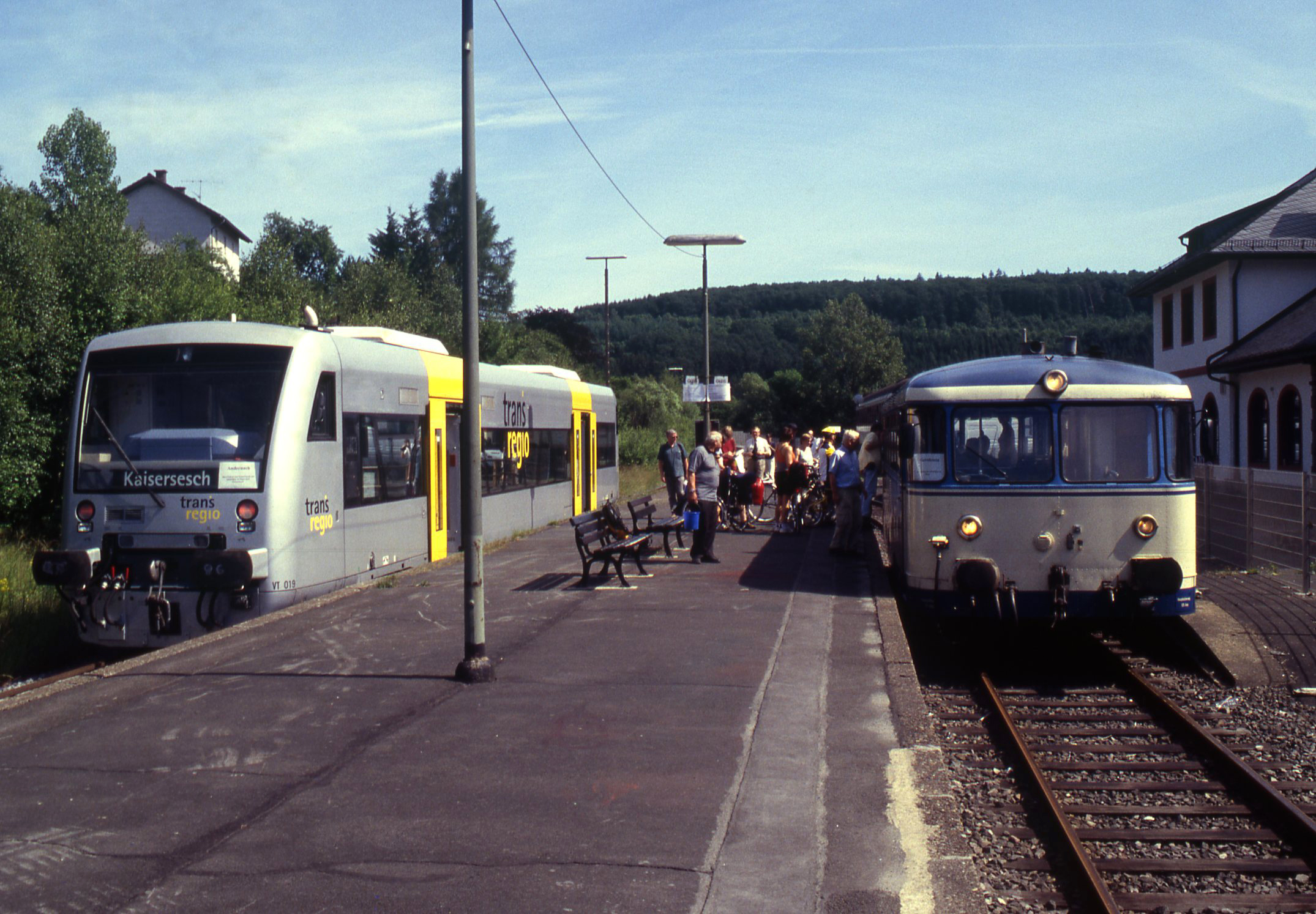
Daun station

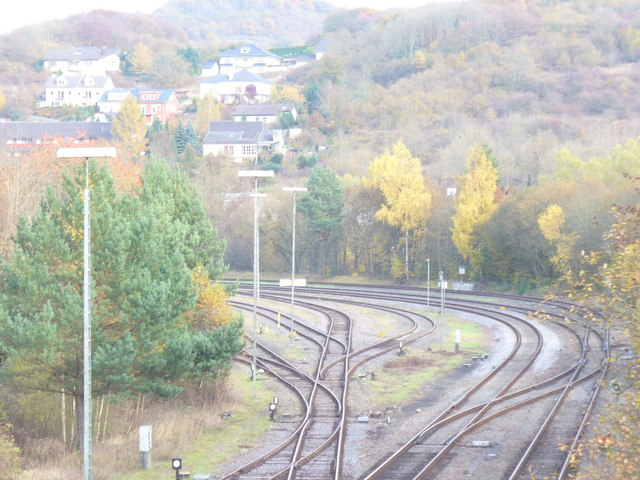
Near Pelm, almost west side end of Eifelquerbahn

The Vulkan-Eifel-Bahn (VEB) operated the section of line from Kaisersesch to Pelm from 2000 and operated a two-hour cycle on weekends and public holidays from May to October using railbuses. In the summer months services were also operated between Gerolstein and Ulmen during the week. In addition, during the summer holidays on Wednesdays, a steam train, consisting of a class 52 steam locomotive and historical passenger cars, ran between Gerolstein and Ulmen.

At the end of 2012, the political committees rejected the investment in the rail infrastructure, so the VEB announced that from 2013 no excursions would run on this section of the line.

At the end of March 2013, it became known that the state of Rhineland-Palatinate would provide €13 million for the repair of the infrastructure to enable the tourist excursions to run again.

== Transport associations ==
Between Andernach and Laubach-Müllenbach as well as in Ulmen, the line is located in the area of the transport association Verkehrsverbund Rhein-Mosel (VRM), between Berenbach and Gerolstein as well as Höchstberg-Uersfeld in the area of the transport association Verkehrsverbund Region Trier (VRT), although currently the line is out of service between Kaisersesch and Gerolstein.

== Planning ==
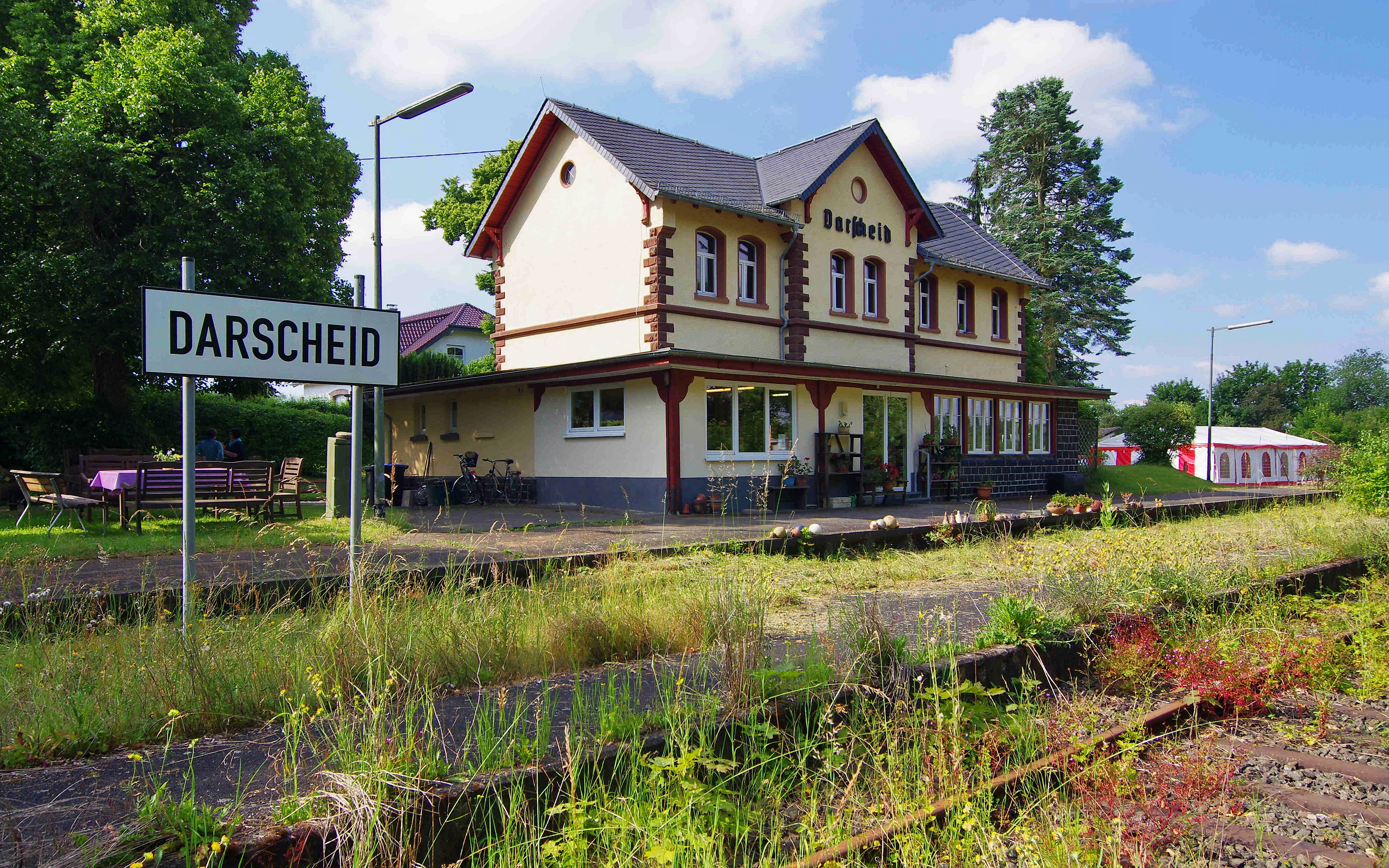
Darscheid station

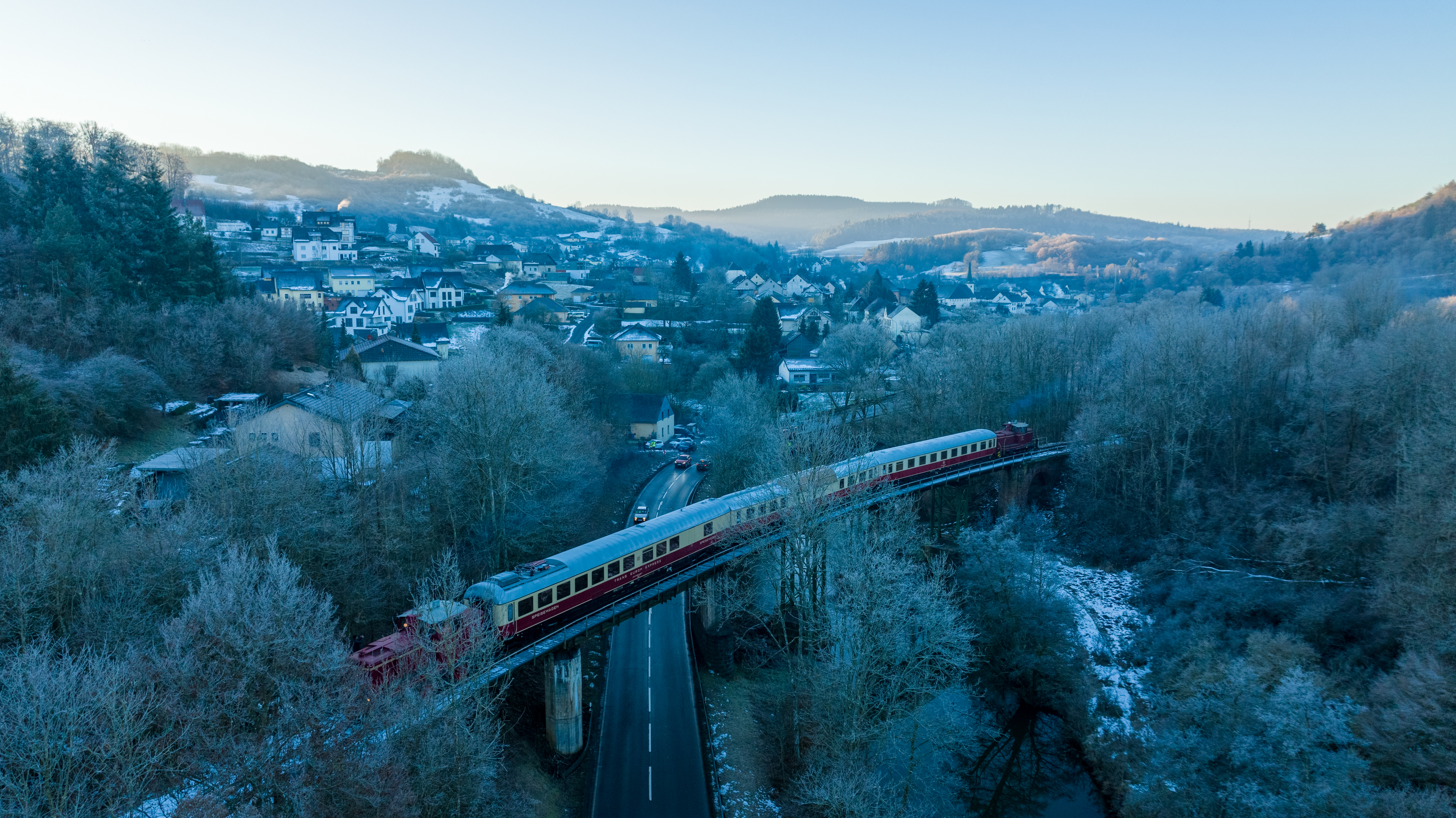
A special train on Eifelquerbahn's Kyll bridge

Two further stations are to be built up to the middle of the 2020s: Andernach Süd (in the Straße Leibnizhof area) and Mayen-Brückentor (at the level crossing on Straße Auf der Eich). The SPNV Nord assumes daily patronage of 700 (Andernach Süd) and 500 (Mayen-Brückentor).

== Notes ==
=== Sources ===
- Hans-Peter Kuhl (1996). Die Eifelquerbahn Mayen-Gerolstein (in German). Gülzow: Lok-Rundschau. ISBN 3-931647-02-1.
