= Jünkerath station =

Railway station in Jünkerath, Germany

Jünkerath
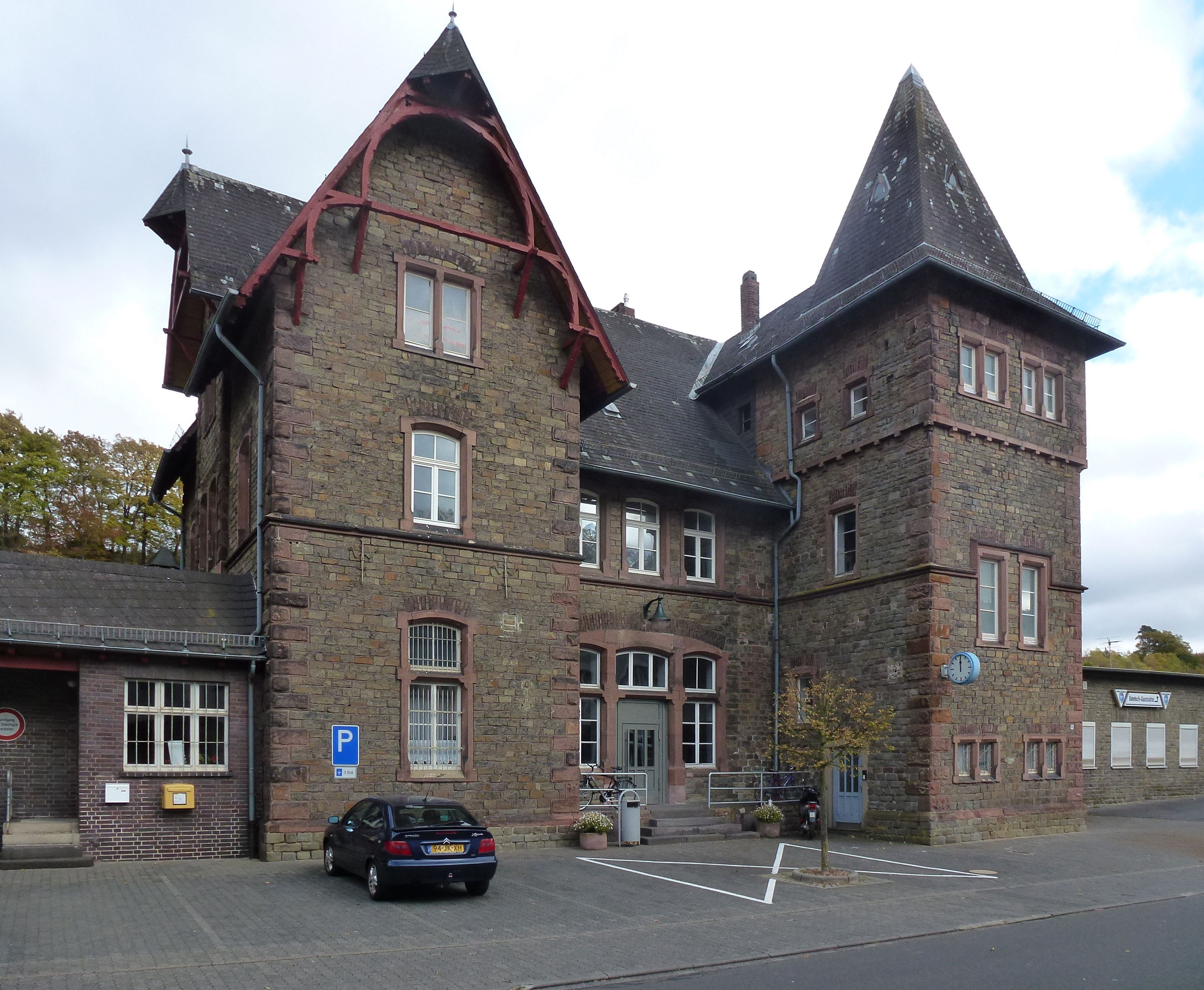
- Jünkerath station

General information
- Location: Bahnhofstraße 9, Jünkerath, Rhineland-Palatinate; Germany
- Coordinates: 50°20′41″N 6°34′51″E
- Owner: Deutsche Bahn
- Operator: DB Netz; DB Station&Service
- Lines: Hürth-Kalscheuren–Ehrang (KBS 474; km 83.0); Lissendorf–Dümpelfeld (closed); Jünkerath–Weywertz (closed; km 0.0)
- Platforms: 3

Construction
- Accessible: Yes
- Architectural style: Historicism

Other information
- Station code: 3069
- DS100 code: KJU
- IBNR: 8003135
- Category: 5
- Fare zone: VRT: 524; VRS: 2990 (VRT transitional tariff)
- Website: www.bahnhof.de

History
- Opened: November 1870

Services
Preceding station	DB Regio NRW	Following station
Gerolstein towards Trier Hbf	RE 12	Dahlem (Eifel) towards Köln Messe/Deutz
Lissendorf towards Gerolstein	RE 22	Dahlem (Eifel) towards Köln Messe/Deutz
Lissendorf towards Gerolstein	RB 24 selected trains only	Dahlem (Eifel) towards Köln Messe/Deutz
Location

Jünkerath station is located on the Eifel Railway in Jünkerath in the German state of Rhineland-Palatinate. It was once an important junction station, but it has lost this importance as a result of line closures and now only serves as a stop on the line between Cologne and Gerolstein.

== History ==
For topographical, socio-economic and political reasons, the Rhenish Railway Company (Rheinische Eisenbahn-Gesellschaft) decided at a relatively late date to build a railway line through the Eifel. In the meantime the cities of Trier and Cologne had been connected to the rail network. Thus the construction of the line began in November 1867, and almost exactly three years later, Gerolstein station was built. The following rapid construction of the line to Trier was due to the Franco-Prussian War, as the railway company expected possible military traffic. The connection to Trier was already usable on 15 June 1871. At this time, the Eifel Railway demonstrated its strategic military importance for the first time. The station was built on the territory of the municipality of Glaadt, which had also been the location of the Jünkerather Gewerkschaft (Jünkerath iron works) since 1687. The present municipality of Jünkerath was established around 60 years after the opening of the station.

Its importance increased in the early 20th century with the construction of the Dümpelfeld–Lissendorf railway (Mittellere Ahrtalbahn—"Central Ahr Valley Railway") and the Cross-Venn Railway (Vennquerbahn), which branched off at the station. Jünkerath developed along with the nearby Gerolstein station into an important junction station in the Eifel. Both the freight and passenger traffic grew rapidly, which meant that Jünkerath station was constantly expanded. There were four signal boxes and a Bahnbetriebswerk (locomotive depot) on the site. It was also particularly important for its connection to Belgium. As a result, it now served as an important marshalling yard for train formation.

In particular, in the First World War, Jünkerath played an important role, since the station was at a strategically-important position for trains to the Western Front. It is estimated that up to 50,000 soldiers, 3000 horses and 1000 tonnes of supplies were transported over the Ahr Valley Railway (Ahrtalbahn) alone. It was important to keep stays in the station as short as possible, so the station had to be efficient. By 1918, up to 1000 soldiers a day were sent to Belgium along with rations.

In 1923, Jünkerath station was also affected by the French and Belgian occupation of the Ruhr. The railway officials abandoned their offices and took part in the resistance in the Ruhr. The French withdrew from Jungkerath only in 1925.

In the Second World War, the station was once again of great importance because of its strategic location for the building of the Siegfried Line (Westwall). There was a boom in traffic at the station as a result of the many freight and passenger trains to Belgium. Thus in 1939, over 850 railway workers were involved in operations at the station. When the station was bombed in air raids in 1944, the bombs also hit a train with Soviet prisoners of war. The station was not only affected by enemy attacks: on 12 September 1944, a damaged and out of control V1 crashed at the station. But even then the station was not spared from air raids. In February 1945, the Wehrmacht finally took over the station and used it as a base for guarding the bridges and tunnels in the region.

After the war, the station was like a battlefield. In July 1945, workers were asked to report to their workplaces to be able to participate in the reconstruction of the station. The debris was sufficient for the reconstruction of three signal boxes, because as much debris as possible was reused. Since there were no locomotives in the station, the ballast waggons had to be pushed by hand. The points, tracks and signals were also recovered and repaired.

In 1948, the station was reopened as a marshalling yard and junction station. From 1950 onwards the station regained its former importance in freight and passenger traffic. However, from the middle of the 1950s onwards, it declined again. In 1959, the railway reorganised its operations and the Gerolstein locomotive depot was redesignated as an outpost of the Jünkerath locomotive depot.

As a result of the structural change in the region, passenger transport on the Cross-Venn Railway ended on 26 May 1963; almost exactly ten years later, on 3 June 1973, passenger traffic ended on the Dümpelfeld–Lissendorf railway to Dümpelfeld. On 1 February 1979, the Jünkerath station office was dissolved. From this point onwards, the tracks were reconstructed in the station and on the branch lines. The line to Hillesheim was closed in 1982. However, Jungkerath retained its importance as a marshalling yard for train formation up to the 1990s. In 2003, the line to Losheimergraben was closed, which had been maintained for strategic reasons to link the military training camp in Elsenborn. The marshalling yard was closed in 2004.

Since then the railway systems have been considerably reduced and the station building has been neglected. In 2011 to 2016, complex modernisation measures were carried out at the station, which were carried out within the framework of a program funded by Deutsche Bahn, the state of Rhineland-Palatinate and the regional transport association; €100 million was made available to renovate the whole station.

== Railway station buildings and railway lands ==
The station building has been a protected monument since 1978. The main building consists mainly of red crushed stone and has a separate auxiliary building. The building demonstrates the former importance of Jünkerath as a railway junction and an important location for the iron industry in the Eifel region. It also conforms to the uniform style of the station buildings built along the Eifel railway. These splendid "palaces" (Schlösser) were financed from the money that France had to pay as reparations to Germany after the Franco-Prussian War.

Since Jünkerath station was originally built as a station for the Jünkerath Iron Works, the track layout and the locomotive shed were oversized for the station's secluded location, particularly when it was first built. As early as 1871, the Iron Works had its own connecting track to the station. Because of its steadily increasing traffic, the station was extended several times in the following years. At the beginning of the 20th century, the station had four signal boxes.

During the modernisation carried out from 2011 to 2016, a new underpass, new seating, new clocks and new information displays were built. In addition, the platforms were raised to 76 centimetres to give full accessibility. In addition, the entire station was signed as a non-smoking station.

A passenger survey was carried out as part of these measures. The survey revealed that 95 percent of passengers use the trains only from Monday to Friday. Around half of the workforce commutes to the workplace. 54 people walked, 94 people travelled by car and 32 people travelled by bus. 260 people supported the expansion of the Park&Ride facilities in the station. Therefore, new parking lots were built during the upgrade on the railway station. This cost about €569,000, of which the municipality of Jünkerath itself provided about €149.000.

The rebuilding measures have always been managed to ensure that train traffic is not hindered. The timetable was changed. Overall, the rebuilding cost €6 million, of which Deutsche Bahn provided €3.2 million, the state €1.3 million and the municipality of Jünkerath €514,000.

== Jünkerath Railway Museum ==
Near the station is the Jünkerath Railway Museum (Eisenbahnmuseum Jünkerath). The museum was built in 1991 in a building that was no longer used. The railway museum mainly displays exhibits such as tickets and railway paraphernalia and the trains themselves.
