= Gerolstein station =

Railway station in Gerolstein, Germany

Gerolstein
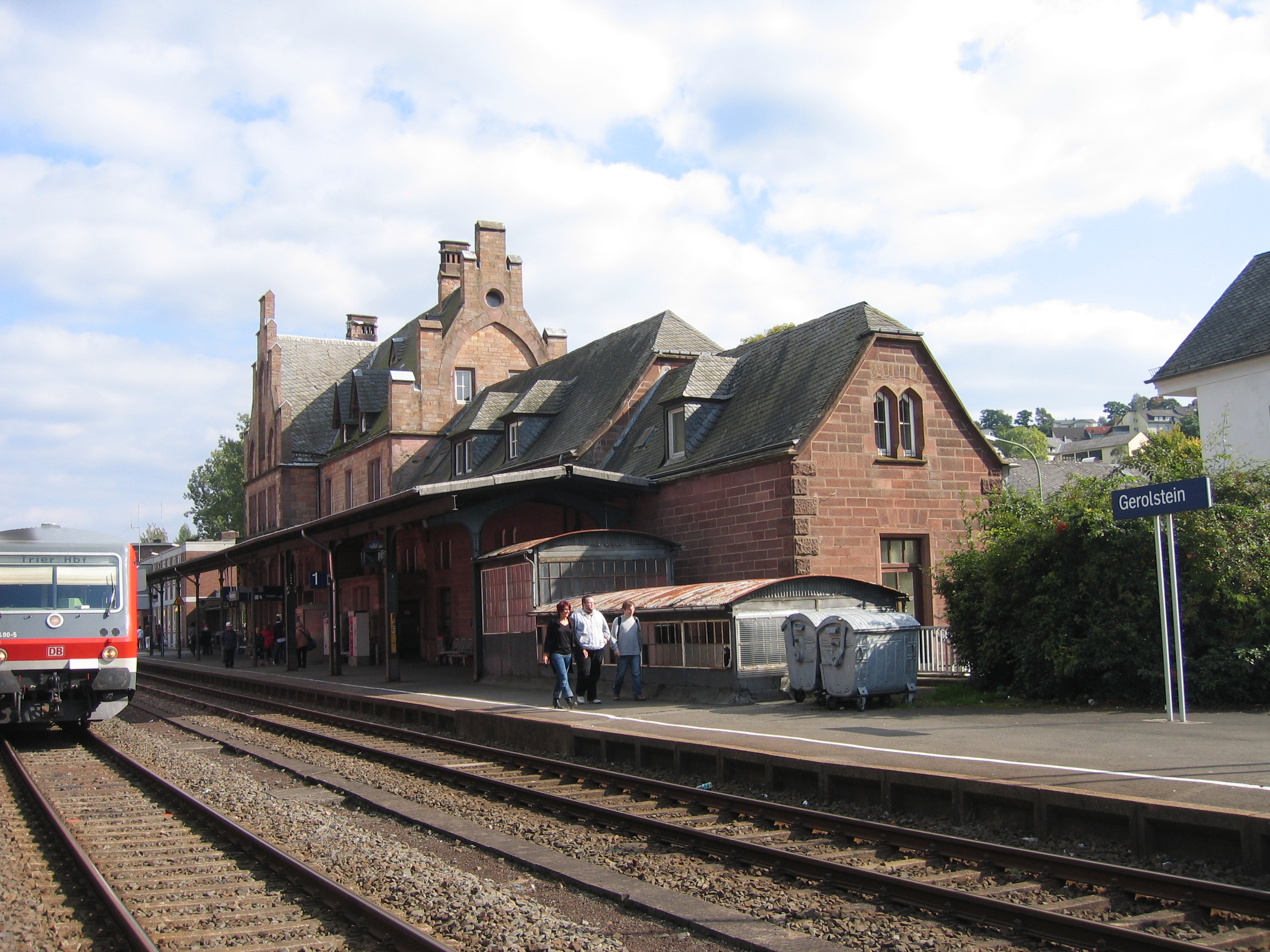
- Gerolstein station, 2008

General information
- Location: Bahnhofstr. 4, Gerolstein, Rhineland-Palatinate; Germany
- Coordinates: 50°13′26″N 6°39′38″E
- Lines: Hürth-Kalscheuren–Ehrang (KBS 474; km 101.0); Gerolstein–St. Vith (closed; km 0.0); Andernach–Gerolstein (no services; km 94.1); Hillesheim–Gerolstein (closed)
- Platforms: 5

Construction
- Accessible: Platforms 1, 2 and 3 only
- Architectural style: Gothic Revival

Other information
- Station code: 2099
- DS100 code: SGR
- IBNR: 8000123
- Category: 4
- Fare zone: VRT: 516; VRS: 2996 (VRT transitional tariff)
- Website: www.bahnhof.de

History
- Opened: November 1870
Location

Gerolstein station is a station on the Eifel Railway in Gerolstein in the German state of Rhineland-Palatinate. Its former function as an important junction station, however, has been lost with the closure of the Cross Eifel Railway (Eifelquerbahn) and the West Eifel Railway (Westeifelbahn). It is the only remaining station in the town.

== History ==
Due to the difficult topography and the low population density of the Eifel, railways reached it quite late. At that time it was easier to run railway lines exclusively through river valleys, where bridges and tunnels were rarely necessary. In addition, hardly any profits were expected from railway lines in the Eifel.

Planning only began when metalworking became common in the Eifel, which was fairly late. Early Prussian considerations concerned a route from Cologne and Düren to Schleiden, which, however, was rejected for financial reasons. However, when it was proposed that the line would later be extended to Trier, the Rhenish Railway Company (Rheinische Eisenbahn-Gesellschaft) became interested and it agreed to begin construction of the line in November 1867. The line reached Gerolstein about three years later. Due to the outbreak of the Franco-Prussian War, the railway company was required to complete the line to Trier rapidly, so that the connection to Trier was finished as early as 15 June 1871. At the time the Eifel Railway showed its strategic-military importance for the first time.

With the opening of the West Eifel Railway to Prüm in 1883, Gerolstein station became a junction station. This was followed in 1885 with the extension into the then German town of St. Vith. As a result of the construction of the Pronsfeld–Waxweiler railway from this route, Gerolstein developed into an important junction station in the Eifel. An extra connection was added to the station with the connection of the Cross Eifel Railway on 15 May 1895. Now there was not only connections towards Cologne and Trier, but also a connection towards Koblenz.

Rail traffic between Trier and Cologne was interrupted by the war from the winter of 1944 and was only recorded restarting in 1946, so there were no direct connections from Gerolstein in these directions. Parts of the two-track line were converted into single-track sections. The war had also affected the two branch lines, but these were reopened at the end of the 1940s.

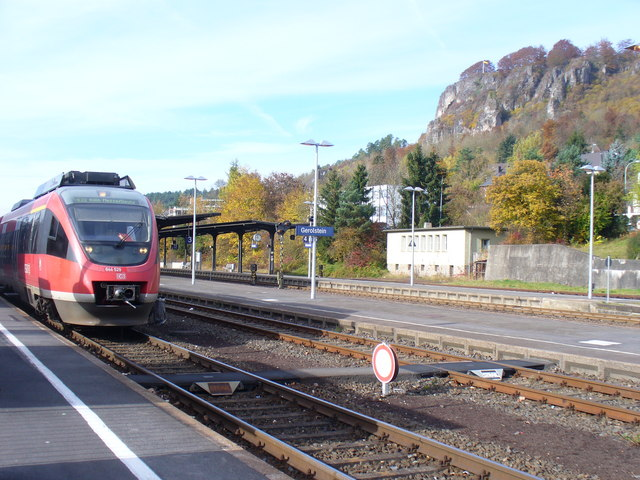
Platforms, 2009

Traffic on the Cross Eifel Railway declined sharply in the 1960s, meaning that closure was considered for the first time. But this process lasted for almost 30 years and the last train ran from Gerolstein to Mayen on 13 January 1991. The section from Mayen to the Rhine is still used for regular traffic today. On 9 June 2009, the Zweckverband SPNV-Nord (municipal association for rail transport in northern Rhineland-Palatinate) approved the complete reactivation of the Cross Eifel Railway for daily operations, but due to a decision of the municipality of Daun in December 2012 to oppose the revival of the line, this was not implemented as planned for the 2014 timetable change. By 2012, the Gerolstein–Mayen section was regular served by historical trains, but these were not resumed after the decision against reviving the line.

At the same time, the West Eifel Railway had a similar experience. Services were cut back to Prüm in the 1980s and by the end of the 1990s, Gondelsheim had become the terminus. On 1 June 1996, the last train ran from Gerolstein to Gondelsheim.

In recent times, the reactivation of the West Eifel Railway to Prüm has been discussed; this would make Gerolstein station a junction station again. However, implementation would be a difficult, as after the closure of the line, it was sold to the affected transport association and converted into a cycle path. The cycle path had only been built for a short distance from Prüm. But the Rhine-Sieg-Eisenbahn (RSE) then became involved, which had successfully reactivated the Olef Valley Railway (Oleftalbahn). Therefore, the line was then cleared and prepared for operations. However, its application for an operating license in 2011 was rejected because the Rhineland-Palatinate Ministry of Transport did not consider that the RSE had the financial resources to implement the scheme. The request was only accepted as a result of an independent opinion and a revised plan was submitted to the Oberlandesgericht Koblenz (one of two regional superior courts of "ordinary" jurisdiction in Rhineland-Palatinate). However, the line has not yet been fully cleared and made operational. Since then, the Westeifelbahn interest group has been attempting to reactivate the railway line without delay.

== Station building and environment ==
The station building is built in the Gothic Revival style. The building largely survived the turmoil of the Second World War and was extended in the post-war period. Many station buildings along the Eifel Railway are built in the same style. These splendid "palaces" (Schlösser) were financed from the money that France had to pay as reparations to Germany after the Franco-Prussian War.

The entrance building has been owned by the Gerolsteiner Land since 2013 and was extensively repaired and modernised between 2013 and 2016. Located in the building are the office of TW Gerolsteiner Land, the Deutsche Bahn travel centre, a bakery and a driving school. On the first floor are also the offices of Gerolsteiner Land.

As part of these modernisation measures, the new travel centre, including a ticket office, and the Gerolsteiner Land tourist office were opened on 7 May 2015. The construction of the new travel centre cost a total of €35,000. For this the old travel centre was completely gutted and then fitted out for the new premises. In particular, customer space was expanded.

The basalt works of the Rheinische Provinzial-Basaltwerke lies between Gerolstein and Birresborn. A class 323 (Köf II) locomotive is stationed at the works for the shunting of freight trains that arrive irregularly.

The important Bahnbetriebswerk (locomotive depot) Gerolstein was once based in Gerolstein station. Only a roundhouse and turntable still exist. Today, the works are used as a railway museum and depot for the heritage railway on the Cross Eifel Railway.

The station has five railway platforms to this day as a relic from its period as a junction station.

== Services ==
The following services stop in Gerolstein station:

2017 timetable
Line	Route	Frequency
RE 12	Eifel-Mosel-Express: Köln Messe/Deutz – Cologne Hbf – Köln Süd – Euskirchen – Mechernich – Kall – Jünkerath – Gerolstein – Bitburg-Erdorf – Trier Hbf	Three train pairs
RE 22	Eifel-Express: Köln Messe/Deutz – Köln Hbf – Köln West – Köln Süd – Erftstadt – Weilerswist – Euskirchen – Mechernich – Kall – Urft (Steinfeld) – Nettersheim – Blankenheim (Wald) – Schmidtheim – Dahlem (Eifel) – Jünkerath – Lissendorf – Oberbettingen-Hillesheim – Gerolstein	60 min
RB 22	Eifel-Express: Gerolstein – Birresborn – Densborn – Kyllburg – Bitburg-Erdorf – Speicher – Kordel – Ehrang – Pfalzel – Trier Hbf (running on the Köln–Gerolstein section as the RE 22)	60 min
RB 24	Eifel-Bahn: Köln Messe/Deutz – Köln Hbf – Köln West – Köln Süd – Hürth Kalscheuren – Brühl Kierberg – Erftstadt – Weilerswist – Euskirchen – Euskirchen Satzway - Mechernich – Kall – Urft – Nettersheim – Blankenheim (Wald) – Schmidtheim – Dahlem (Eifel) – Jünkerath – Lissendorf – Oberbettingen-Hillesheim – Gerolstein	Some additional services in the peak hour

The RE 22 from Cologne changes designation In Gerolstein and continues towards Trier as the RB 22 and vice versa.
