= Kierberg station =

Railway station in Brühl, Germany

Kierberg
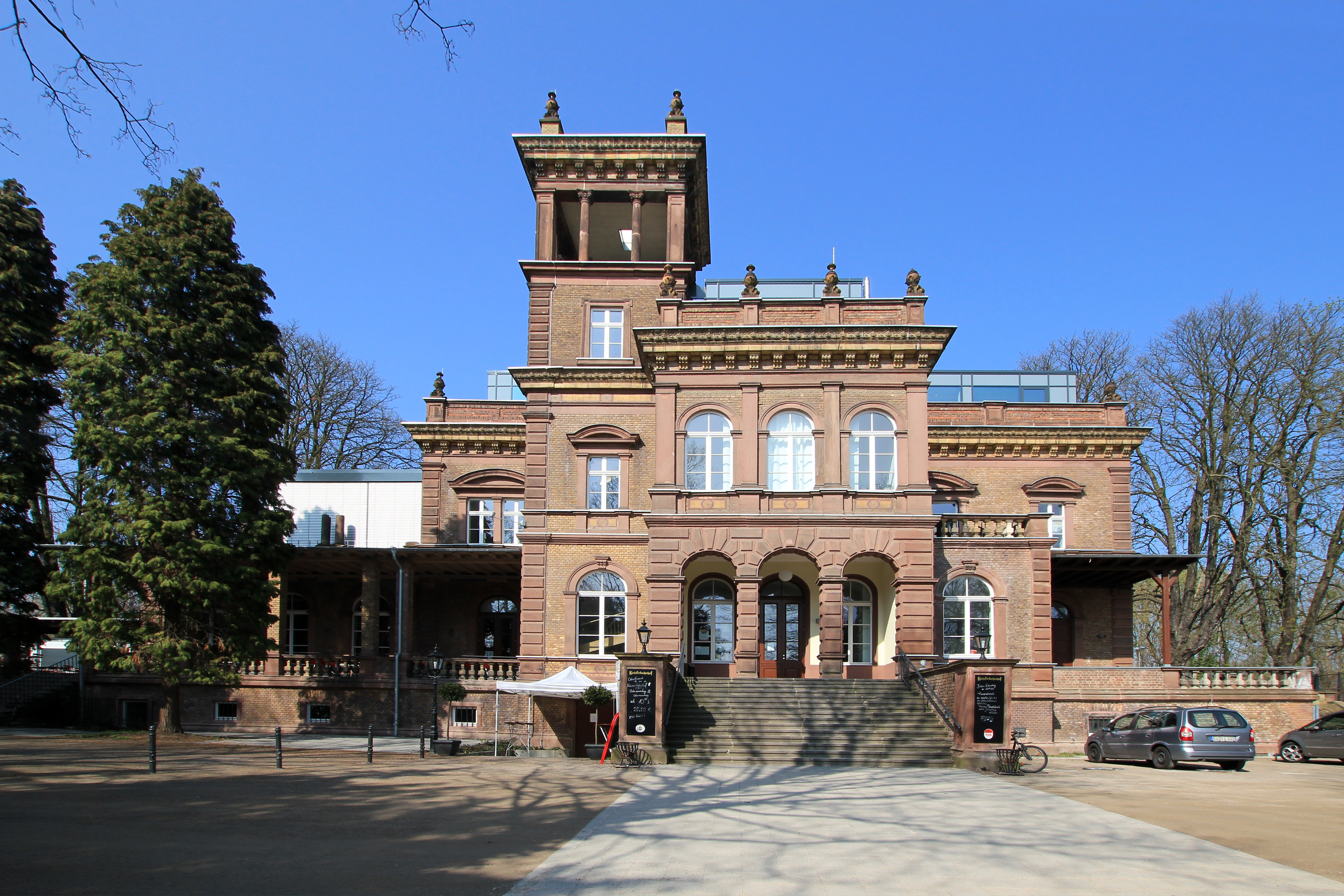
- Listed station building

General information
- Location: Kierbergerstr. 158a, Kierberg, Brühl, NRW; Germany
- Coordinates: 50°50′16″N 6°53′17″E
- Line: Cologne–Trier
- Platforms: 2

Construction
- Accessible: Yes

Other information
- Station code: 3175
- DS100 code: KKIE
- IBNR: 8003252
- Category: 5
- Fare zone: VRS: 2840
- Website: www.bahnhof.de

History
- Opened: October 1875

Services
Preceding station	DB Regio NRW	Following station
Erftstadt towards Gerolstein	RB 24	Hürth-Kalscheuren towards Köln Messe/Deutz
Location

Kierberg station is on the Eifel Railway, connecting Cologne, Euskirchen, Gerolstein and Trier in Kierberg, a suburb of Brühl in the German state of North Rhine-Westphalia. It is served by Regionalbahn service RB 24 from Cologne via Euskirchen to Kall. The former station building for the German Emperor called the Kaiserbahnhof (imperial station) now serves as the Kaiserbahnhof restaurant.

== Services ==
DB Regio NRW operates Regionalbahn service RB 24 (Eifelbahn) on the Eifel Railway at hourly intervals using class 644 (Bombardier Talent) diesel multiple units in sets of one to three vehicles at speeds of up to 120 km/h. Tariffs for services are set by the Verkehrsverbund Rhein-Sieg (Rhine-Sieg Transport Association).

Line	Service	Route	Frequency
RB 24	Eifelbahn	Cologne – Kierberg – Erftstadt – Euskirchen – Kall	Every hour

The modern station facilities were last renovated from December 2006 until 13 March 2008. This established a central platform, which is accessible via a new pedestrian underpass with stairs and two lifts. In addition, ticket machines were installed.

== History ==
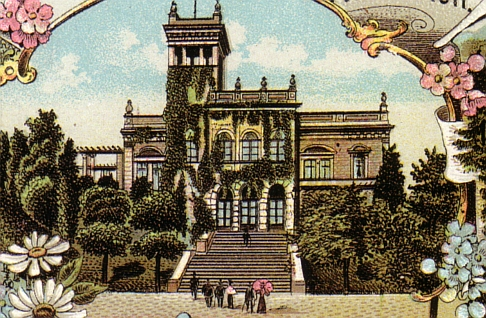
The Kaiserbahnhof on a 19th-century postcard

The so-called Kaiserbahnhof in Brühl-Kierberg is considered one of the most beautiful railway station building in Germany. It was built in a small park at the end of 1877 on Kaiserstraße, which connects to the inner town of Brühl. Emperor William II was responsible for its particularly elaborate design, because the station served as a stopover on his annual visits to the autumn military manoeuvres in the Eifel. An additional siding was created on the north side of the line for the imperial train. As a result, the Kaiserbahnhof was considered to be a real railway station under the definitions used by the Prussian state railways. The Emperor rode in a carriage on the road from the station to the imperial palace at Brühl, where he stayed. The park surrounding the station is decorated with numerous sculptures on classical themes. The statue of the Rape of Proserpine was allegedly created for one of the Paris world exhibitions.

== Current situation ==
Since the 1980s, the station building has housed a restaurant with a beer garden. Beginning in December 2008, the building was gutted, restored and partially rebuilt.
