= Hürth-Kalscheuren station =

Railway station in Hürth, Germany

Hürth-Kalscheuren
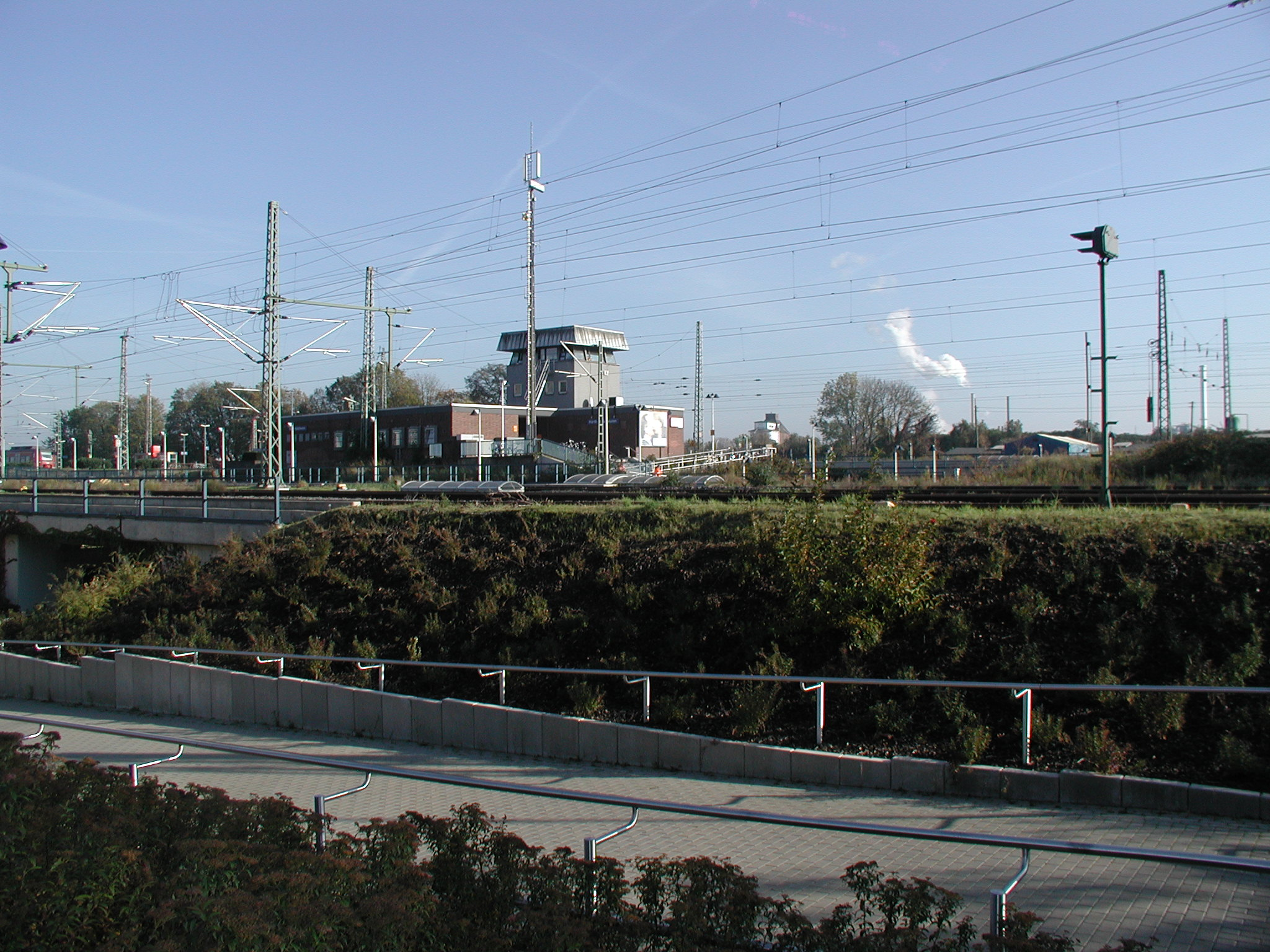
- 2006

General information
- Location: Rodenkirchener Str. 1, Hürth, NRW; Germany
- Coordinates: 50°52′33″N 6°54′36″E
- Owner: DB Netz
- Operator: DB Station&Service
- Lines: West Rhine Railway (KBS 470, km 9.4); Eifel Railway (KBS 474, km 0.6)
- Platforms: 5

Construction
- Accessible: Yes, except platform 1

Other information
- Station code: 3089
- DS100 code: KKAS
- IBNR: 8003160
- Category: 4
- Fare zone: VRS: 2830
- Website: www.bahnhof.de

History
- Opened: 1859

Services
Preceding station	DB Regio NRW	Following station
Kierberg towards Gerolstein	RB 24	Köln Süd towards Köln Messe/Deutz
Preceding station	Trans Regio	Following station
Brühl towards Mainz Hbf	RB 26	Köln Süd towards Köln Messe/Deutz
Preceding station	National Express Germany	Following station
Brühl towards Bonn-Mehlem	RB 48 (Rhein-Wupper-Bahn)	Köln Süd towards Wuppertal-Oberbarmen
Location
- Location within North Rhine-Westphalia

Hürth-Kalscheuren station is in the town of Hürth in the Rhein-Erft district in the German state of North Rhine-Westphalia. It is at the junction of the Eifel Railway with the West Rhine Railway. The station was built in 1859 at the initiative of the city of Hürth, but was renamed Hürth-Kalscheuren in 1991/2 as a result of a contribution of Deutsche Mark 14,000 from Kalscheuren.

== Location ==
Hürth-Kalscheuren station is located on the eastern edge of the city of Hürth in the district of Kalscheuren near the local television studios on the border of the city of Cologne.

North to the station’s track field is the southern exit from the container terminal of Cologne Eifeltor freight yard.

Hürth-Kalscheuren station is served by bus line 714 of Hürth public transport, connecting to the centre of Hürth and the Vorgebirgsbahn (literally "foothills railway", now line 18 of the Cologne Stadtbahn) station Hürth-Hermülheim. Meschenich, which belongs to the Rodenkirchen district of Cologne, is connected by bus line 192 Monday through Friday mornings and afternoons/evenings.

== Structure ==
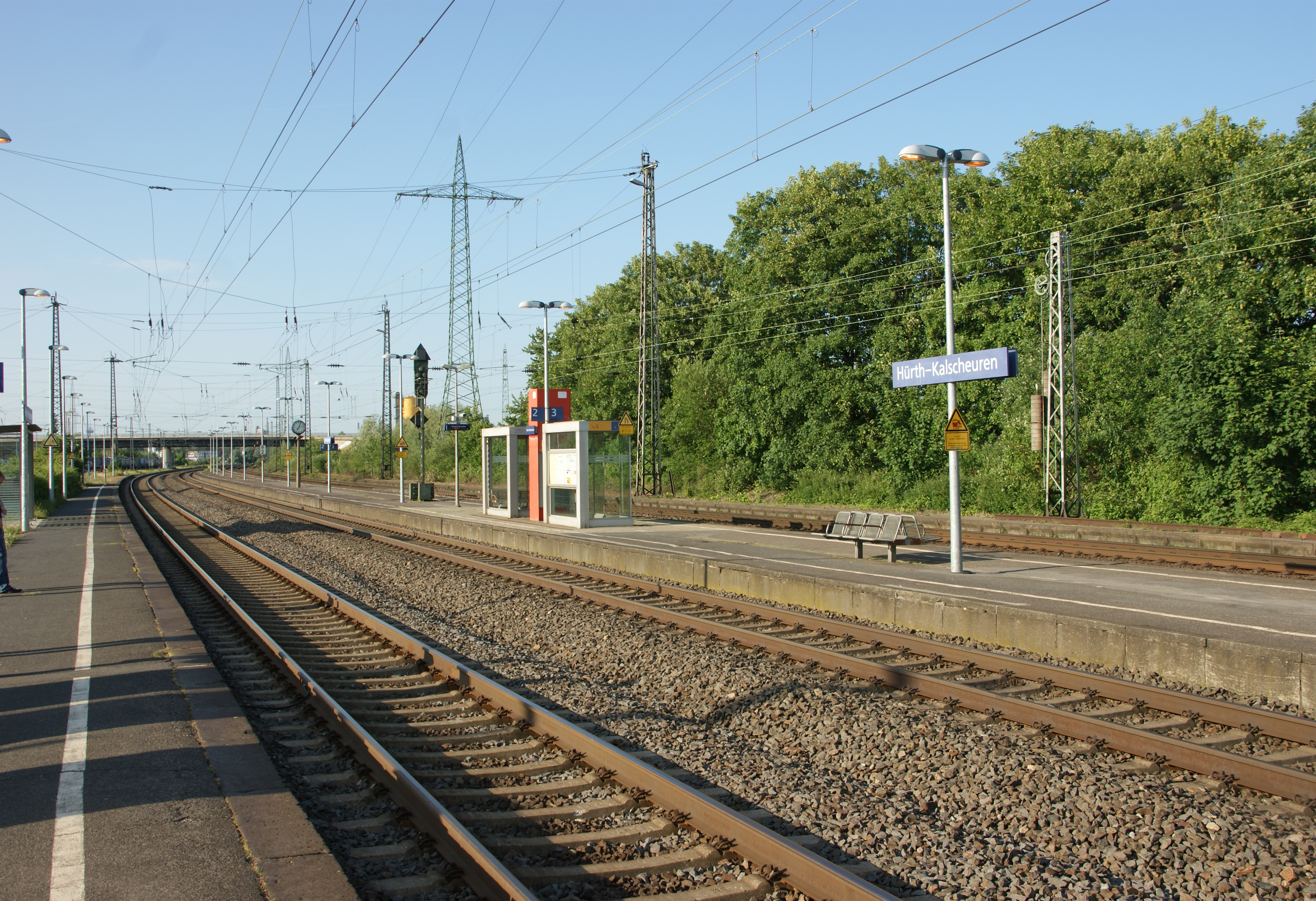
Platform on the Left Rhine line, looking towards Cologne

Hürth-Kalscheuren station is a junction station built on an island between the tracks. The station building is located between platform track 1 and track 51 and there are crossovers between the two tracks to the north and south of the station. In addition to the main platform, there are two island platforms, which lie between tracks 53 and 51 and between tracks 2 and 3.

Tracks 1 and 2 are located on the West Rhine Railway, which runs between Cologne, Bonn and Koblenz. Tracks 3 and 4 (which has no platform) are used to haul freight to Cologne-Ehrenfeld and Cologne-Nippes freight yard. Tracks 51 and 53 and some other tracks without platforms connect to the Eifel Railway, which branches off from the West Rhine Railway in Kalscheuren towards Kall and Gerolstein.

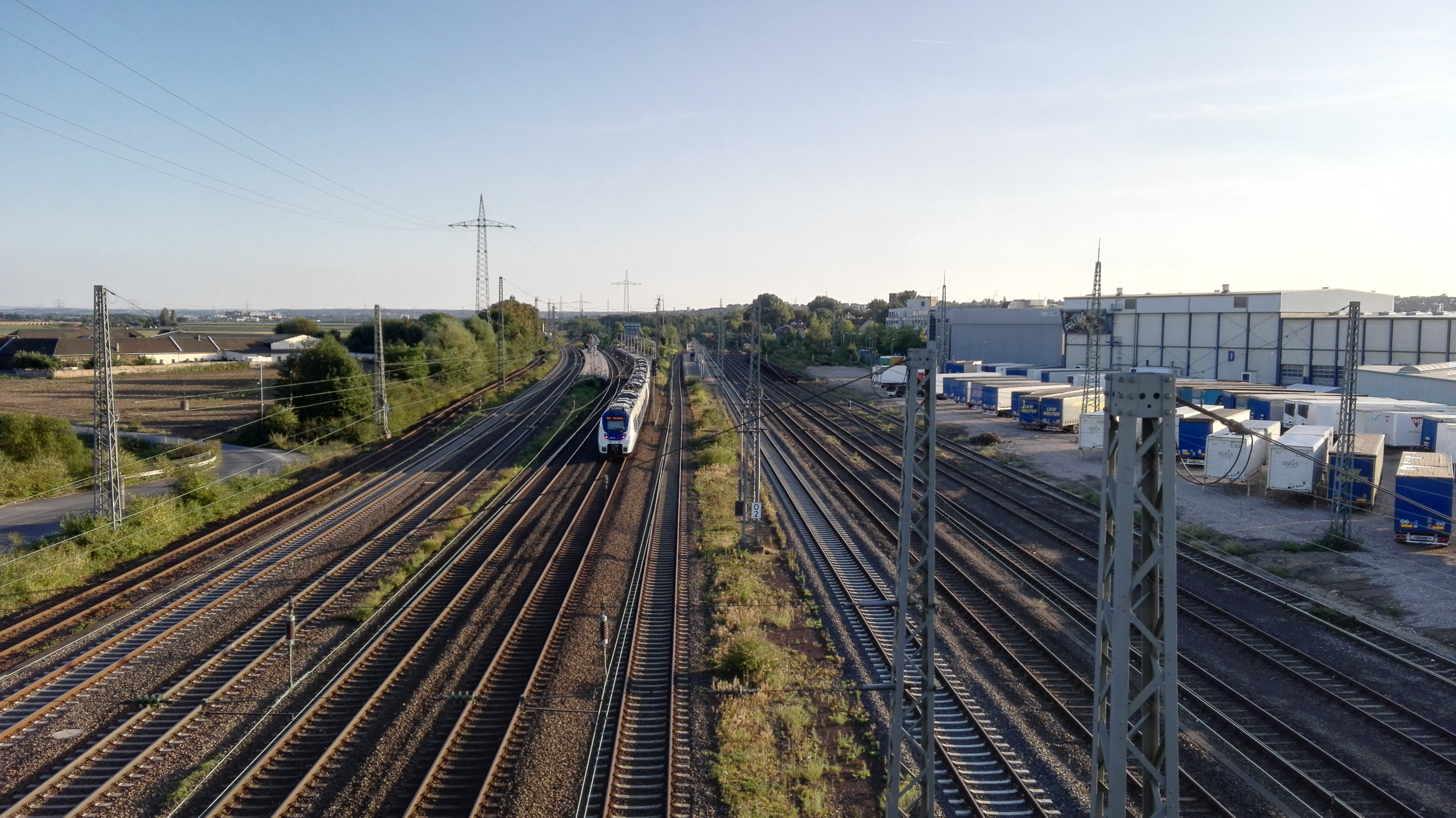
Hürth-Kalscheuren station, looking towards Bonn

== Services ==
The station is served by Regionalbahn service RB 24, operated by DB Regio NRW on the Eifel Railway, and MRB 26, operated by TransRegio Deutsche Regionalbahn GmbH on the East Rhine line, both running once an hour each way every day. Long-distance and Regional-Express trains pass through Hürth-Kalscheuren station without stopping. The hourly services on line RB 48 (Rhein-Wupper-Bahn) between Wuppertal-Oberbarmen and Bonn-Mehlem, operated by National Express Germany, also passed through the station without stopping until December 2015, but stop since then.

Line	Line name	Route
RB 24	Eifel-Bahn	Köln Messe/Deutz – Cologne Hbf – Hürth-Kalscheuren – Euskirchen – Kall
RB 26	MittelrheinBahn	Köln Messe/Deutz – Cologne Hbf – Hürth-Kalscheuren – Bonn – Koblenz – Mainz
RB 48	Rhein-Wupper-Bahn	Wuppertal-Oberbarmen – Wuppertal – Cologne Hbf – Hürth-Kalscheuren – Bonn – Bonn-Mehlem
