= Cologne freight bypass railway =

Railway in North Rhine-Westphalia, Germany

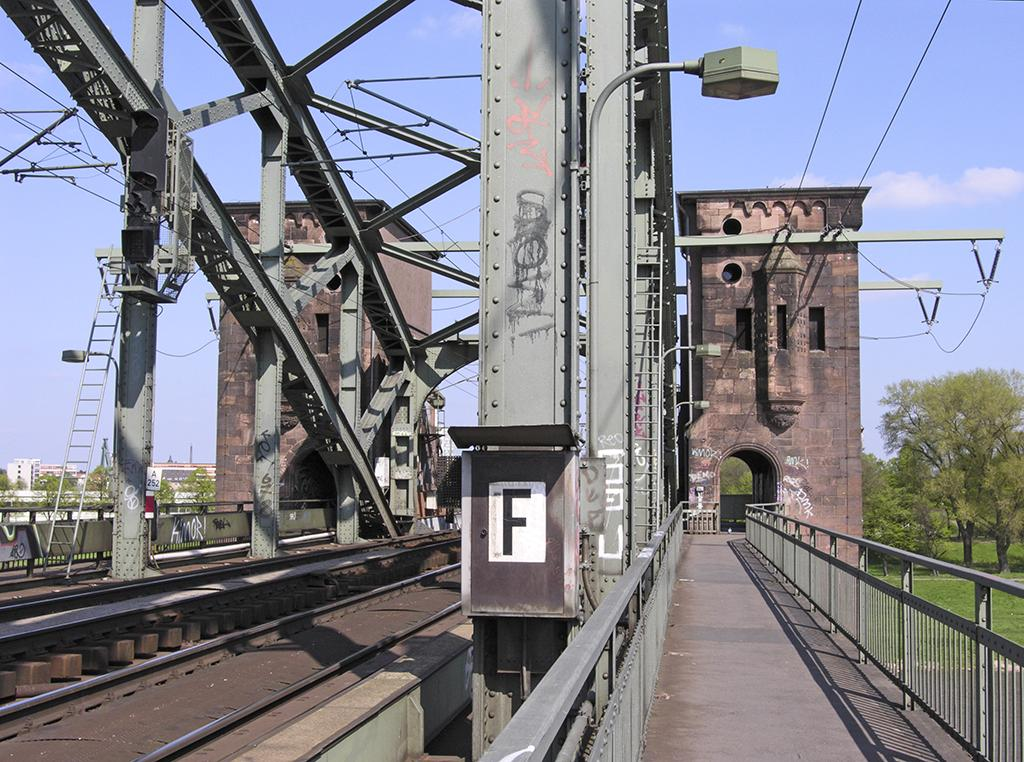
- Towers at the eastern end of the South Bridge

Overview
- Native name: Güterumgehungsbahn Köln
- Line number: 2641 (Köln Süd–Köln-Kalk Nord); 2642 (Cologne South–Cologne Bonntor); 2656 (Cologne South bridge–Gremberg Nord)
- Locale: North Rhine-Westphalia, Germany

Technical
- Line length: 7.7 km (4.8 mi) + 7.1 km (4.4 mi)
- Number of tracks: 2
- Track gauge: 1,435 mm (4 ft 8 1/2 in) standard gauge
- Electrification: 15 kV/16.7 Hz AC Overhead catenary
- Operating speed: 60 km/h (37 mph)

The Cologne freight bypass railway (German: Güterumgehungsbahn Köln) is a main line railway in southern Cologne in the German state of North Rhine-Westphalia. It is fully duplicated and electrified.

The railway crosses the Cologne South Bridge, connecting the West Rhine Railway (Linke Rheinstrecke), Cologne South station and the Cologne Eifeltor freight yard on the left (western) side of the Rhine with the Sieg Railway, the Cologne-Frankfurt high-speed railway, the East Rhine Railway (Rechte Rheinstrecke), and the marshalling yards of Cologne-Kalk Nord and Gremberg on the right (eastern) side of the Rhine. It was opened on 5 April 1910, disrupted by the bombing of the South Bridge on 6 January 1945, reopened with one track on 3 May 1946 and two tracks in 1950 and electrified on 27 May 1962.

== Operations ==
The line is mainly used by freight trains in order not to have to run through Cologne Hauptbahnhof (main or central station).

Along the line, there are no passenger stations. During the development of the Western Ring (Westring) project as part of the Rhine-Sieg S-Bahn (operated as part of the Rhine-Ruhr S-Bahn), consideration is being given to running over the South Bridge.

Until the upgrade of the Köln Messe/Deutz station, the bypass line was used by Intercity-Express (ICE) trains from Düsseldorf and Wuppertal running towards the Cologne-Frankfurt high-speed railway avoiding, on the one hand, a change of direction in Cologne station and, on the other hand, twice using the chronically overloaded Hohenzollern Bridge, which can only be run over at 30 km/h.

Currently, except for occasional ICE and EuroNight services, the rail bypass is only used by passenger trains on an unscheduled basis, for example during disruption or construction on the direct line.
