= Hürth-Kalscheuren–Ehrang railway =

Railway in Germany

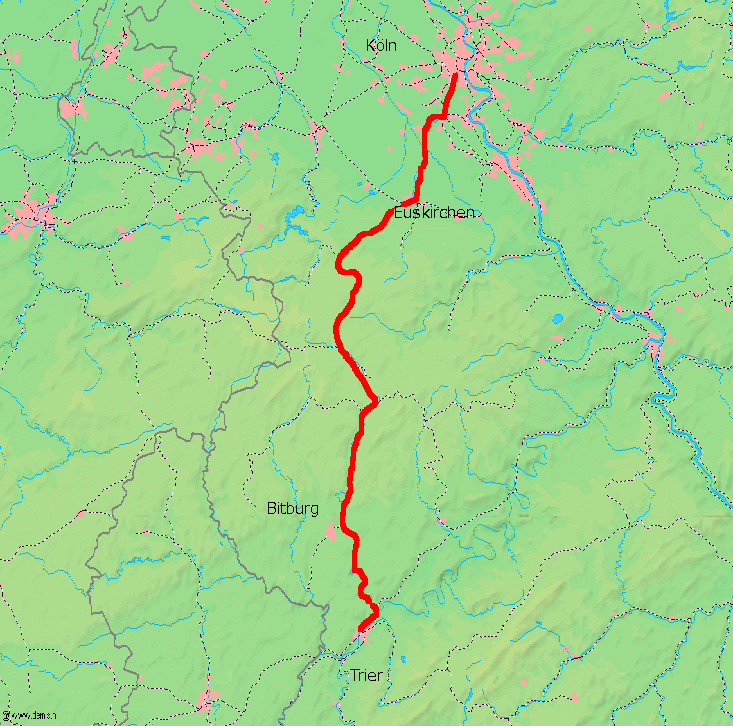

Overview
- Other name: Eifel Railway
- Native name: Eifelstrecke
- Line number: 2631
- Locale: Rhineland-Palatinate, Germany
- Termini: Hürth-Kalscheuren; Ehrang

Service
- Route number: 474

Technical
- Line length: 163.5 km (101.6 mi)
- Number of tracks: 2: Hürth-Kalscheuren – Kall; 2: Nettersheim – Blankenheim (Wald); 2: Schmidtheim – Lissendorf; 2: Bewingen – Gerolstein; 2: Birresborn – Densborn; 2: Kordel – Trier
- Track gauge: 1,435 mm (4 ft 8 1/2 in) standard gauge

The Hürth-Kalscheuren–Ehrang railway (also known in German as the Eifelstrecke—Eifel Railway) is a non-electrified line in the German states of North Rhine-Westphalia and Rhineland-Palatinate running from Hürth-Kalscheuren via Euskirchen and Gerolstein to Trier-Ehrang through the Eifel hills.

The line is predominantly duplicated north of Densborn. Today it is only served by trains running as far as Köln Messe/Deutz station or Trier Hauptbahnhof.

== History ==
In 1864, the Rhenish Railway Company began construction of the Eifel line from Düren via Euskirchen and Gerolstein to Trier. The section from Düren to Euskirchen is now known as the Börde Railway (Bördebahn).

Opening date	Section
27 June 1865	Euskirchen–Mechernich
1 November 1867	Mechernich–Kall
19 June 1868	Kall–Sötenich
15 November 1870	Sötenich–Gerolstein
15 June 1871	Gerolstein–Trier West

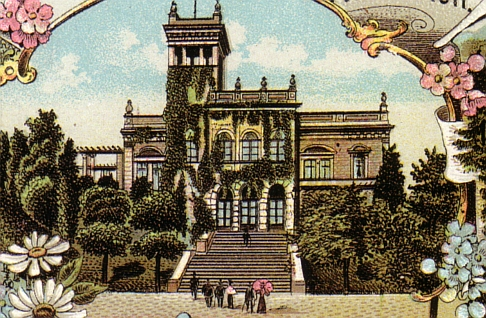
Kierberg station, known as Kaiserbahnhof (Emperor Station)

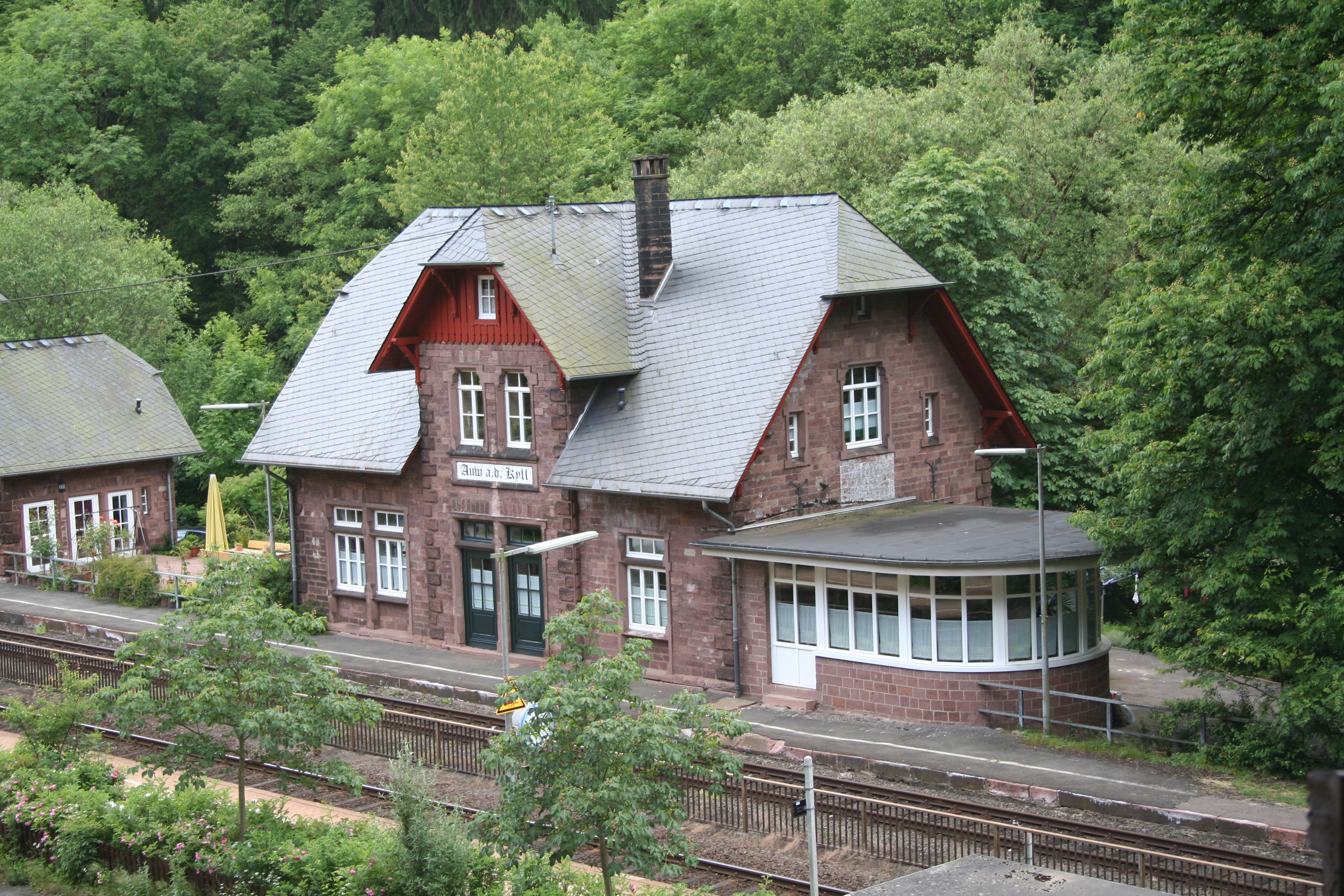
Auw an der Kyll station

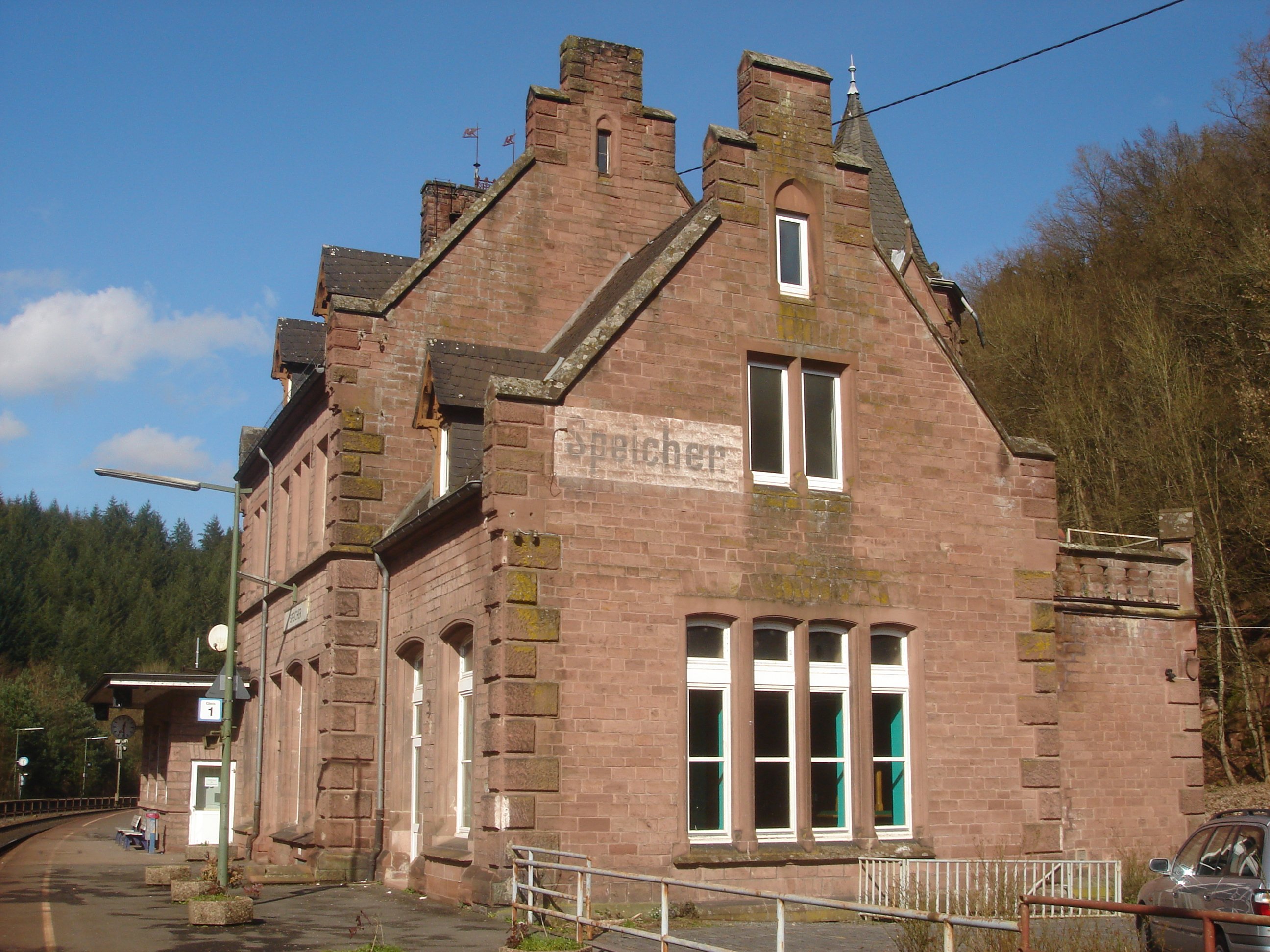
Speicher station

On 1 October 1875, it was connected from Euskirchen with the Left Rhine line at Kalscheuren. Numerous bridges and tunnels on the line as well as the stations at Euskirchen, Weilerswist and Kierberg were built by Hermann Schmalenbach.

=== The route ===
Before World War I the Prussian railway administration planned that the Eifel line would be one of the first lines in Germany to be electrified. But this failed because of the opposition from the military on the ground that the line was too close to the French border. Also, a connection of the Eifel line with the Bonn–Koblenz line near Sechtem was planned, which was also never implemented (this was part of the Strategischer Bahndamm—"Strategic railway embankment"—a plan to build a western bypass of the rail nodes at Cologne and Düsseldorf to accelerate military mobilisation, although only the Ludendorff Bridge at Remagen was ever completed).

By the end of World War II, the entire line was duplicated. After the war, the second track in the south was largely dismantled on the orders of the French occupation forces and the track material was taken to France. In the northern section (which was in the British zone), the second track remained in place over almost its entire length, while the southern section continues to be mainly single track. Today the reconstruction of the second track in many places is difficult since its location has been put to other uses, often as a bicycle path parallel to the railway.

=== Freight ===
The Eifel track is still not electrified. This means that freight trains run from the Ruhr to the Saar and on to Lorraine via Koblenz. On 28 December 2001 the last freight train of DB Cargo (now DB Schenker Rail) ran on this route.

=== Passengers ===
Long-distance express trains used to run from Saarbrücken and Trier to Cologne via the Moselle line via Koblenz or via the Eifel line, often continuing to Münster. After the electrification of the Mosel line in 1974, most long-distance trains ran on the Moselle line. Now all long-distance services run on the Moselle line.

Regional services running at hourly intervals were introduced on the Eifel line in 1991 with additional trains north of Gerolstein or Jünkerath. Approximately every two hours express trains or Regional-Express (RE) trains also ran between Cologne and Trier. In 1996 the line was upgraded for tilting trains so that RE services operated by class 611 diesel multiple units could run over the Eifel line from Saarbrücken to Cologne. This project failed due to technical problems with the vehicles, so the RE trains from Saarbrücken continue to operate to Koblenz with a connection in Trier to diesel trains over the Eifel line to Cologne.

=== Vehicles ===
Until the 1970s haulage of express trains was dominated by steam locomotives of class 39 and 01, while freight traffic was operated by all classes of Prussian freight locomotives used in the Deutsche Reichsbahn era, especially the heavy class 44s. They were gradually replaced by steam locomotives of class 50 and 86. Passenger locomotives of class 23 were added from the 1950s.

With the onset of dieselisation of the line locomotives of class 211 and 216 were usual and from the 1970s until 2001 class 215 locomotives operated on the line. Between 2001 and 2009 some class 218 diesel locomotives ran on the line. In addition, from 1964 to 1980 class 624 diesel multiple unit operated over the line.

Up in the 1950s, trains with Prussian compartment coaches ran on regional services. These were replaced by Silberling carriages hauled by class 215 diesel locomotives, which were later superseded by class 218 locomotives running on the Eifel line along with class 644 diesel multiple units until 2009. Some trains were at this time operated with class 612 and 628 railcars. No trains hauled by class 218s ran after the timetable change in December 2009. Instead, they were operated by class 628 multiple units. Class 54 and 81 LINT railcars have been used since December 2013.

== Current services ==
The Eifel line is served daily by following Regional-Express and Regionalbahn services:

- RE 12: Eifel-Mosel-Express, running three times a day on the Cologne–Euskirchen–Gerolstein–Trier route
- RE 22: Eifel-Express, running hourly from Cologne to Gerolstein via Euskirchen and continuing as the RB 22 to Trier
- RB 24 Eifelbahn, running as additional services in the peak only on the (Jünkerath–)Gerolstein–Trier route

These services are operated by DB Regio NRW, using Alstom Coradia LINT 54 or 81 diesel multiple units the timetable change in December 2013.

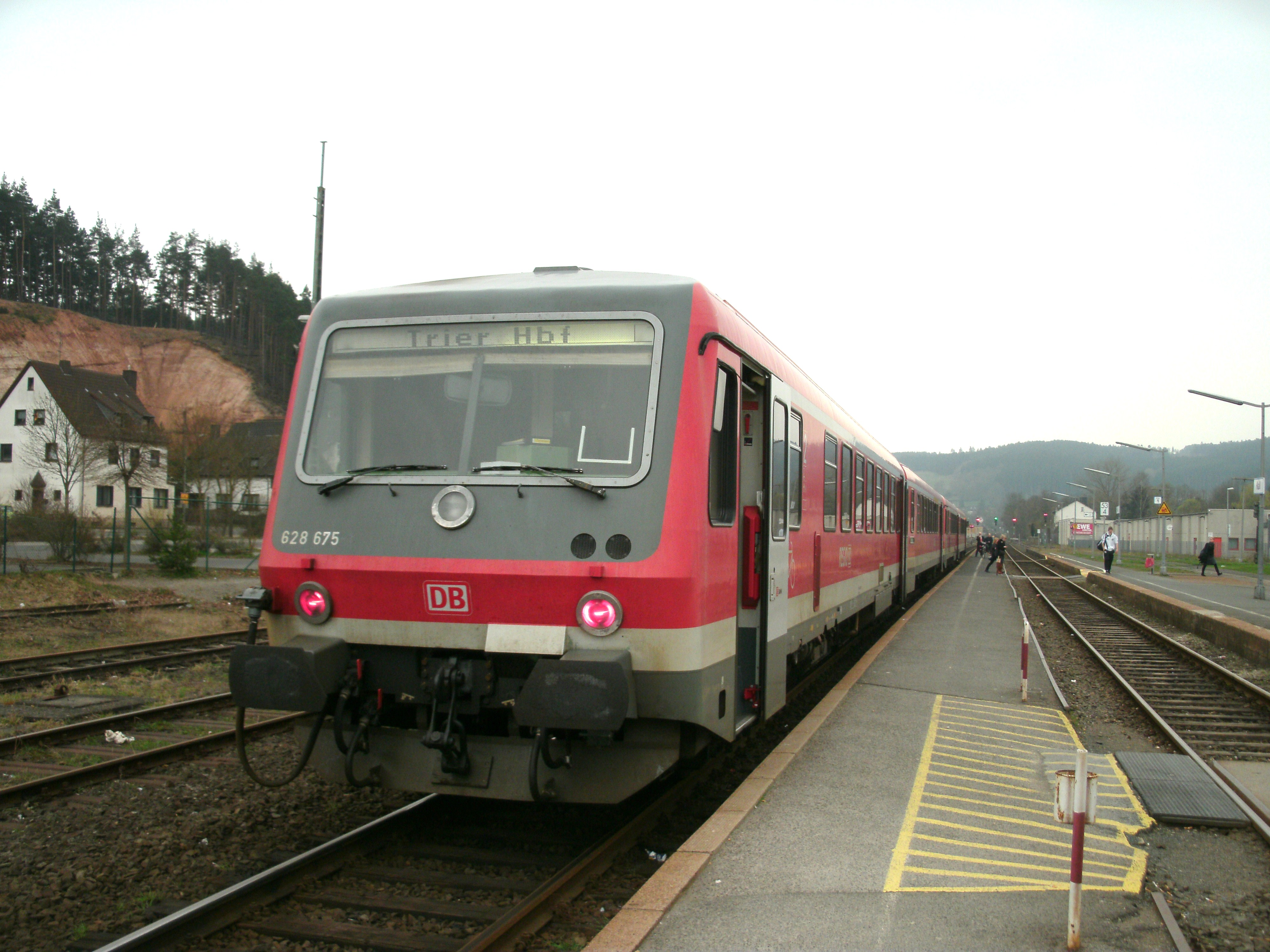
Class 628 operating as Eifel-Express (RE12) in Kall (2011)

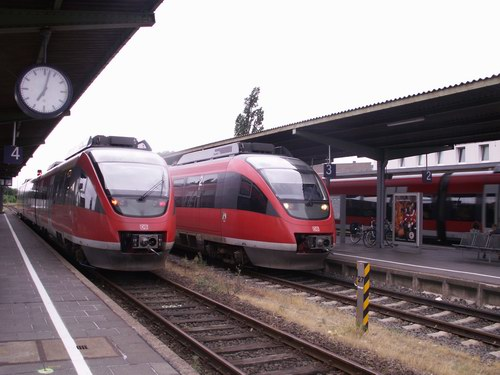
Class 644 in Euskirchen (2006)

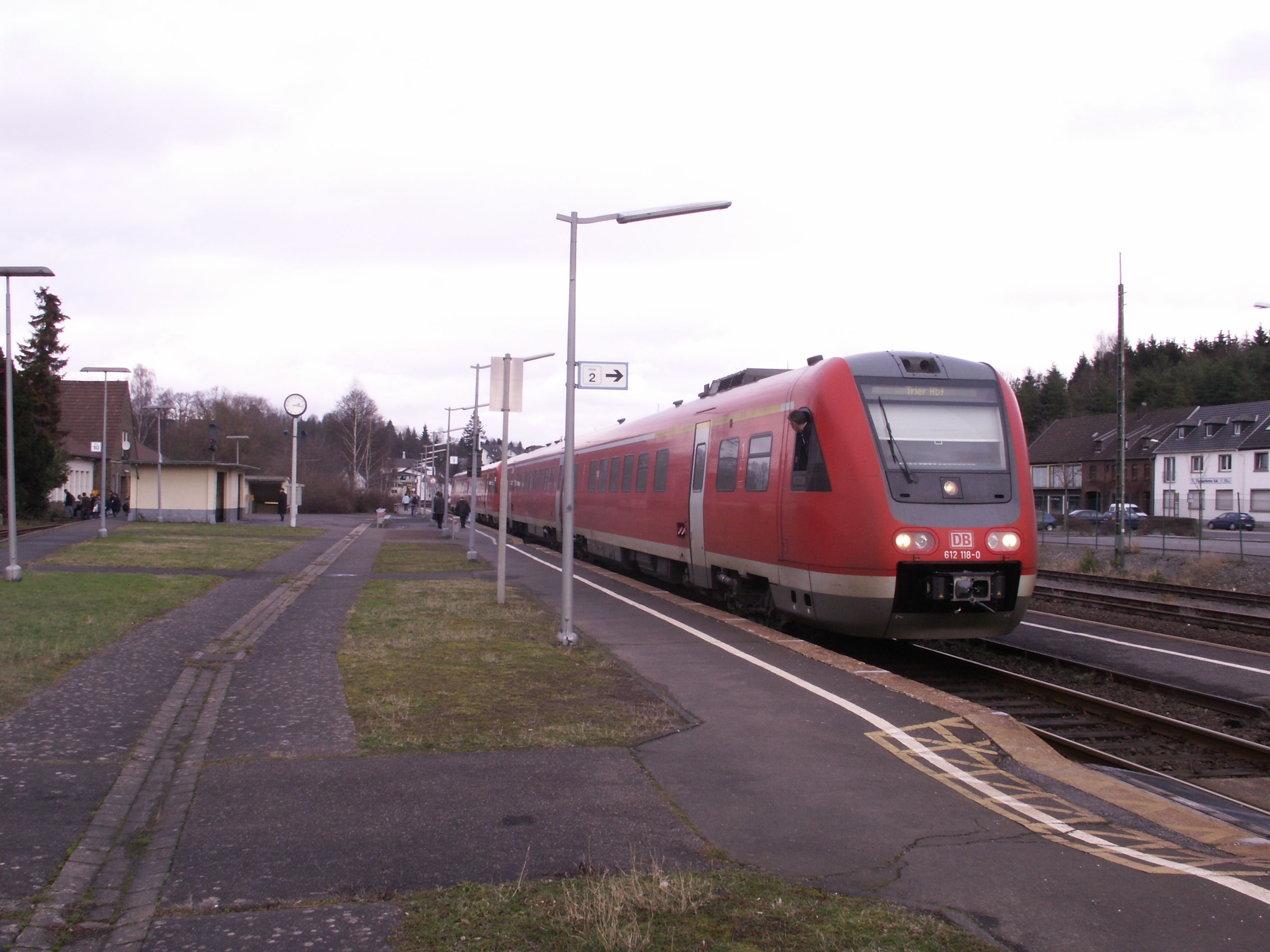
Class 612 operating as Eifel-Mosel-Express in Kall (2007)

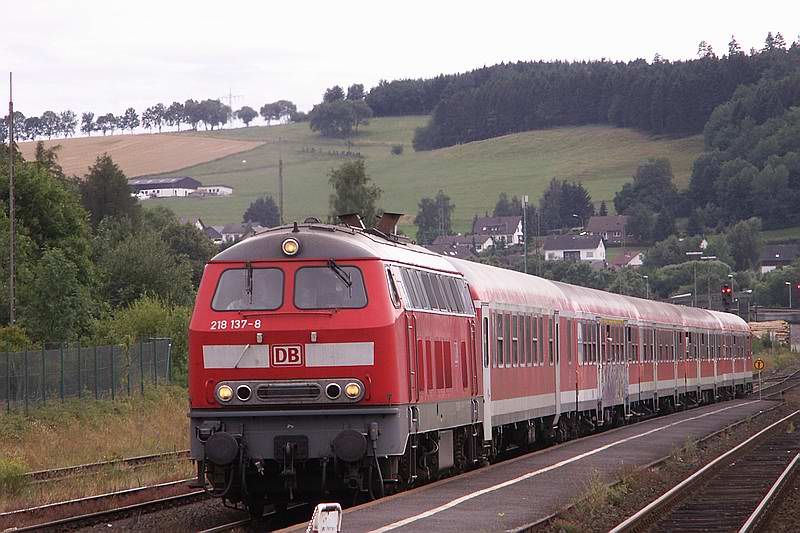
Class 218 operating as Eifel-Mosel-Express in Kall (2006)

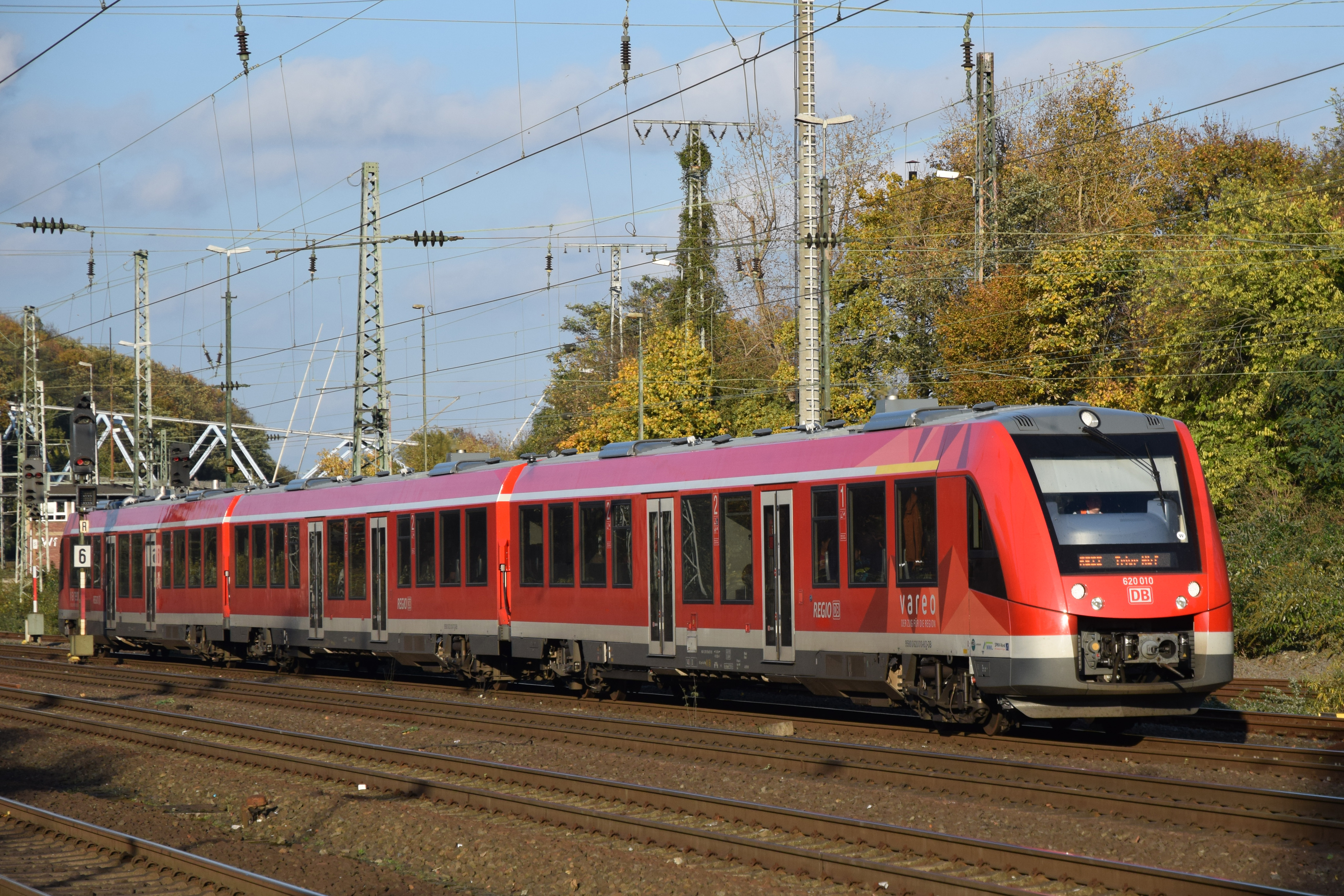
LINT 81 in Köln West (2014)
