= Leverkusen-Manfort station =

Railway station in Germany

Leverkusen Manfort
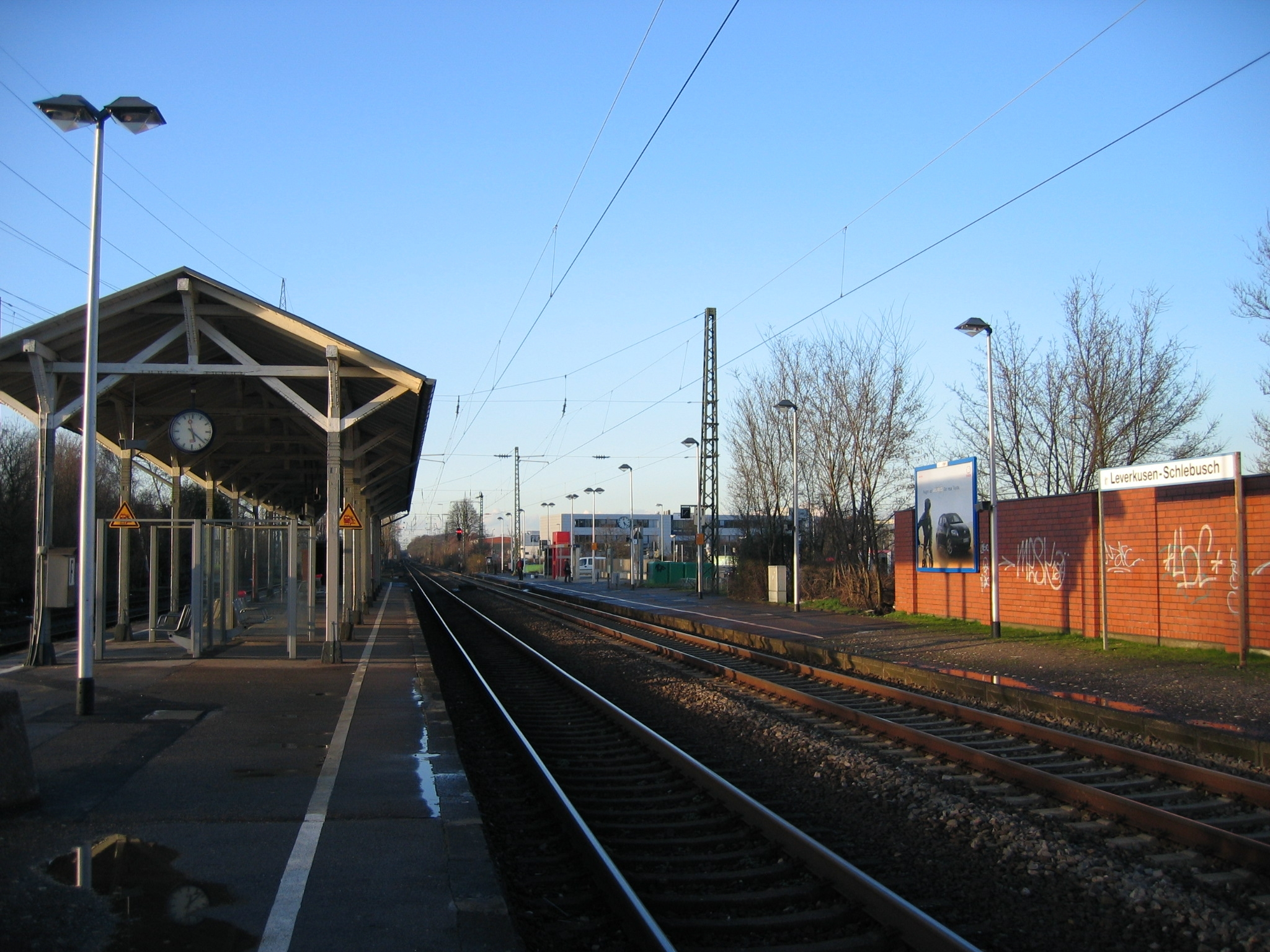

General information
- Location: Moosweg 2, Leverkusen, NRW; Germany
- Coordinates: 51°01′52″N 7°00′54″E
- Lines: Gruiten–Köln-Deutz (KBS 455)
- Platforms: 3

Construction
- Accessible: Only platform 1

Other information
- Station code: 3694
- DS100 code: KLS
- IBNR: 8003669
- Category: 5
- Fare zone: VRS: 2200
- Website: www.bahnhof.de

History
- Opened: 25 August 1867
- Former names: Leverkusen-Schlebusch

Services
Preceding station	National Express Germany	Following station
Köln-Mülheim towards Bonn-Mehlem	RB 48 (Rhein-Wupper-Bahn)	Opladen towards Wuppertal-Oberbarmen
Location
- Location within North Rhine-Westphalia

Leverkusen-Manfort station is a through station in the district of Manfort of the city of Leverkusen in the German state of North Rhine-Westphalia. It was named after the nearby town of Schlebusch and opened on 25 August 1867 on the Gruiten–Köln-Deutz railway, which was completed between the former Bergisch-Märkische Railway Company (BME) station in Mülheim and Opladen by the BME on 1 May 1868. It received its current name in December 2021. It has three platform tracks and it is classified by Deutsche Bahn as a category 5 station.

The station is served by the Rhein-Wupper-Bahn (RB 48) between Wuppertal-Oberbarmen and Cologne twice an hour during the day, with one train an hour to/from Bonn-Mehlem.

It is also served by eight bus routes operated by Kraftverkehr Wupper-Sieg: 209 (at 20 minute intervals), 210 (20), 211 (20), 212 (20), 217 (once a day), 222 (20), 226 (4 times a day) and 227 (20).

In December 2021, the station was renamed from Leverkusen-Schlebusch to Leverkusen-Manfort.
