= Köln-Mülheim station =

Railway station in Mülheim, Germany

Köln Mülheim
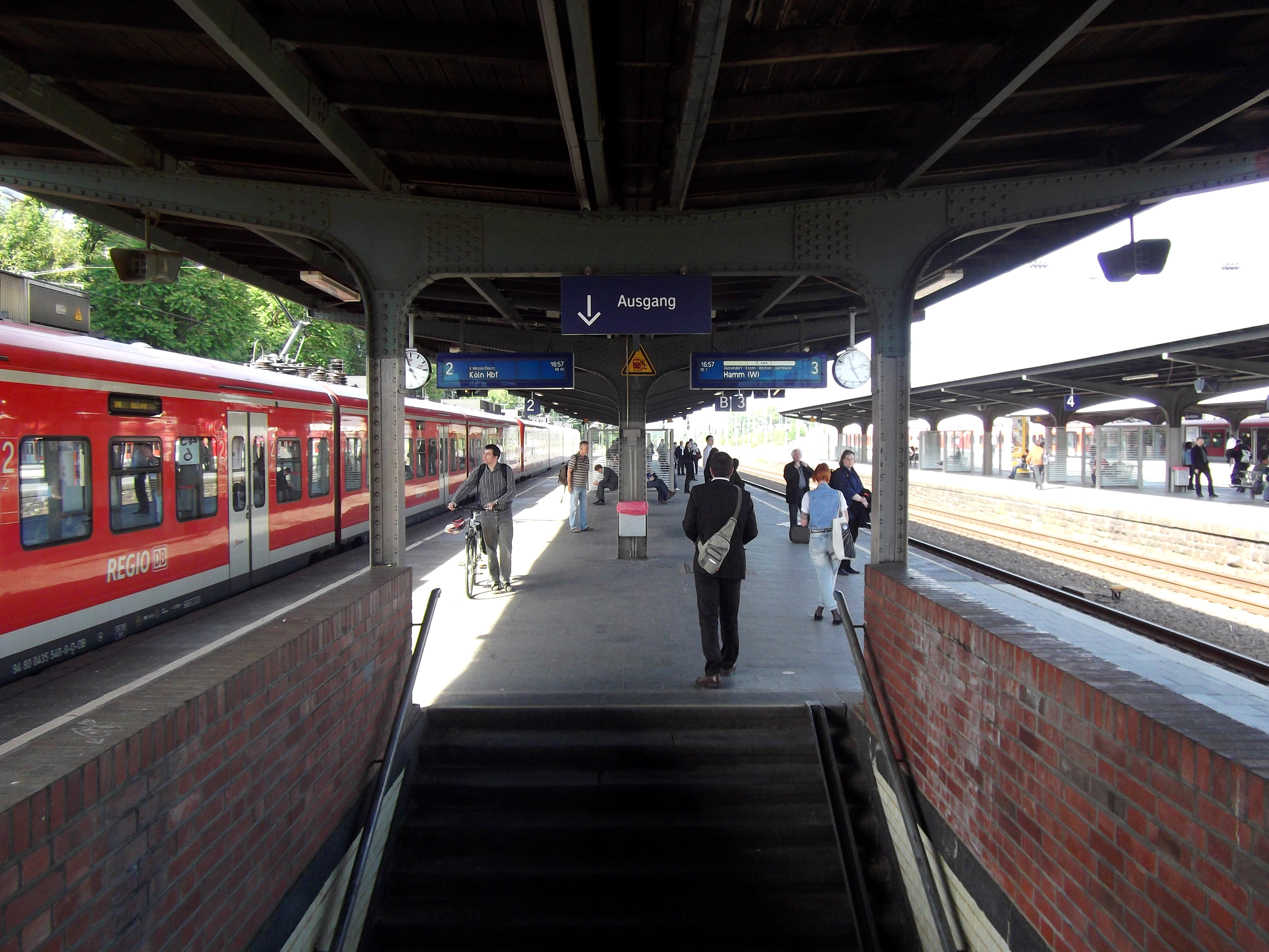
- Platforms at Köln-Mülheim station

General information
- Location: Montanusstraße; 51065 Köln-Mülheim; Mülheim, Cologne (Köln), NRW; Germany
- Coordinates: 50°57′31″N 7°00′49″E
- Lines: Cologne–Duisburg railway; Sülz Valley Railway
- Platforms: 4
- Tracks: 7

Construction
- Accessible: Yes (S-Bahn platforms only)

Other information
- Station code: 3336
- DS100 code: KKM
- Category: 4
- Fare zone: VRS: 2100
- Website: www.bahnhof.de

History
- Opened: 19 November 1874

Services
Preceding station	National Express Germany	Following station
Köln Messe/Deutz towards Aachen Hbf	RE 1 (NRW-Express)	Leverkusen Mitte towards Hamm (Westf) Hbf
Köln Messe/Deutz towards Koblenz Hbf	RE 5 (Rhein-Express)	Leverkusen Mitte towards Wesel
Köln Messe/Deutz towards Bonn-Mehlem	RB 48 (Rhein-Wupper-Bahn)	Leverkusen-Schlebusch towards Wuppertal-Oberbarmen
Preceding station	Rhine-Ruhr S-Bahn	Following station
Köln-Buchforst towards Köln-Nippes	S6	Köln-Stammheim towards Essen Hbf
Preceding station	Cologne S-Bahn	Following station
Köln-Buchforst towards Düsseldorf Airport Terminal	S11	Köln-Holweide towards Bergisch Gladbach
Preceding station	Cologne Stadtbahn	Following station
Wiener Platz towards Sülzgürtel	Line 13	Buchheim Herler Straße towards Holweide Vischeringstraße
Wiener Platz towards Bonn Hbf	Line 18	Buchheim Herler Straße towards Thielenbruch
Location
- Location within North Rhine-Westphalia

Köln-Mülheim is a railway station situated at Mülheim, Cologne in western Germany. It is served by several regional trains, the S6 and S11 S-Bahn lines and the 13 and 18 lines of Cologne Stadtbahn.

== History ==
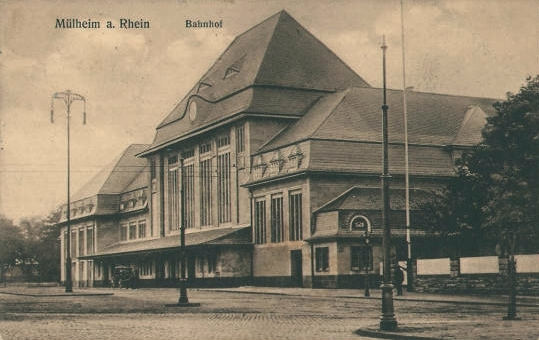
New Mulheim station in 1910

In the 19th century there were several stations in Mülheim, since all the private railway companies had separate lines and railway facilities.

The stations of the Cologne-Minden Railway Company (German: Cöln-Mindener Eisenbahn-Gesellschaft, CME) on the line between Cologne and Duisburg and the Bergisch-Märkische Railway Company (Bergisch-Märkische Eisenbahn-Gesellschaft, BME) on the Gruiten–Cologne-Deutz railway) were next to each other in Buchheim-Strasse (now Wiener Platz). The station of the Rhenish Railway Company (Rheinische Eisenbahn-Gesellschaft, RhE) on the Troisdorf–Mülheim-Speldorf railway was built outside the town at the site of the current Cologne-Mülheim station.

After the nationalisation of the railway companies there was long consideration of how to consolidate rail operations at one site. Eventually it was decided to tear down stations of the CME and BME and move the lines serving them to the east. Construction began in 1903 and on 1 July 1909 the new station was inaugurated and the all freight and passenger traffic were routed over the rerouted lines.

Today the station is a hub for regional and S-Bahn traffic in northeastern Cologne and an important point of interchange between regional and local transport.

=== Historical development ===
- 1874: Opening of the Troisdorf–Mülheim-Speldorf railway of the Rhenish Railway Company
- 1909: Construction of the station at its present site in Mülheim
- 1944: Destruction of the station building in bombing raids
- 1951: Reconstruction of the station building in a simplified form
- 1975: Opening of S-Bahn operations (Bergisch Gladbach–Cologne–Köln-Chorweiler)
- 1990: Opening of the S-Bahn main line
- 1997: Opening of the underground Stadtbahn station
- since 2004: Reconstruction of the track network as part of the line upgrade to Köln Messe/Deutz station (low level)

== Train services ==
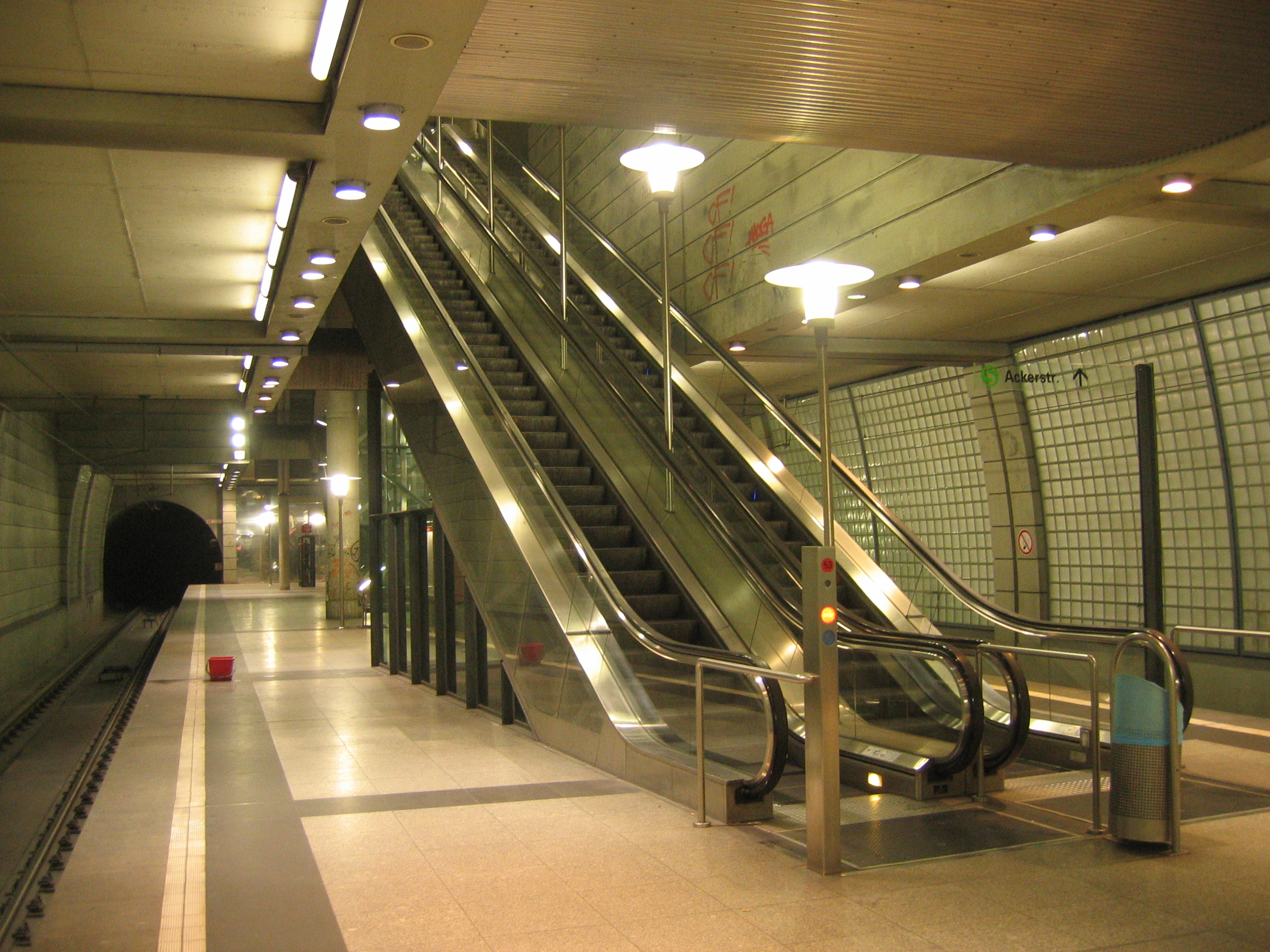
Köln-Mülheim U-Bahn station

The station is served by the following services:

- Regional services RE 1 NRW-Express Aachen - Cologne - Düsseldorf - Duisburg - Essen - Dortmund - Hamm - Paderborn
- Regional services RE 5 Rhein-Express Emmerich - Wesel - Oberhausen - Duisburg - Düsseldorf - Cologne - Bonn - Koblenz
- Local services RB 48 Rhein-Wupper-Bahn Bonn-Mehlem - Bonn - Cologne - Solingen - Wuppertal
- Rhein-Ruhr S-Bahn services S6 Essen - Kettwig - Düsseldorf - Cologne - Köln-Nippes
- Cologne S-Bahn services S11 Düsseldorf Airport Terminal - Düsseldorf - Neuss - Cologne - Bergisch Gladbach
