= Opladen station =

Railway station in Leverkusen, Germany

Opladen
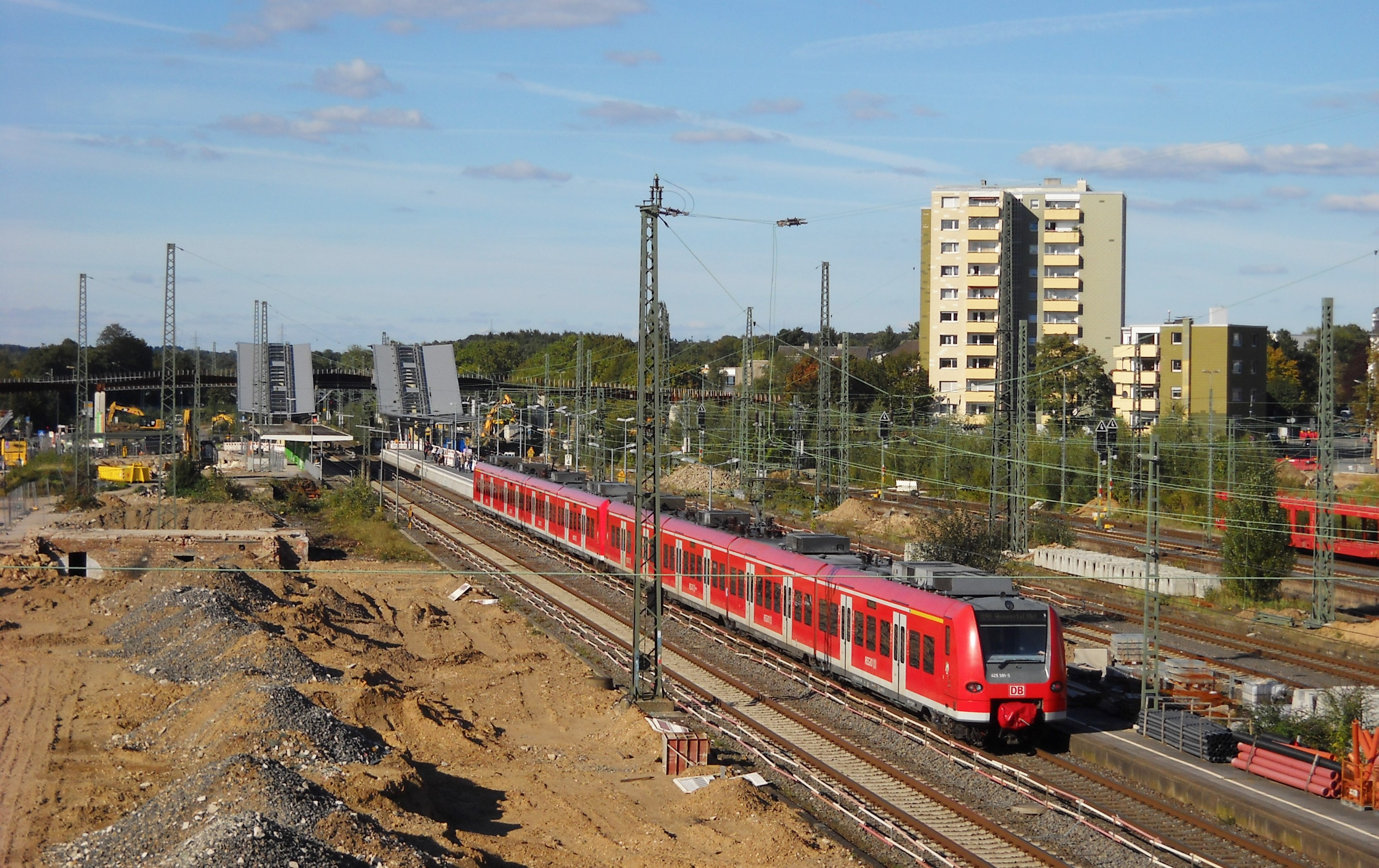
- Station under reconstruction in September 2015

General information
- Location: Bahnhofstr. 35, Opladen, NRW; Germany
- Coordinates: 51°03′57″N 7°00′31″E
- Lines: Gruiten–Köln-Deutz (KBS 455)
- Platforms: 2

Construction
- Accessible: Yes

Other information
- Station code: 4770
- DS100 code: KOPL
- IBNR: 8000853
- Category: 4
- Fare zone: VRS: 2200
- Website: www.bahnhof.de

History
- Opened: 25 August 1867

Services
Preceding station	National Express Germany	Following station
Köln Messe/Deutz towards Krefeld Hbf	RE 7 (Rhein-Münsterland-Express)	Solingen Hbf towards Rheine
Leverkusen-Schlebusch towards Bonn-Mehlem	RB 48 (Rhein-Wupper-Bahn)	Leichlingen towards Wuppertal-Oberbarmen
Location

Opladen station is in the suburb of Opladen of the city of Leverkusen in the German state of North Rhine-Westphalia. It is on the Gruiten–Köln-Deutz railway, which was opened on 25 September 1867 from Ohligs by the Bergisch-Märkische Railway Company (BME). It was extended to Mülheim BME station on 8 April 1868. The station was also opened on 25 August 1867. The original station building was demolished in 1965 and replaced by a building built in 1968. This building was demolished in 2015 to allow the relocation of the freight tracks of the Troisdorf–Mülheim-Speldorf railway and thereby reduce the separation of Opladen and Quettingen created by largely abandoned rail tracks. It is classified by Deutsche Bahn as a category 4 station.

The station is served hourly by Regional-Express line RE 7 Rhein-Münsterland-Express between Krefeld and Münster via Cologne and Hamm. It is also served every 30 minutes between 5am to 8pm by Regionalbahn RB 48 Rhein-Wupper-Bahn, stopping at all stations between Wuppertal-Oberbarmen and Cologne, continuing every hour to Bonn-Mehlem.

It serves a bus station which serves lines operated by Wupsi: 201 (Lützenkirchen–Chempark S), 202 (Opladen–Schlebusch Stadtbahn), 203 (Opladen–Burrig), 205 (Opladen–Schlebusch Stadtbahn via Lützenkirchen), 206 (Langenfeld–Mathildenhof), 215 (Opladen–Hitdorf), SB24 (Wermelskirchen–Wiesdorf), SB26 (Opladen–Schlebusch via Alkenrath).

Some of these lines go to other cities: 222 (Opladen–Bergisch Gladbach), 232 [together with 206] (Langenfeld–Opladen), 253 (Leichlingen–Opladen), 255 (Leichlingen–Chempark S), SB25 (Solingen–Cologne Main Station).
