= Leichlingen station =

Railway station in Germany

Leichlingen
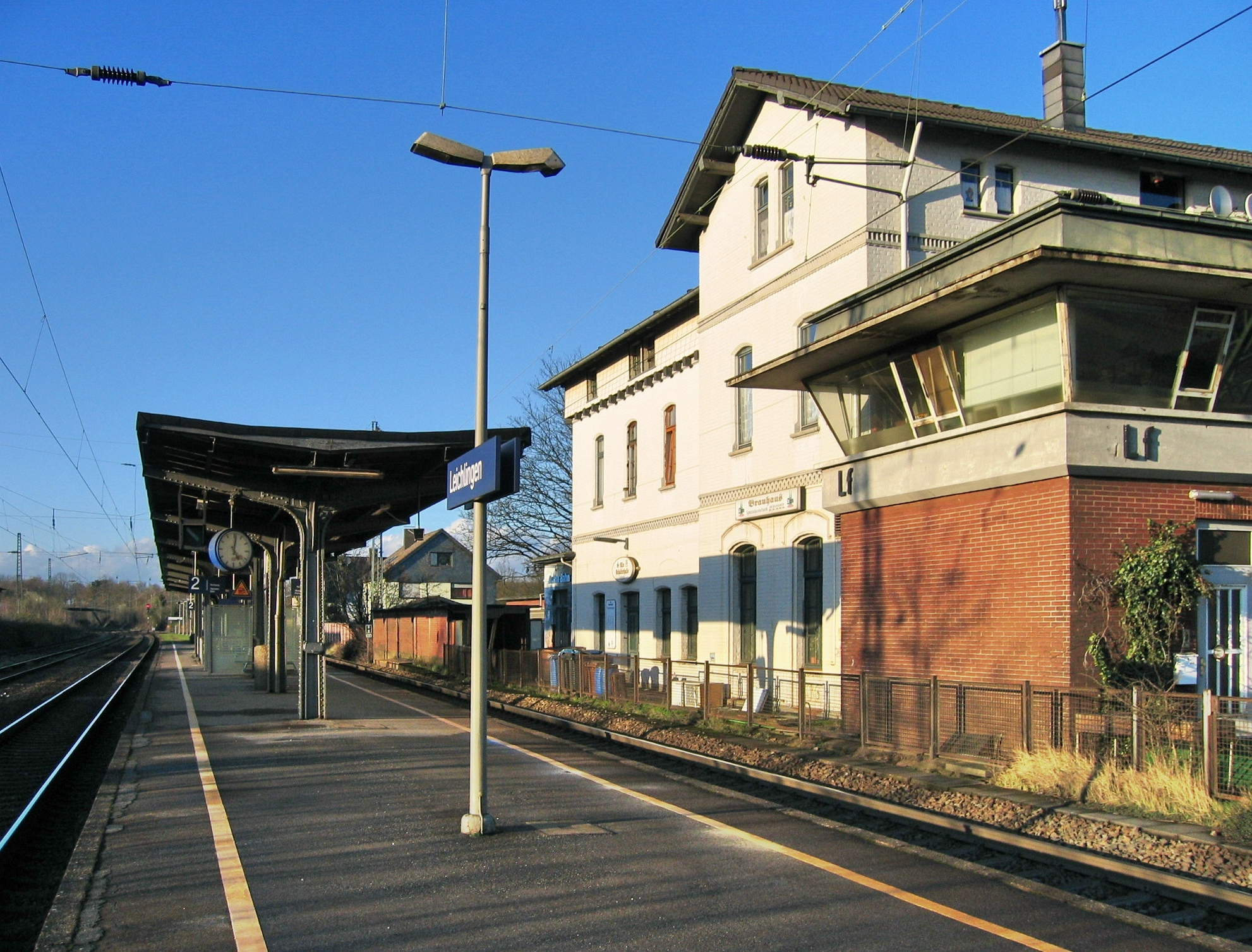

General information
- Location: Bahnhofstraße 33c, Leichlingen, NRW; Germany
- Coordinates: 51°06′28″N 7°00′19″E
- Lines: Gruiten–Köln-Deutz (KBS 455)
- Platforms: 2

Construction
- Accessible: Yes

Other information
- Station code: 3621
- DS100 code: KLEL
- IBNR: 8003616
- Category: 5
- Fare zone: VRS: 2330
- Website: www.bahnhof.de

History
- Opened: 25 August 1867

Services
Preceding station	National Express Germany	Following station
Opladen towards Bonn-Mehlem	RB 48 (Rhein-Wupper-Bahn)	Solingen Hbf towards Wuppertal-Oberbarmen
Location

Leichlingen station is a through station in the town of Leichlingen in the German state of North Rhine-Westphalia. It was opened on 25 August 1867 on the Gruiten–Köln-Deutz railway, which was completed between Gruiten and Opladen by the Bergisch-Märkische Railway Company on 25 September 1867. It has two platform tracks and it is classified by Deutsche Bahn as a category 5 station.

The station is served by the Rhein-Wupper-Bahn (RB 48) between Wuppertal-Oberbarmen and Cologne twice an hour during the day, with one train an hour to/from Bonn-Mehlem.

It is also served by two bus routes operated by Hüttebräucker: 253 (once a day) and 254 (at 60 minute intervals). It is served by bus route 255, operated by Wiedenhoff at 20–40 minute intervals and by bus route 694, operated by Stadtwerke Solingen at 30–60 minute intervals.
