= Köln Messe/Deutz station =

Railway station in Germany

Köln Messe/Deutz
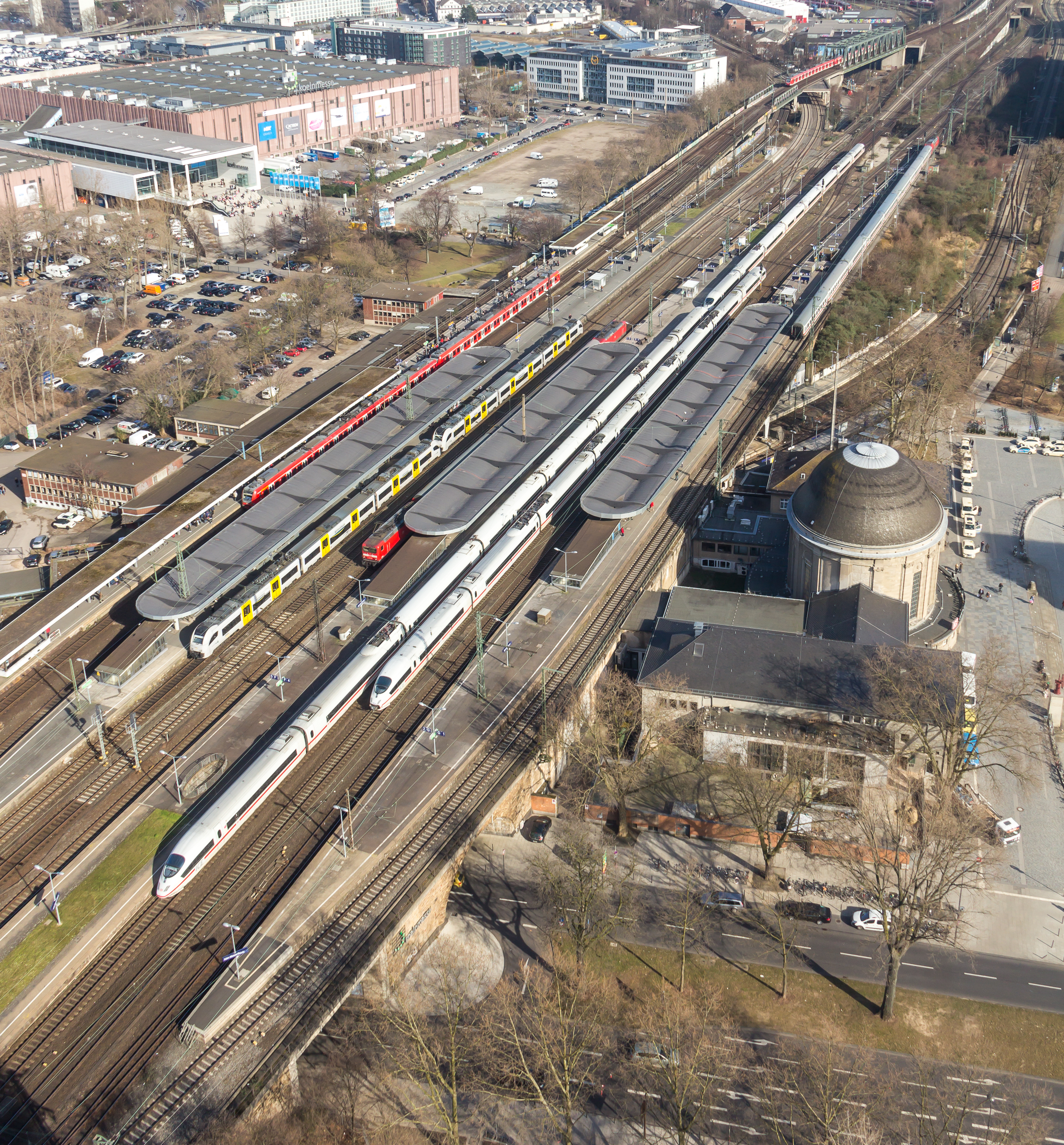
- Overview of Köln Messe/Deutz station

General information
- Location: Ottoplatz 7 Innenstadt (Deutz), Cologne, North Rhine-Westphalia; Germany
- Coordinates: 50°56′27″N 6°58′30″E
- Lines: Cologne–Duisburg (KBS 415, 450.6); West Rhine Railway; Gruiten–Cologne-Deutz (KBS 455); (Cologne-Bergisch Gladbach KBS 450.11); Sieg Railway (KBS 450.12/13, 460); (East Rhine Railway via Sieg Railway, KBS 465); (Cologne–Frankfurt HSL via Sieg Railway, KBS 472); Deutz/Kalk Stadtbahn tunnel
- Platforms: 5
- Tracks: 10

Construction
- Accessible: Yes (platforms 9-12 only)

Other information
- Station code: 3329
- DS100 code: KKDZ (high, platforms 1–8); KKDZB (S-Bahn, platforms 9–10); KKDT (low, platforms 11–12)
- IBNR: 8003368
- Category: 1
- Fare zone: VRS: 2100
- Website: www.bahnhof.de

History
- Opened: 20 December 1845 (CME); 11 November 1913 (PSE)
Services
Preceding station	DB Fernverkehr	Following station
Düsseldorf Hbf Terminus	ICE 2 Sprinter	Frankfurt Airport towards Stuttgart Hbf
Düsseldorf Hbf towards Dortmund Hbf or Essen Hbf	ICE 41 lower platforms tief)	Frankfurt Airport towards München Hbf
Düsseldorf Hbf towards Dortmund Hbf	ICE 47 lower platforms (tief)	Cologne/Bonn Airport towards München Hbf
Düsseldorf Hbf towards Münster Hbf	ICE 62	Frankfurt Airport towards Graz Hbf
Düsseldorf Hbf towards Amsterdam Centraal	ICE 78	Siegburg/Bonn towards München Hbf
Preceding station	DB Regio NRW	Following station
Köln Hbf towards Mönchengladbach Hbf	RE 8	Porz (Rhein) towards Koblenz Hbf
Köln Hbf towards Aachen Hbf	RE 9	Porz (Rhein) towards Siegen Hbf
Köln Hbf towards Trier Hbf	RE 12	Terminus
Köln Hbf towards Gerolstein	RE 22	Terminus
Köln Hbf towards Gerolstein	RB 24	Terminus
Köln Hbf towards Köln Hansaring	RB 25	Köln-Trimbornstraße towards Lüdenscheid
Köln Hbf towards Mönchengladbach Hbf	RB 27	Cologne/Bonn Airport towards Koblenz Hbf
Köln Hbf towards Bedburg	RB 38	Terminus
Preceding station	National Express Germany	Following station
Köln Hbf towards Aachen Hbf	RE 1 (NRW-Express)	Köln-Mülheim towards Hamm (Westf) Hbf
Köln Hbf towards Koblenz Hbf	RE 5 (Rhein-Express)	Köln-Mülheim towards Wesel
Köln Hbf towards Minden	RE 6 (Rhein-Weser-Express)	Cologne/Bonn Airport Terminus
Köln Hbf towards Krefeld Hbf	RE 7 (Rhein-Münsterland-Express)	Köln-Mülheim towards Rheine
Köln Hbf towards Bonn-Mehlem	RB 48 (Rhein-Wupper-Bahn)	Köln-Mülheim towards Wuppertal-Oberbarmen
Preceding station	Trans Regio	Following station
Köln Hbf towards Mainz Hbf	RB 26	Terminus
Preceding station	Rhine-Ruhr S-Bahn	Following station
Köln Hbf towards Köln-Nippes	S6	Köln-Buchforst towards Essen Hbf
Preceding station	Cologne S-Bahn	Following station
Köln Hbf towards Düsseldorf Airport Terminal	S11	Köln-Buchforst towards Bergisch Gladbach
Köln Hbf towards Horrem	S12	Köln-Trimbornstraße towards Au (Sieg)
Köln Hbf towards Düren	S19	Köln-Trimbornstraße towards Au (Sieg)
Preceding station	Cologne Stadtbahn	Following station
Deutzer Freiheit towards Köln-Weiden West	Line 1	Deutz Technische Hochschule towards Bensberg
Deutzer Freiheit towards Sülz Hermeskeiler Platz	Line 9	Deutz Technische Hochschule towards Königsforst
Suevenstraße towards Görlinger-Zentrum	Line 3	Koelnmesse towards Thielenbruch
Suevenstraße towards Bocklemünd	Line 4	Koelnmesse towards Schlebusch
Location

Köln Messe/Deutz station (called Köln-Deutz until November 2004, Colognian: Düx, pronounced [dʏks]) is an important railway junction for long-distance rail and local services in the Deutz neighborhood of Cologne in the German state of North Rhine-Westphalia. It is situated close to the eastern bank of the Rhine and connected via the Hohenzollern Bridge to Köln Hauptbahnhof, the city's main station, which is just a few hundred metres away. The Cologne Trade Fair (German: Koelnmesse) grounds are directly north of the station, hence the Messe in the station's name. The stations Bahnhof Deutz/Messe (lines 1 and 9) and Bahnhof Deutz/Lanxess Arena (lines 3 and 4) of the Cologne Stadtbahn is nearby and connected to this station by a pedestrian tunnel.

Köln Messe/Deutz is a junction station, which has platforms on two levels: the high-level platforms are used by trains running in the east–west direction across the Hohenzollern Bridge to and from Köln Hauptbahnhof. The lower level (Köln Messe/Deutz tief) is used by trains running in a north–south direction bypassing the Hauptbahnhof between Köln-Mülheim station and Troisdorf. It serves an important function in providing some relief for the Köln Hauptbahnhof bottleneck—some ICE services call at Köln-Deutz instead, eliminating the need for changing direction, while many regional trains from the west terminate here.

== History ==
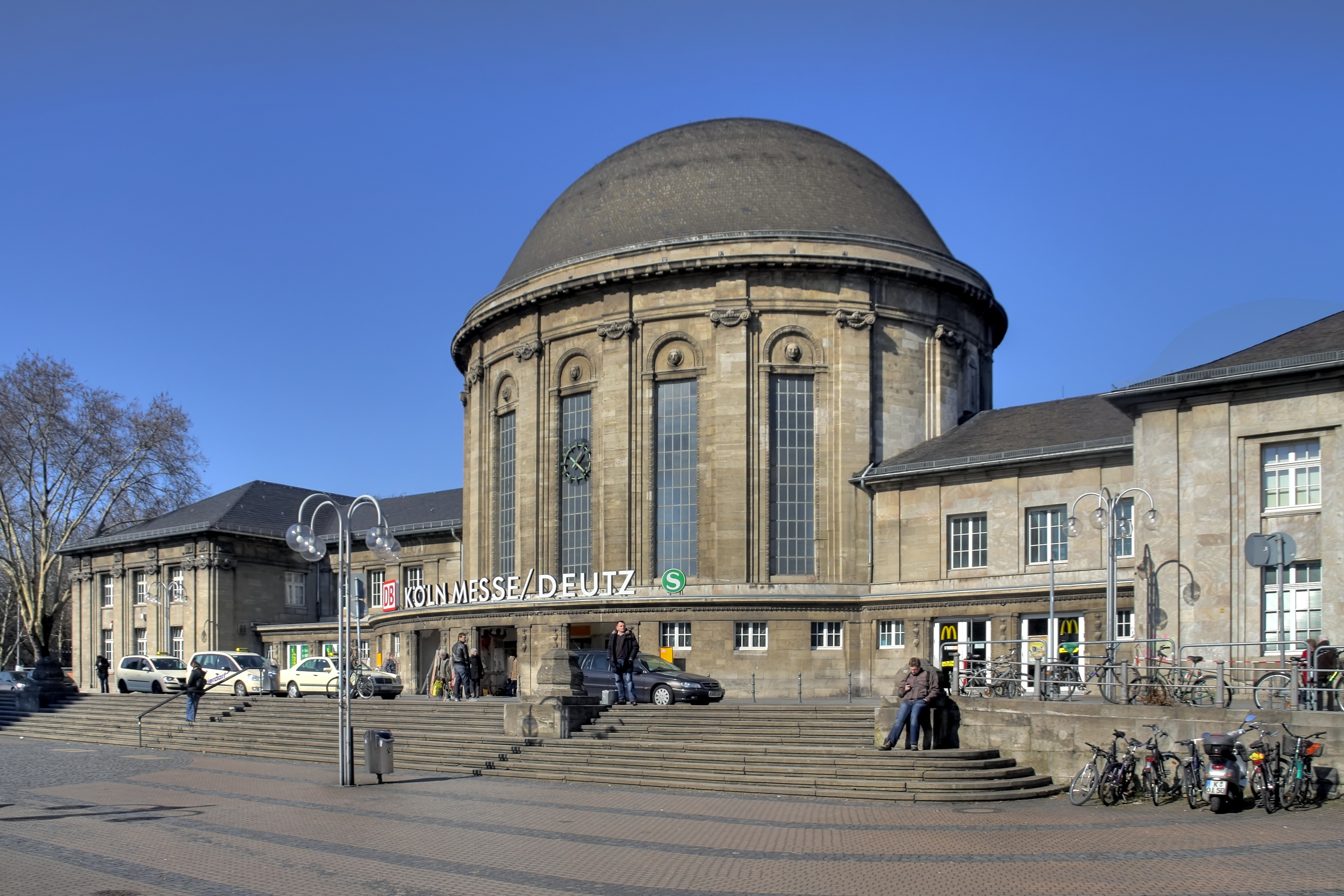
Köln Messe/Deutz station building

The current Köln Messe/Deutz station was developed from several predecessors built from 1845 and the basic structure of the current station was opened on 11 November 1913. It gradually replaced the four stations of the competing companies, the Cologne-Minden Railway Company (Cöln-Mindener Eisenbahn-Gesellschaft, CME), and the Bergisch-Märkische Railway Company (Bergisch-Märkische Eisenbahn-Gesellschaft, BME). The reception building, a three-wing structure with a central dome, was designed by architect Hugo Röttcher and built in 1914.

In anticipation of the building of a bridge, or at least a steam ferry, across the Rhine to the station of the Rhenish Railway Company (Rheinische Eisenbahn-Gesellschaft, RhE) at Trankgasse (at the south-eastern end of the current Hauptbahnhof) on the opposite bank with connections to Aachen and Antwerp, a terminus was completed as a starting point of the CME's line to Düsseldorf southwest of the present station near the Rhine on 20 December 1845. Two through tracks to the Rhine are also visible on old maps. The line was later extended via Duisburg and Dortmund to Minden, connecting to Berlin.

In 1859, the station also became the starting point of the Deutz–Gießen railway, which was being built. At the same time, the first permanent bridge was built across the Rhine since Roman times, the Cathedral Bridge, popularly known as the Mouse Trap (Kölsch: Muusfall, pronounced [ˈmus²fal]), between Deutz and Cologne in order to connect the railway lines on the east and west side of the Rhine. The old station facilities were expanded and supplemented to provide platforms on the new line. Deutz station remained as a terminal station for normal passenger trains, while National Express trains ran to Cologne Hauptbahnhof. Originally a simple interchange station for services to and from Deutz, Cologne, Minden and Gießen was planned nearby at Köln-Deutzerfeld, which later became the site of a shunting and marshalling yard, but this was not implemented.

On 1 October 1886, the platforms of the Cologne-Minden terminal station that was built in 1845 were closed and passenger trains were directed to the Bergisch-Märkische station at Schiffbrücke. Until the rebuilding of the railway infrastructure at Deutz, in particular the construction of the Deutzerfeld marshalling and shunting between 1911 and 1913, the old terminus was mainly used as a freight yard.

In 1913, the stations known since the nationalisation of the Bergisch-Märkische railway and its absorption into the (Prussian state railways, PSE) in 1882, as Deutzerfeld (Deutz field) and Schiffbrücke (floating bridge), were demolished and the lines were connected to the new Deutz station. The former Deutzerfeld station, sometimes also referred to as Deutz-Nord, was in the area of the later trade fair, now the RTL building. Schiffbrücke station, also called Brückenbahnhof (bridge station), was at the floating bridge that crossed the Rhine to Cologne at the site of the current Deutz Suspension Bridge between 1822 and 1915. The name Deutzer Feld was later applied to the shunting and marshalling yard of Köln-Deutzerfeld, which is further to the east.

After the destruction of the Second World War, the station was simplified and rebuilt without the large platform area. Subsequent modifications and extensions followed.

During the Nazi period, almost all Jews living in Cologne were deported to extermination camps from the low level of Deutz station. The first such transport occurred in October 1941 and the last known movement was on 1 October 1944 to the Theresienstadt concentration camp. The exhibition halls were used as a transit camp.

The three spans of the train shed, which had iron and glass elements, were destroyed in the Second World War and were replaced after the war by concrete platform canopies. Parts of the system of tunnels and the entire station forecourt (Ottoplatz) are registered in the list of monuments of the city of Cologne.

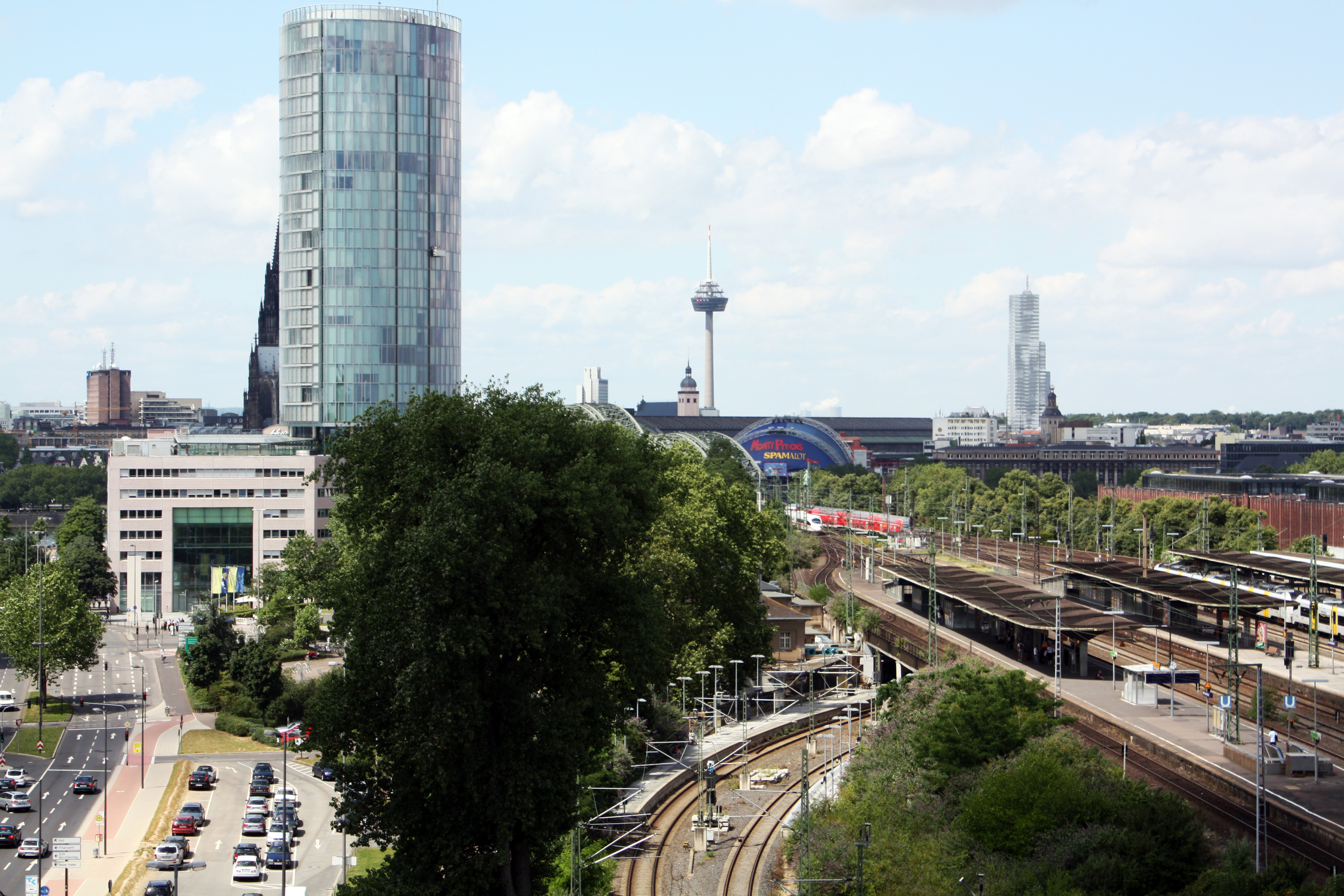
Upper and lower platforms of Köln Messe/Deutz station

From 1988, the city of Cologne developed a concept plan for reshaping Intercity-Express (ICE) operations in the Cologne area as part of the planned high-speed line to Frankfurt. The core of the plan was the use of the Köln-Deutz station as an ICE station.

The Council of the City of Cologne (another source indicates it was the CEO of Deutsche Bahn AG) decided in 1996 that Deutz station would be rebuilt as a terminal for ICE services at the end of 1997. Deutsche Bahn determined that some new ICE services on the planned Cologne-Rhine/Main high-speed line would start or terminate at Deutz station. In December 1997, the management board of Deutsche Bahn (DB) agreed to the redevelopment of the station in several stages. When finally in 1998 the Cologne Trade Fair decided to build a new building for its administration, it was decided to establish a public-private partnership in 1999 involving DB Station&Service, the city and the Trade Fair.

In mid-1999, the Köln-Messe/Deutz ICE terminal was submitted to an international architectural competition and received 57 proposals. Both urban and transport issues were taken into account. Eight finalists were selected. The project affected 22 hectares (54 acres) of land and 150,000 square metres of floor area. The objectives included the extension and adaptation of the two low level platforms for ICE traffic and the duplication of the access track. An expansion to four ICE platforms was considered. The plan also included an 800-metre (2,624 ft 8 in)-long, covered moving walkway that would have connected the station to Cologne Hauptbahnhof. This competition was judged by DB, the city of Cologne and the Cologne Trade Fair and was concluded in 2000. The development scheme was submitted for planning approval in October 2000. The estimated cost of the overall concept of 140 million Marks was funded by DB, the city of Cologne and the Trade Fair. A glass roof with a length of 120 metres (393 ft 8 in), which should span the entire station was calculated to cost an additional DM 40 million.

On 8 November 2001 construction began on the modernisation of the low-level platforms 11 and 12. The renovated track layout allowed an hourly ICE train to run in each direction to and from the Bahnhof Köln-Deutz from the opening of the new line in December 2002. Later, this number should be increased to three to four trains per hour. €10.9 million was invested in the modernisation of the two outer platforms of the low-level station and other measures.

The station was named Köln-Deutz until 11 December 2004, but then as a result of a campaign by the Cologne Trade Fair, which is located next to the station, it was renamed. The cost of the renaming of the station was borne by the Trade Fair, which hoped to gain greater patronage as a result of the renaming. Since 3 November 2006 the trade fair is directly connected via the newly constructed south entrance to the station. The distance to the closest entrance of the fair halls is about 120 meters.

== Infrastructure ==
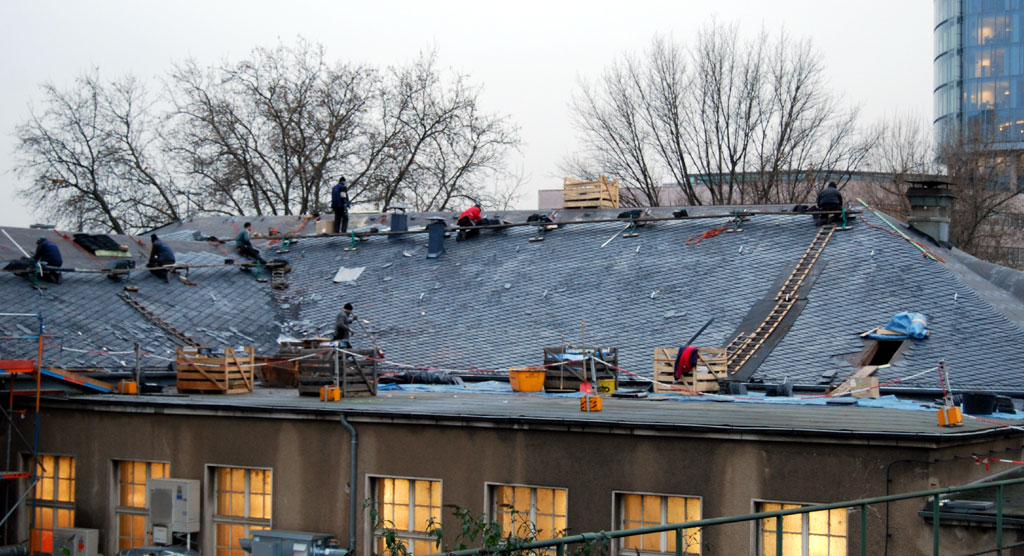
Roof of the station building with the installation of new slate (2008)

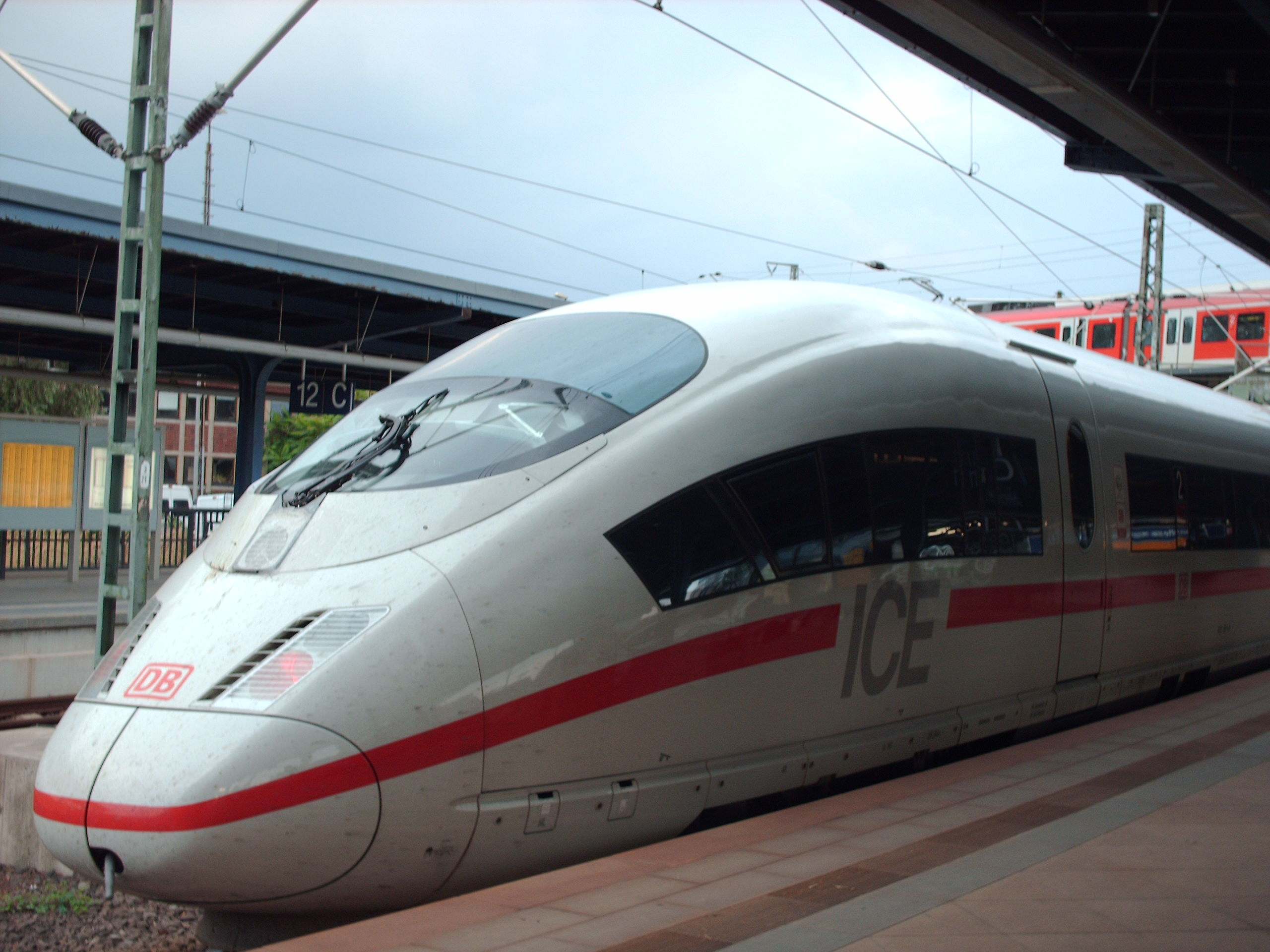
An ICE service from Köln Messe/Deutz (tief) running to the south and an S-Bahn service in the background from the S-Bahn station running towards the Hauptbahnhof

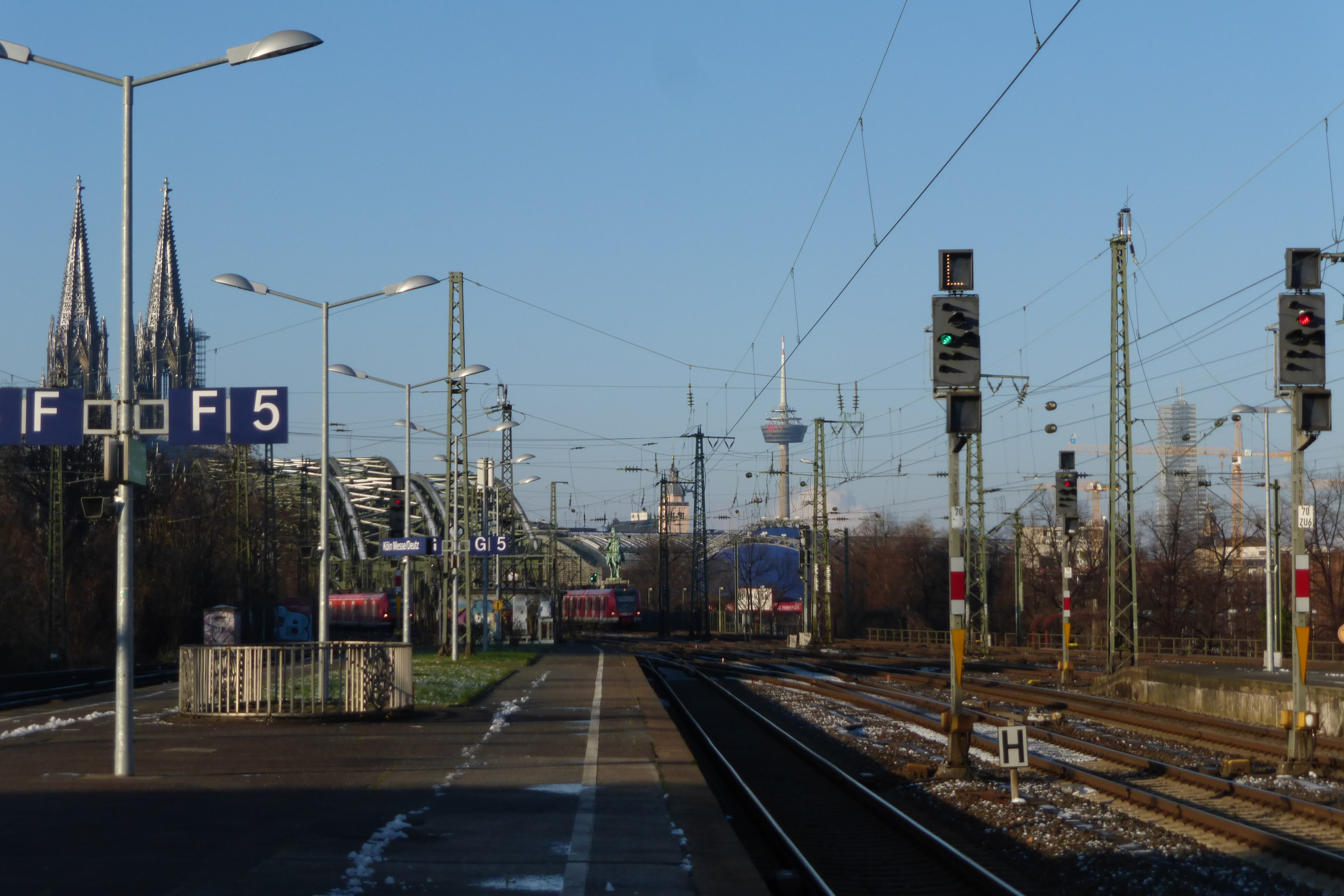
S-Bahn platform with a view of Cologne Cathedral (left) and Colonius telecommunications tower (right)

The high level section of Köln Messe/Deutz station consists of six platform tracks on three platforms and two through tracks without access to platforms. Directly next to it is the S-Bahn station of Köln Messe/Deutz Hp, which has two platform tracks at its own platform and was built between 1985 and 1990 during the development of the Cologne S-Bahn network and the associated construction of the third set of double tracks on the Hohenzollern Bridge.

Köln Messe/Deutz tief (low level) station was completely rebuilt during the construction of the Cologne–Frankfurt high-speed rail line. It is served by ICE lines 10 (Berlin–Cologne/Bonn Airport) and 41 (Essen–Munich) on two tracks. These run directly to the north or south without passing through the Hauptbahnhof to save running twice over the Hohenzollern Bridge and reversing.

The access from the north to Köln Messe/Deutz tief was duplicated up to December 2007 and the speed limit was raised to 100 km/h (62 mph). The low-level station was closed from 10 December 2006 to 8 December 2007 to carry out the upgrade. The southern connection to Gummersbacher Straße junction was initially single track but a second track was added at the beginning of 2010.

DB's operating locations directory uses the station codes of KKDZ (Köln Messe/Deutz) and KKDT (Köln Messe/Deutz tief) and KKDZB (the S-Bahn stop of Köln Messe/Deutz Hp).

== Planning ==
The Zweckverband Nahverkehr Rheinland (association for local transport of the Rhineland) has agreed that the Köln Messe/Deutz station will be retrofitted with four lifts to allow barrier-free access to all platforms (currently only tracks 10 and 11 are accessible by wheelchair). It will be possible to reach platform track 12 in the low-level station without passing through barriers (and without the previous, major detour from the Stadtbahn tunnel), as an additional access from the Stadtbahn tunnel to track 12 will also be built.

At a summit of DB, the federal government and the state of North Rhine-Westphalia on 31 March 2010 in Düsseldorf, it was decided that the station should be extended up to 2019 for €11 million. The entrance from the Trade Fair to the station will be extended to a side platform to the S-Bahn to accelerate entry and exit. However, it is still being considered whether two new S-Bahn tracks will also be needed, as is planned at the Hauptbahnhof.

== Rail services ==
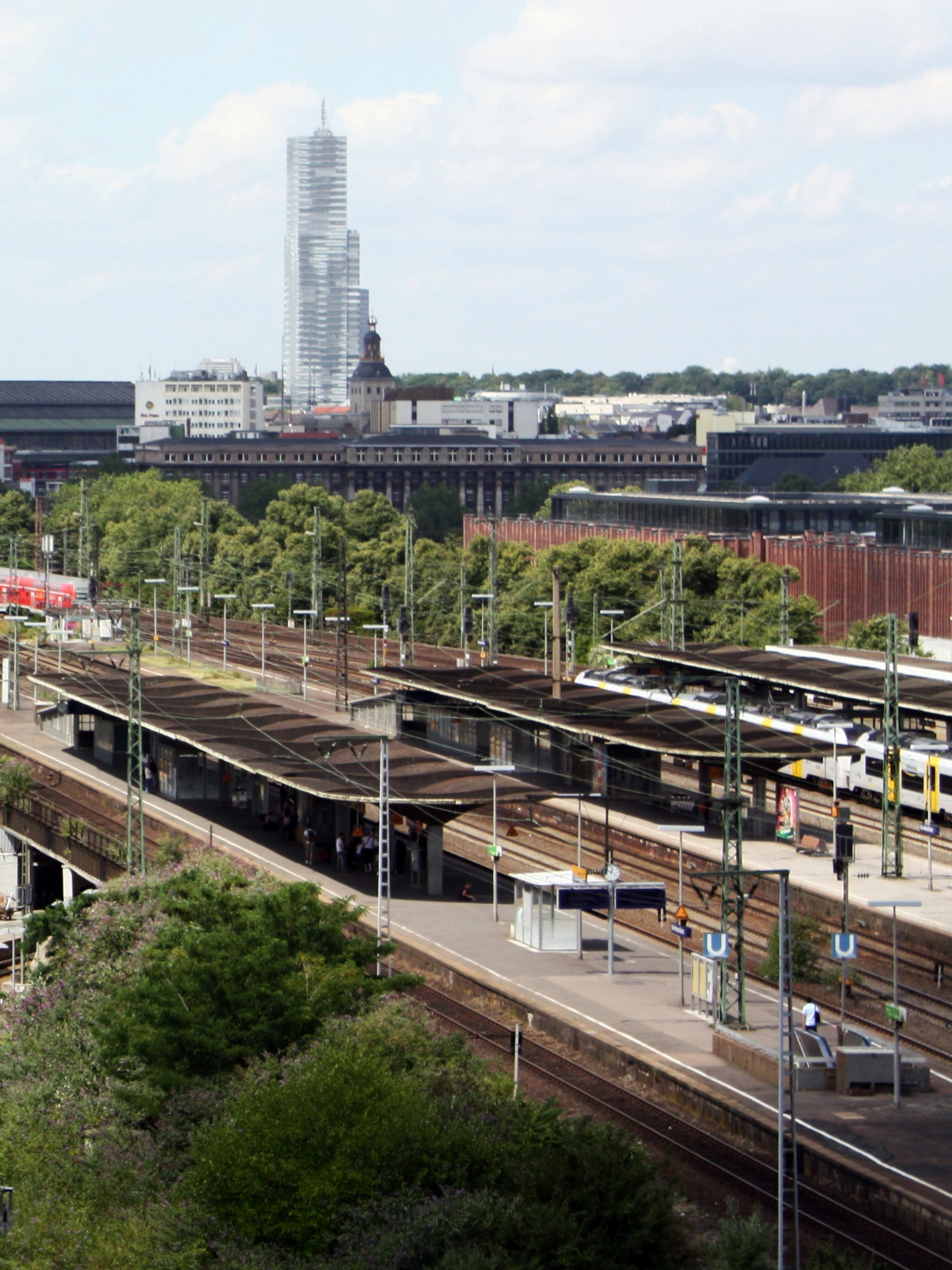
Platforms and tracks on elevated level. Front of the trade fair halls in the background behind the row of trees.

In 2026, the station was served by the following services:

=== Long-distance services ===
Line	Route	Frequency
ICE 41	(Dortmund –) Essen – Duisburg – Düsseldorf – Köln Messe/Deutz – Frankfurt Airport – Frankfurt – Würzburg – Nuremberg – Munich	Hourly
ICE 47	Dortmund – Essen – Duisburg – Düsseldorf – Köln Messe/Deutz – Frankfurt Airport – Mannheim – Stuttgart	Every 2 hours

=== Regional services ===
Line	Route	Frequency
RE 1 NRW-Express	Aachen – Eschweiler – Düren – Horrem – Cologne – Köln Messe/Deutz – Düsseldorf – Düsseldorf Airport – Duisburg – Mülheim – Essen – Bochum – Dortmund – Hamm	Hourly
RE 5 Rhein-Express	Wesel – Duisburg – Düsseldorf Airport – Düsseldorf Hbf – Köln Messe/Deutz – Cologne – Bonn – Remagen – Andernach – Koblenz	Hourly
RE 6 Rhein-Weser-Express	Minden – Herford – Bielefeld – Hamm – Dortmund – Essen – Mülheim – Duisburg – Düsseldorf Airport – Düsseldorf Hbf – Neuss – Cologne – Köln Messe/Deutz – Cologne/Bonn Airport	Hourly
RE 7 Rhein-Münsterland-Express	Rheine – Münster – Hamm – Hagen – Wuppertal – Solingen – Köln Messe/Deutz – Cologne – Neuss – Krefeld	Hourly
RE 8 Rhein-Erft-Express	(Kaldenkirchen) – Mönchengladbach – Grevenbroich – Rommerskirchen – Cologne – Köln Messe/Deutz – Porz (Rhein) – Troisdorf – Bonn-Beuel – Linz am Rhein – Koblenz Stadtmitte – Koblenz	Hourly
RE 9 Rhein-Sieg-Express	Aachen – Düren – Cologne – Köln Messe/Deutz – Troisdorf – Siegburg/Bonn – Au (Sieg) – Siegen	Hourly
RE 22/ RB 22; Eifel-Express	Köln Messe/Deutz – Cologne – Euskirchen – Gerolstein – Trier	Hourly
RB 26; MittelrheinBahn	Köln Messe/Deutz – Cologne – Bonn – Koblenz – Koblenz – Bingen – Mainz	Hourly
RB 27; Rhein-Erft-Bahn	Mönchengladbach – Grevenbroich – Rommerskirchen – Cologne – Köln Messe/Deutz – Cologne/Bonn Airport – Troisdorf – Bonn-Beuel – Linz am Rhein – Neuwied – Engers – Koblenz-Ehrenbreitstein – Koblenz	Hourly
RB 38; Erft-Bahn	Düsseldorf – Neuss – Grevenbroich – Bedburg – Bergheim – Cologne – Köln Messe/Deutz	Hourly; 30 min (Bedburg–Horrem on weekdays)
RB 48; Rhein-Wupper-Bahn	Wuppertal-Oberbarmen – Solingen – Köln Messe/Deutz – Cologne – Bonn – Bonn-Mehlem	30 min (W-Oberbarmen–Cologne); 30 (peak)/60 min (Cologne–Bonn); Hourly (Bonn–Bonn-Mehlem)
S6	Köln-Nippes – Cologne – Köln Messe/Deutz – Langenfeld – Düsseldorf Hbf – Ratingen Ost – Essen	20 min
S11	Düsseldorf Flughafen Terminal – Düsseldorf – Neuss – Dormagen – Köln Messe/Deutz – Cologne – Bergisch Gladbach	20 min
S12	Horrem – Cologne – Köln Messe/Deutz – Troisdorf – Siegburg/Bonn – Hennef – Au	20 min (Horrem–Hennef) 60 min (Hennef–Au)
S19	Düren – Horrem – Cologne – Köln Messe/Deutz – Köln/Bonn Airport – Troisdorf – Siegburg/Bonn – Hennef – Au	20/40 min (Horrem–Hennef); 60 min (Hennef–Au)

=== Stadbahn services ===
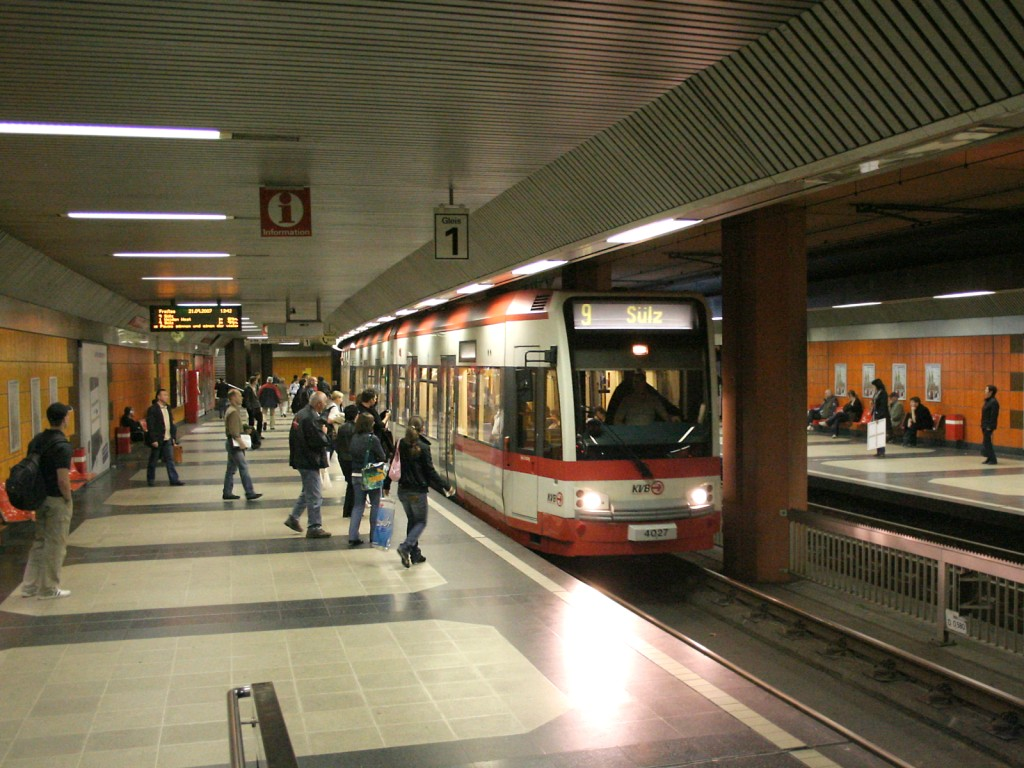
Stadtbahn tracks

Immediately below tracks 1–10 is the Stadtbahn station Deutz/Messe. This station serves the lines 1 and 9. A shopping area connects it to the Stadtbahn station Deutz/LANXESSarena, where the line 3 and 4 depart.

== See also ==
- Rail transport in Germany
- Railway stations in Germany
