= Duisburg-Bissingheim station =

Railway station in Duisburg, Germany

Duisburg-Bissingheim
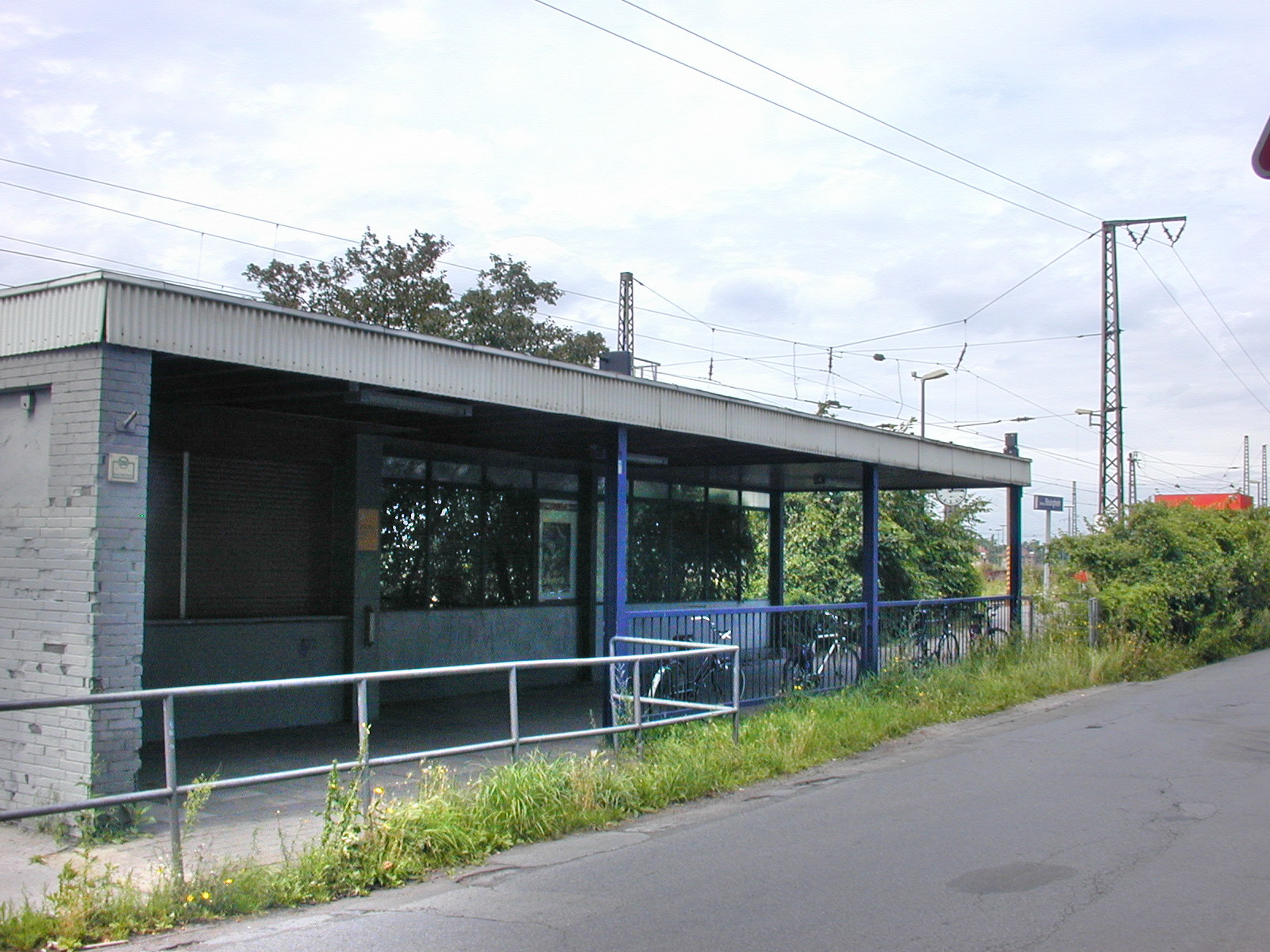
- 2007

General information
- Location: Bissingheimer Straße 250; 47279 Duisburg; North Rhine-Westphalia; Germany
- Coordinates: 51.3921°N 6.8082°E
- Owner: DB Netz
- Operator: DB Station&Service
- Line: Troisdorf–Mülheim-Speldorf railway
- Platforms: 1 side platform
- Train operators: DB Regio NRW

Other information
- Station code: 1376
- DS100 code: EDBI
- IBNR: 8001599
- Category: 7
- Fare zone: VRR: 332
- Website: www.bahnhof.de
Location
- Location within North Rhine-Westphalia

Duisburg-Bissingheim station is a former railway station in the Bissingheim district in the town of Duisburg, located in North Rhine-Westphalia, Germany. It was closed in 2019.
