= Opladen =

District of Leverkusen, Germany

Coordinates: 51°04′N 7°01′E

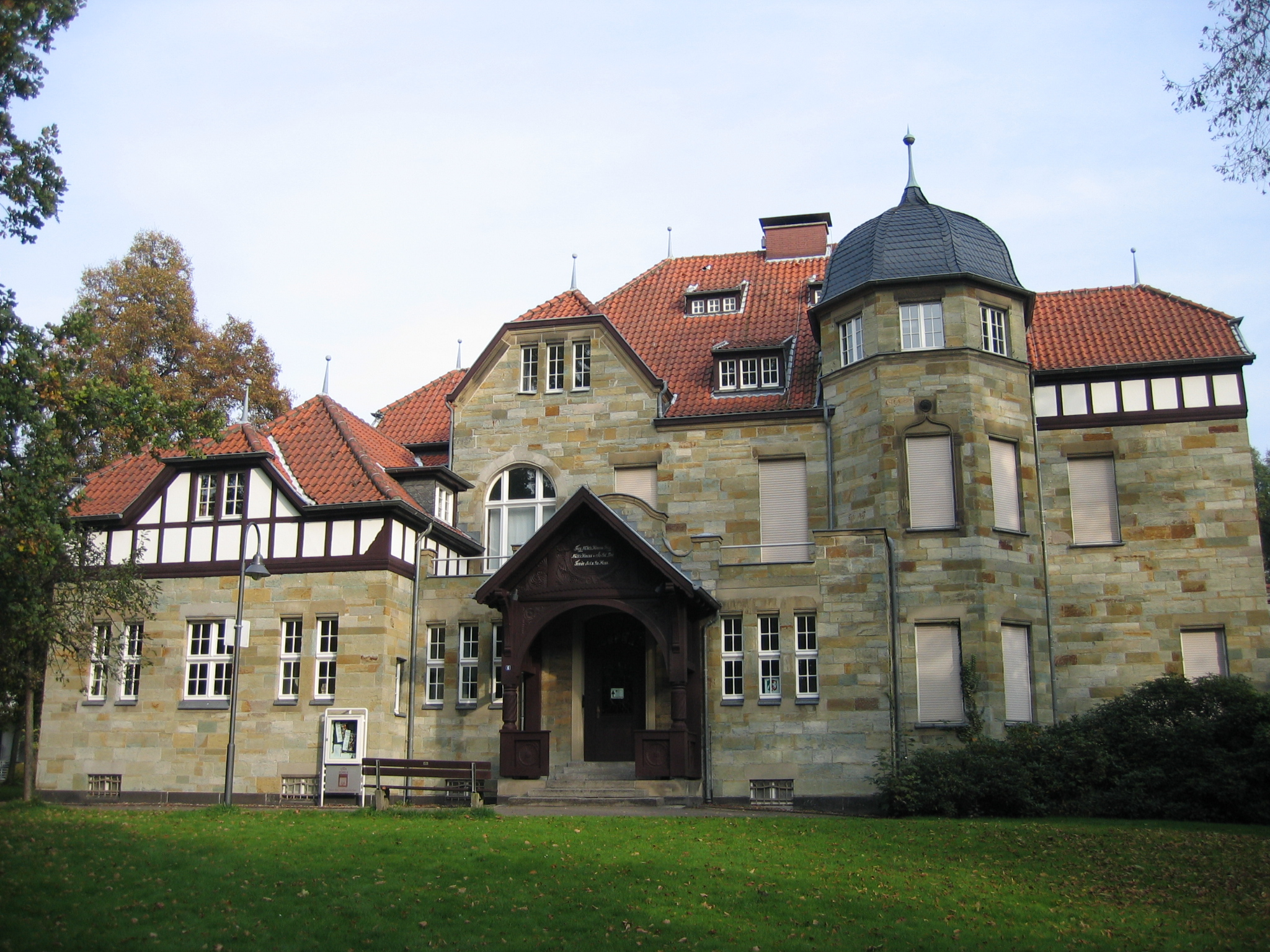
Villa Römer

Opladen, now a district of Leverkusen, used to be the capital of the Rhein-Wupper-Kreis (Rhine-Wupper-District) until 1975. Opladen station is located 15 kilometres (9.3 mi) northeast from Cologne on the railway to Wuppertal. It is also on the Autobahn A3. Population (1905) was 6338, (1975) 42,000.

Opladen has several Evangelical and Roman Catholic churches. It used to have dyeing works, manufactures of dynamite, indigo products, publishing companies and a railway plant. Before passing to Prussia, Opladen belonged to the duchy of Berg.
