= Gruiten–Köln-Deutz railway =

Railway line in Germany

Gruiten–Köln-Deutz

Overview
- Line number: 2730 (Gruiten–Köln Neurather Ring); 2731 (Gruiten–Linden junction); 2652/9 (Köln Neurather Ring–Köln-Deutz); 2660 (Köln-Mülheim–Köln-Deutz)
- Locale: North Rhine-Westphalia, Germany

Service
- Route number: 455

Technical
- Line length: 35 km (22 mi)
- Track gauge: 1,435 mm (4 ft 8 1/2 in) standard gauge
- Electrification: 15 kV/16.7 Hz AC overhead catenary
- Operating speed: 160 km/h (99.4 mph) (maximum)

The Gruiten–Cologne-Deutz railway is a major German railway. It is part of a major axis for long distance and regional rail services between Wuppertal and Cologne, and is served by Intercity Express, InterCity, Regional-Express and regionalbahn trains.

The route is fully electrified. The last piece of single-track, the section between Köln-Mülheim station and Köln Messe/Deutz station (low level) was duplicated in 2009.

== History ==
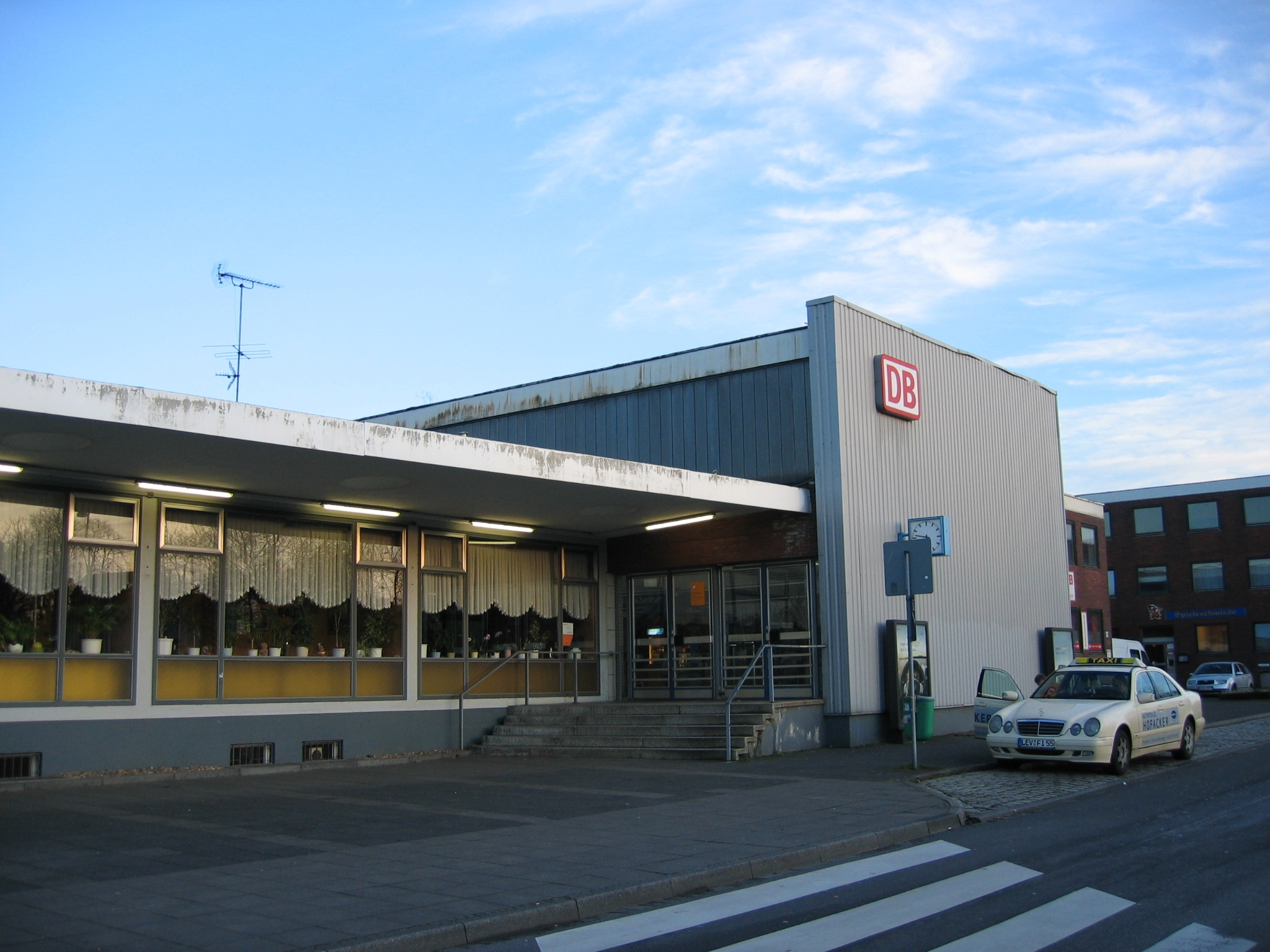
Opladen station (demolished 2016)

The route was built as a branch of the Dusseldorf–Elberfeld line by the Bergisch-Märkische Railway Company (BME) after its acquisition of the Dusseldorf-Elberfeld Railway Company. It would connect the BME's core network in the southern and central Ruhr with the railway node of Cologne, which was already served by the Rhenish Railway Company (RhE) and the Cologne-Minden Railway Company (CME).

The BME began construction of its new line from the site of the current Gruiten station. Today the route separates from the line from Wuppertal nearly two kilometres earlier at Linden junction. The first section ran due south through Ohligs Wald (later Ohligs and Solingen-Ohlings, and now Solingen Hauptbahnhof) to Opladen and was opened on 25 September 1867.

On 8 April 1868 the line was opened to Mülheim (Rhein) BME station just to the east of the existing Mülheim (Rhein) CME station in Wiener Platz. The line formerly ran straight through the centre of Mülheim on a route almost identical with the current course of line 4 of the Cologne Stadtbahn.

The BME subsequently extended its track across the CME track and ran down the bank of the Rhine to a new terminus at Deutz BME station, north of Deutz CME station opened for passenger traffic on 1 February 1872. In 1909 the line in the Mülheim area was moved east because of the risk of flooding and lack of space in central Mülheim to a route running through the new Köln-Mülheim station, built on the site of the RHE's Mülheim (Rhein) station.

== Services ==
The line is served hourly by Regional-Express line RE 7 Rhein-Münsterland-Express between Krefeld and Rheine via Cologne, Hamm and Münster, stopping at Köln Messe/Deutz, Opladen, Solingen and Wuppertal. It is also served every 30 minutes between 5am to 8pm by Regionalbahn RB 48 Rhein-Wupper-Bahn, stopping at all stations between Wuppertal-Oberbarmen and Cologne, continuing every hour to Bonn-Mehlem.

The line is served every hour by Intercity Express line 10, connecting Cologne and Berlin via Hamm, Hanover, stopping at Wuppertal. Additional InterCity trains also operate between Cologne and Hamm on IC lines 31 and 55 every 2 hours.
