= Rhein-Wupper-Bahn =

Railway line in North Rhine-Westphalia, Germany

RB 48 Rhein-Wupper-Bahn
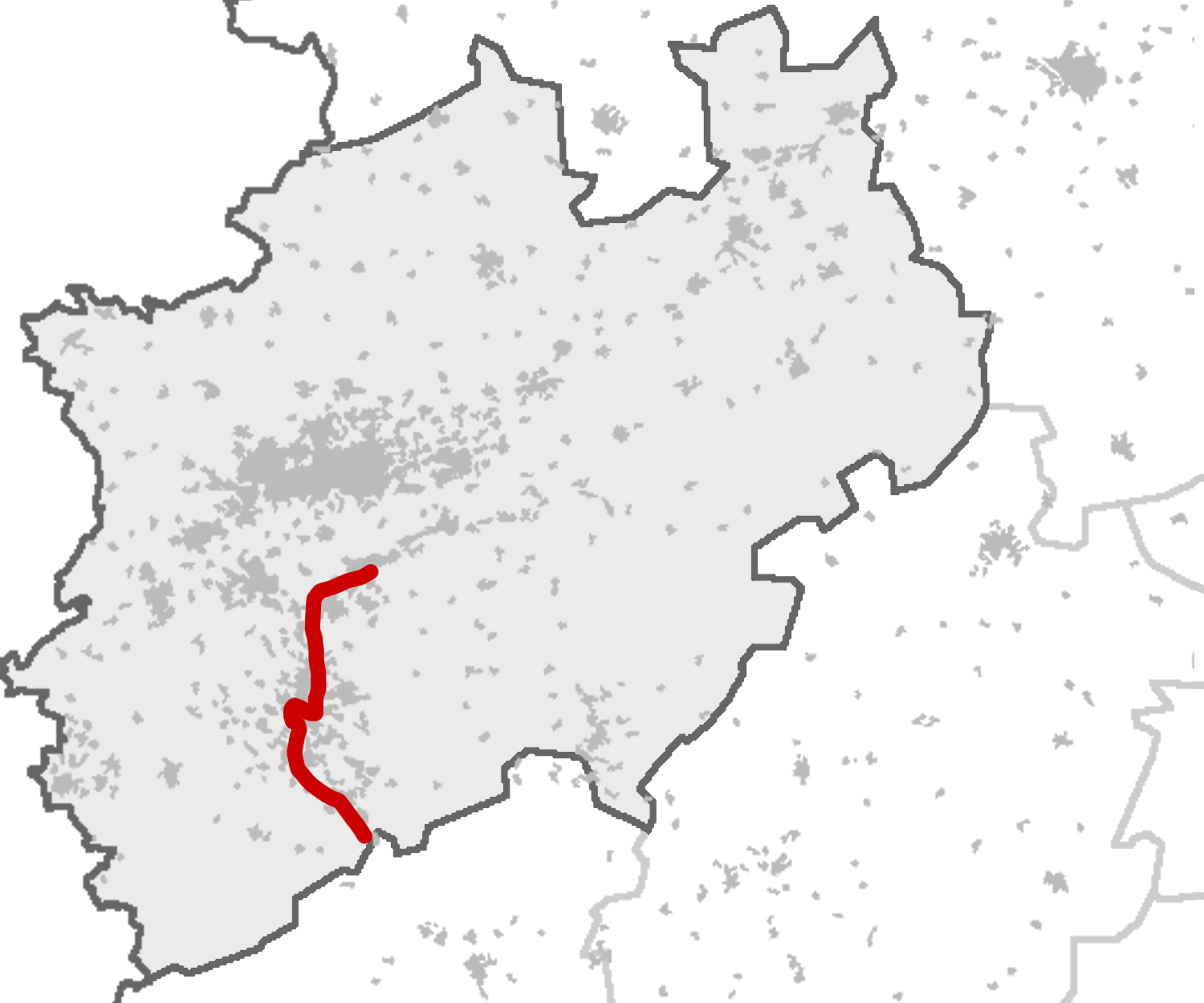
- Route within North Rhine-Westphalia

Overview
- Locale: North Rhine-Westphalia, Germany

Service
- Route number: 455, 470

Technical
- Line length: 97 km (60 mi)
- Operating speed: 140 km/h (87 mph) (maximum)

The Rhein-Wupper-Bahn is a Regionalbahn service in the German state of North Rhine-Westphalia. It connects the cities of Wuppertal, Solingen, Leverkusen, Cologne and Bonn and it is operated by National Express.

== Route ==
The line runs mainly over the tracks of three railway lines:

- from Wuppertal Hauptbahnhof to Gruiten station over the Düsseldorf–Elberfeld railway, built from 1838 to 1841 by the Düsseldorf-Elberfeld Railway Company,
- from Gruiten to Köln-Mülheim station over the Gruiten–Köln-Deutz railway, opened on 25 September 1867 and 8 April 1868 by the Bergisch-Märkische Railway Company and
- from Cologne Hauptbahnhof to Bonn-Mehlem over the West Rhine Railway, opened on 15 February 1844 by the Bonn–Cologne Railway Company and extended to Koblenz on 11 November 1858 by the Rhenish Railway Company.

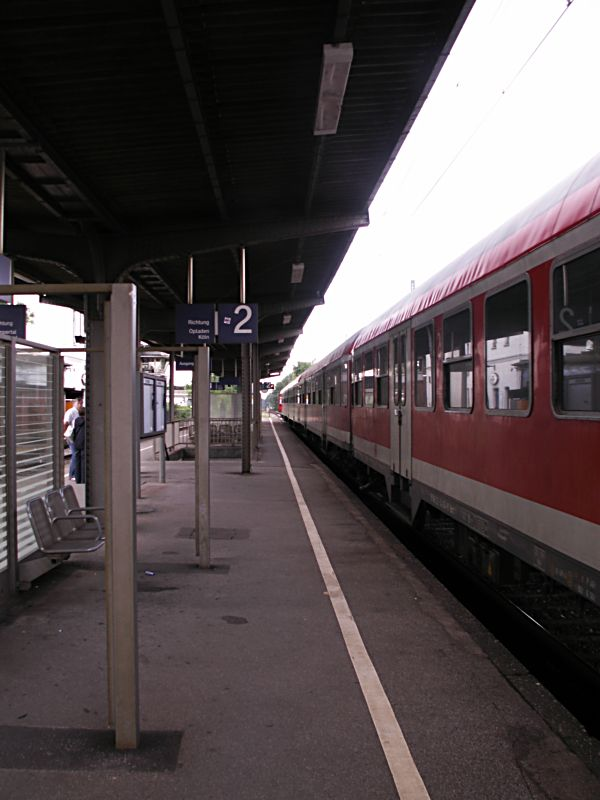
RB 48 in Leichlingen

The trains of the Rhein-Wupper-Bahn (RB 48) stop at all stations on the line. They run daily from 5 am to 20 pm at hourly intervals between Wuppertal Hauptbahnhof and Bonn-Mehlem. Additional services run from Wuppertal to Cologne every hour, so on this section there is a service approximately 30-minutes.

Until December 2007, the service ran to Wuppertal-Oberbarmen, but was shortened due to a reduction in federal funding and operated only in the off-peak. The service to Wuppertal-Oberbarmen was restored in December 2015. The section of the line in Rhineland-Palatinate that was formerly served regularly, was served from 2003 to 2015 by only one service operated to Remagen in the evening and returning next morning. Since December 2015, the service south of Bonn-Mehlem has been abandoned entirely.

== Rolling stock ==
Since December 2015, Bombardier Talent 2 EMUs have been operated by National Express. They run regularly as a five car set coupled to a three car set. National Express also holds two spare sets of coaches and locomotives of class 182 (EuroSprinter) for the operation on the RB 48.

Until the timetable change in December 2007, the Rhein-Wupper-Bahn was operated mostly using locomotive-hauled push–pull trains. These were usually made up of five “n-carriages” (Silberling), hauled by class 111 electric locomotives. Trains were often hauled by class 110 locomotives and occasionally class 425 electric multiple units in coupled sets were operated. After December 2007, RB 48 were at first operated only with class 425 in coupled sets. The ET 425 sets became available when Abellio Rail NRW won some tenders for operating services in North Rhine-Westphalia. Between the minor change of timetable in June 2009 and the regular timetable change in December 2009, some services were again operated with class 110 locomotives with five to six n-carriages, as not enough carriages were available due to the need for software modifications to the ET 425 vehicles.

== History ==
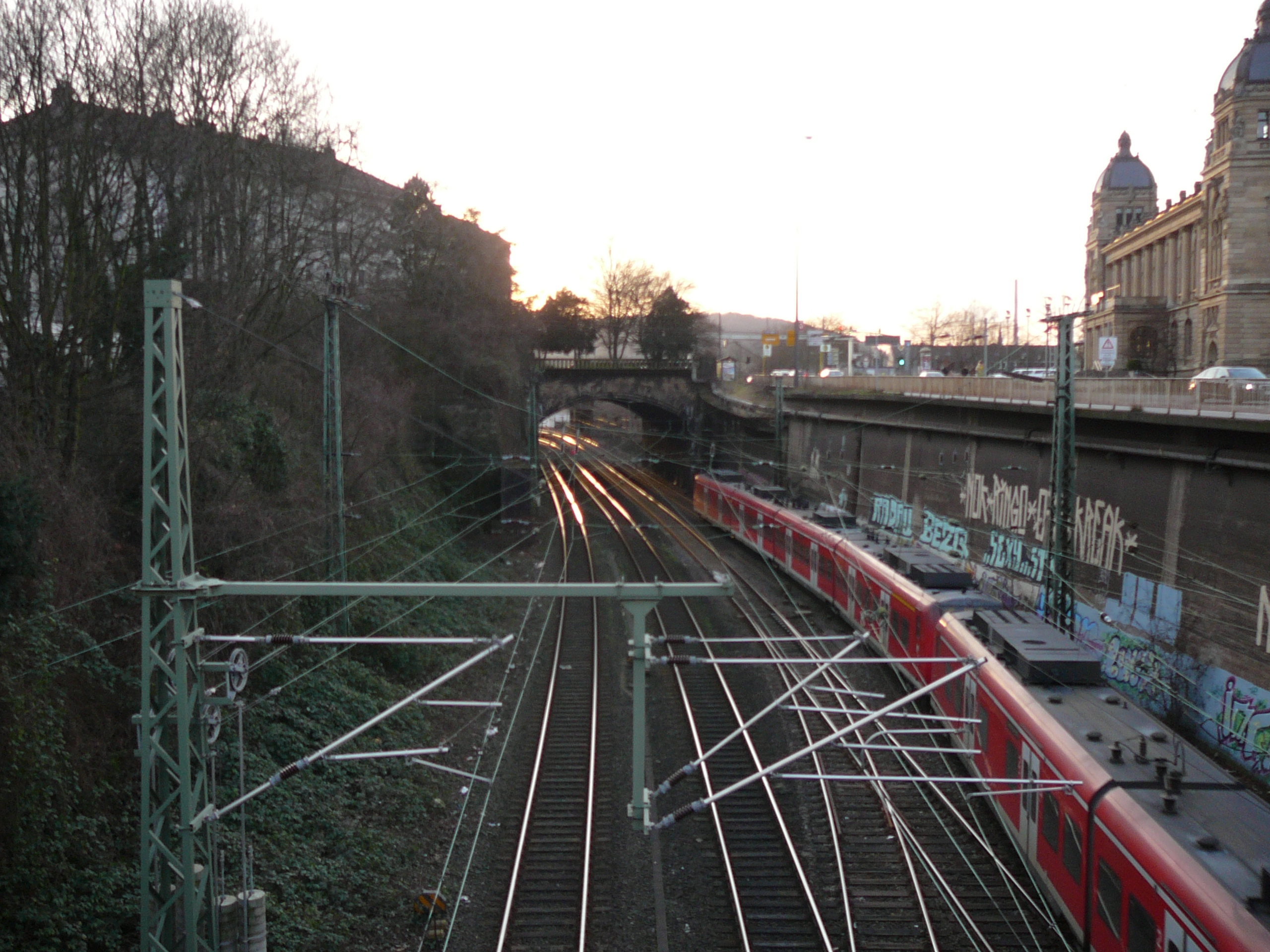
RB 48 in Wuppertal-Elberfeld

In December 2002, the Rhein-Wupper-Bahn replaced the North Rhine-Westphalian section of the former Rhein-Wupper-Express (RE 6), which ran between Koblenz and Wuppertal. The current RB 48 serves all stations served by Rhein-Wupper-Bahn on this section, with the exception of Hurth-Kalscheuren. The Rhein-Wupper-Express originally consisted of six n-carriages without a control car, pulled by class 110 locomotives. From 2001, following a three-part electric multiple units, consisting of two class 425 sets and one class 426 set.

The Rhein-Wupper-Bahn originally ran between Remagen and Wuppertal-Oberbarmen and was operated using coupled class 425 sets. In December 2003 it was shortened to terminate at Bonn-Mehlem because Rhineland-Palatinate would not provide sufficient funds for operations in its section.

After the motor coaches of the class 425 sets suffered massive brake problems in the autumn of 2003, in early September 2004 operations of the Rhein-Wupper-Bahn were changed as a precaution under the H'04 program to push-pull trains of five n-carriages hauled by class 110 locomotives. Modifications to the class 425 sets were completed three years later, in late 2007. Since then class 425 EMUs have run in double sets.

In December 2007, the Rhein-Wupper-Bahn was cut back from Wuppertal-Oberbarmen to Wuppertal Hauptbahnhof. This enabled the service to be run as Bonn–Wuppertal and Köln–Wuppertal cycles, saving a train set. One train runs late in the evening to Wuppertal-Oberbarmen, where it is parked overnight before returning early in the morning to Bonn.

In February 2013, a tender for operation of the Rhein-Wupper-Bahn from 2015 to 2030 was won by National Express. Service to Wuppertal-Oberbarmen were resumed in December 2015. During peak times, half-hourly services have been extended to Bonn.

== Prospects ==
There are plans to convert the Rhein-Wupper-Bahn service into an S-Bahn service. This would run at 20-minute intervals. This might run on a modified route between Opladen and Köln-Mülheim on the current freight line through Leverkusen-Morsbroich. This would provide better services to the suburbs of Dünnwald and Höhenhaus. It would be possible to run the service as line S 16 to Bonn, however, parts of the Left Rhine line would have to be increased to four tracks (the Cologne S-Bahn western ring). It is also possible that the new line S 16 would end in Cologne and line S 6 from Essen would be extended to Bonn.

== See also ==
- List of regional rail lines in North Rhine-Westphalia
- List of scheduled railway routes in Germany
