= Troisdorf–Mülheim-Speldorf railway =

Railway line in Germany

Mülheim-Speldorf–Troisdorf railway
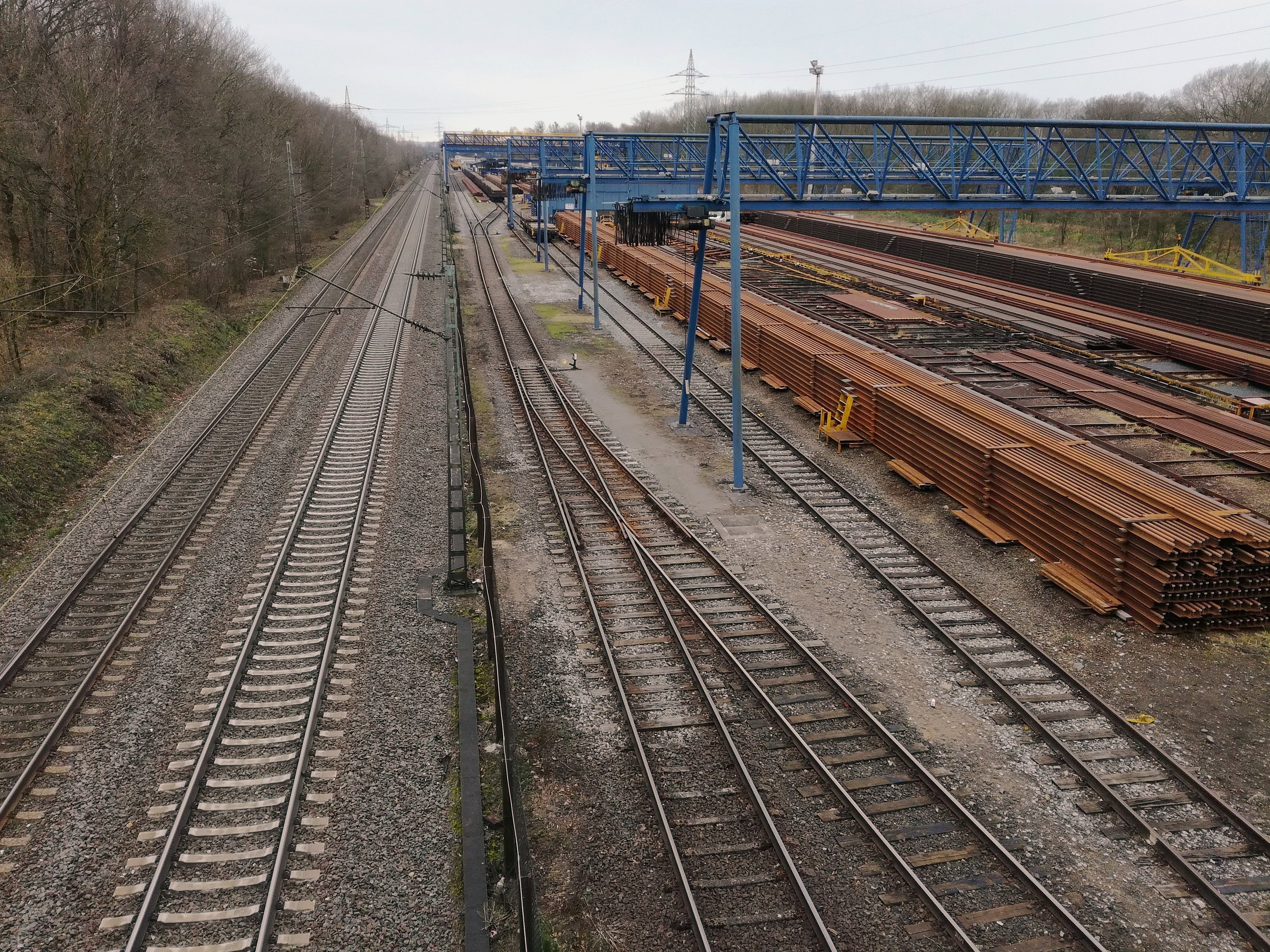

Overview
- Line number: 2324
- Locale: North Rhine-Westphalia, Germany

Technical
- Line length: 81.2 km (50.5 mi)

The Troisdorf–Mülheim-Speldorf railway is the main axis for freight between Cologne and the Ruhr area in Germany and the Netherlands. It connects the marshalling yards of Duisburg-Wedau (formerly important, now closed and demolished) and Gremberg (in Cologne).

== History ==
The track was opened on 18 November 1874 by the Rhenish Railway Company (German: Rheinischen Eisenbahn-Gesellschaft) to connect its Ruhr line with the Right Rhine line. It runs parallel, but a few kilometres to the east of the Cologne–Duisburg trunk line opened by the Cologne-Minden Railway Company (Cöln-Mindener Eisenbahn-Gesellschaft) thirty years earlier, from which it hoped to draw traffic. Since the line bypasses the centre of the towns, soon after the nationalisation of both companies in 1879/1880 passenger operations were closed on parts of it. Except on a few short sections the line is now used exclusively for freight.

== Passengers ==
After the Second World War passenger services ran only on the section from Mülheim-Speldorf to Düsseldorf-Rath (continuing to Düsseldorf Hauptbahnhof) and from Hilden to Opladen. Passenger services were discontinued between Duisburg-Wedau and Mülheim-Speldorf on 6 December 1971. This was followed on 23 September 1983 by the end of operations between Duisburg-Entenfang and Düsseldorf-Rath. Since then the only operation on the line is the Regionalbahn service, Der Wedauer (RB 37), from Duisburg Hauptbahnhof to Duisburg-Entenfang. Between Duisburg-Wedau and Lintorf, the line is also used by museum trains to access the Anger Valley Railway. Passenger services on the Opladen–Hilden section were abandoned on 23 September 1983. Passenger operations on the two sections were mainly operated in the postwar period with battery railcars of class 515, but local trains were also hauled by locomotives of classes 140 and 212 or composed of class 430 electric multiple units. A reactivation of passenger services has been discussed from time to time.

== Freight ==
The line was and is used by heavy freight traffic. North of Düsseldorf-Rath station there is a siding connecting to Vallourec & Mannesmann Tubes for the carriage of steel tubes by freight trains.
