= Wuppertal-Oberbarmen station =

Railway station in Wuppertal, Germany

Wuppertal Oberbarmen
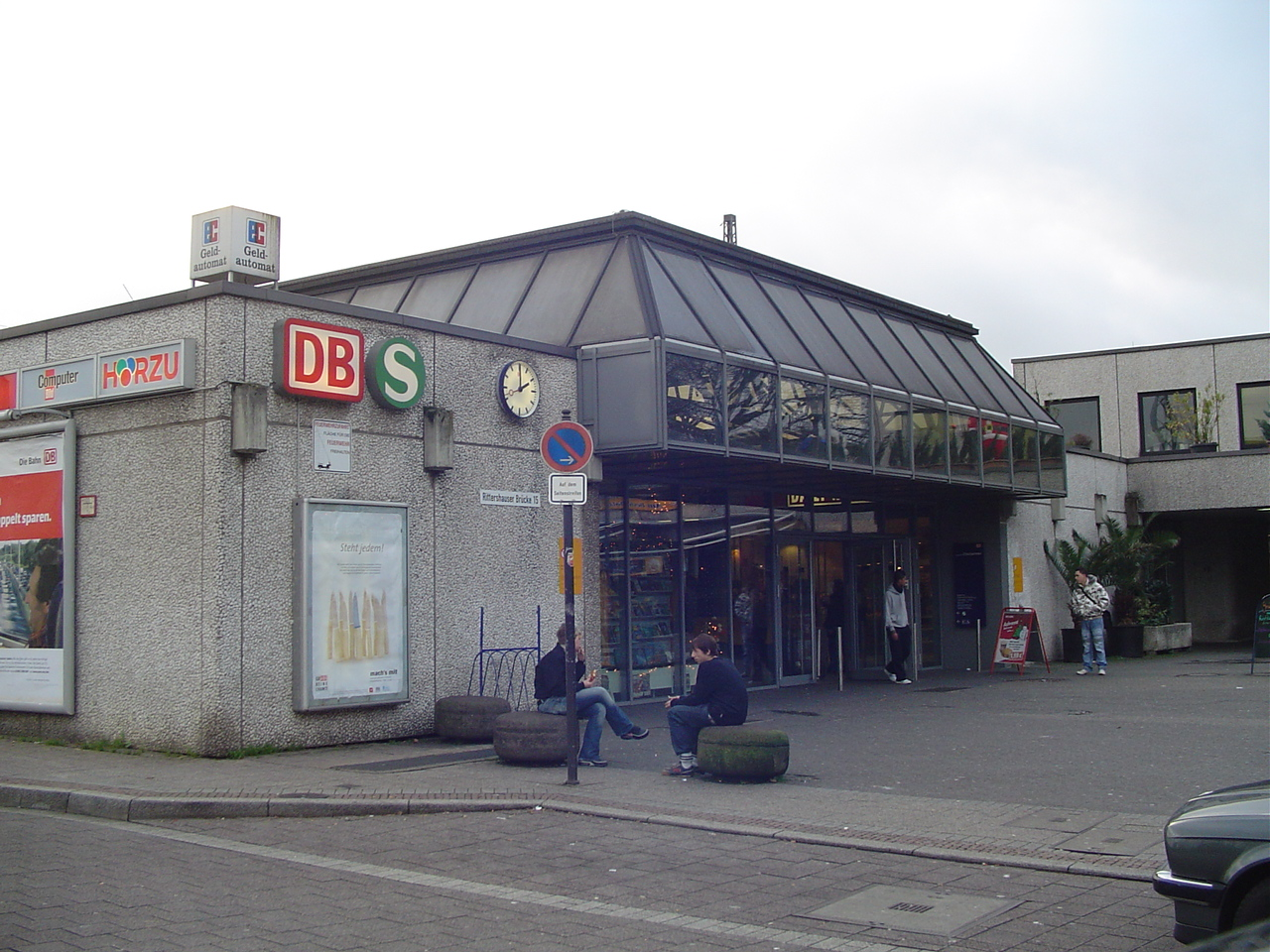
- Station entrance (2006)

General information
- Location: Rittershauser Brücke 15, Wuppertal, NRW; Germany
- Coordinates: 51°16′27″N 7°13′17″E
- Owner: DB Netz
- Operator: DB Station&Service
- Lines: Elberfeld–Dortmund (KBS 455); W-Oberbarmen–Solingen (KBS 458)
- Platforms: 3 island platforms
- Tracks: 6
- Train operators: Abellio Rail NRW; DB Regio NRW; Eurobahn; National Express Germany

Construction
- Accessible: Platforms 5, 6 only

Other information
- Station code: 6928
- DS100 code: KWO
- IBNR: 8006719
- Category: 3
- Fare zone: VRR: 660 and 664; VRS: 1660 (VRR transitional zone)
- Website: www.bahnhof.de

History
- Opened: 1847

Services
Preceding station	National Express Germany	Following station
Wuppertal-Barmen towards Aachen Hbf	RE 4 (Wupper-Express)	Schwelm towards Dortmund Hbf
Wuppertal Hbf towards Krefeld Hbf	RE 7 (Rhein-Münsterland-Express)	Schwelm towards Rheine
Wuppertal-Barmen towards Bonn-Mehlem	RB 48 (Rhein-Wupper-Bahn)	Terminus
Preceding station		Following station
Wuppertal-Barmen towards Venlo	RE 13	Schwelm towards Hamm (Westf) Hbf
Preceding station	Rhine-Ruhr S-Bahn	Following station
Wuppertal-Barmen towards Wuppertal Hbf	S7	Wuppertal-Ronsdorf towards Solingen Hbf
Wuppertal-Barmen towards Mönchengladbach Hbf	S8	Wuppertal-Langerfeld towards Hagen Hbf
Wuppertal-Barmen towards Haltern am See or Recklinghausen Hbf	S9	Wuppertal-Langerfeld towards Hagen Hbf
Preceding station	WSW mobil	Following station
Wupperfeld towards Vohwinkel Schwebebahn	Wuppertal Schwebebahn transfer at Oberbarmen	Terminus
Location
- Location within North Rhine-Westphalia Location within Germany Location within Europe

Wuppertal-Oberbarmen station is located in the city of Wuppertal in the German state of North Rhine-Westphalia. Historically, it served as a significant railway junction, connecting to four railway lines. Presently, the station is served by two remaining lines: the Dortmund–Wuppertal main line and the branch line to Solingen.

== History ==
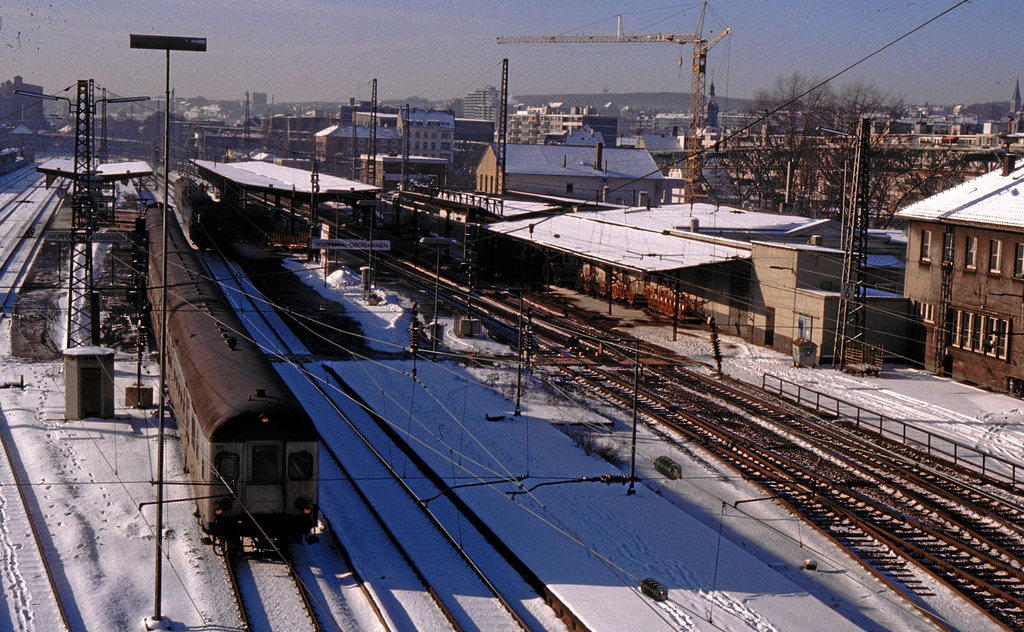
January 1982

The first station building was opened along with the Elberfeld–Dortmund line under the name of Barmen-Rittershausen by the Bergisch-Märkische Railway Company on 9 October 1847. It was subsequently renamed Wuppertal-Oberbarmen in 1930.

In 1910, the tracks and Rosenau street were relocated to accommodate the construction of a depot at Wuppertal-Langerfeld. The station area and the station building suffered significant damage during the Second World War. After a partial demolition carried out by Deutsche Bundesbahn in the post-war period, the station was reconstructed in the 1980s during the establishment of S-Bahn line S8. Today there is a square-shaped commercial building with a newsagent, a bakery shop and a McDonald's branch.

In its prime, Wuppertal-Oberbarmen boasted a triangular junction that interconnected the Elberfeld–Dortmund main line with the Opladen and Solingen lines, as well as a connection to the Düsseldorf-Derendorf–Dortmund Süd railway and the Wuppertal-Wichlinghausen–Hattingen line.

Furthermore, Wuppertal-Oberbarmen held significant importance as a freight terminal for an extended period. Nevertheless, the last freight tracks were dismantled in 2006, and the area was repurposed to accommodate a DIY store.

== Current operations ==
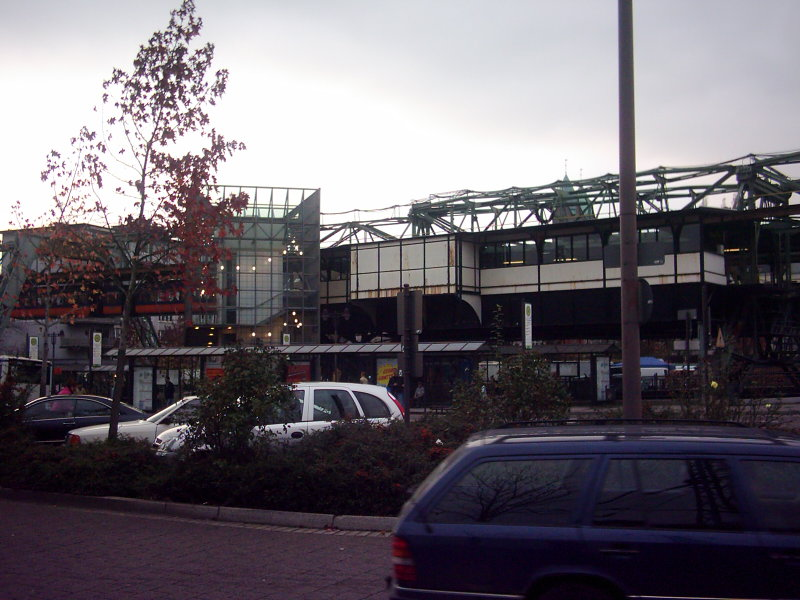
Oberbarmen Schwebebahn terminus at Wuppertal-Oberbarmen station

Long-distance passenger trains pass through Wuppertal-Oberbarmen without stopping. However, all regional trains running through Wuppertal stop. The Wupper-Express (RE 4), the Rhein-Münsterland-Express (RE 7) and the Maas-Wupper-Express (RE 13) stop at the station at hourly intervals. Services on S-Bahn lines S8 to/from Mönchengladbach and S 7 to/from Remscheid) stop every twenty minutes on the local platforms. Services on line S 9 and one in three services on line S8 run to/from Hagen every 60 minutes.

Deutsche Bahn classifies the station as category 3.

Wuppertal-Oberbarmen is also a major connecting point between the railway and other public transport services. The Schwebebahn has its eastern terminus here, and there is a bus station, which is served by many of the lines of Wuppertaler Stadtwerke (Wuppertal's operator of public utilities and transport) and Verkehrsgesellschaft Ennepe-Ruhr (the transport company of Ennepe-Ruhr).

== Platforms ==
Today, there are three platforms with a total of six tracks. Regional trains stop on tracks 2 and 3; they are also used for non-stop operations by long-distance trains. Services on S-Bahn lines S 7, S 8 and S 9 stop on tracks 5 and 6. The other platform tracks are not barrier-free for the disabled.

== Interchanges ==
The following services stop at the station.

Line	Line name	Route	Service interval	Platform track
RE 4	Wupper-Express	Aachen – Mönchengladbach – Düsseldorf – Wuppertal – Hagen – Dortmund	hourly	2/3
RE 7	Rhein-Münsterland-Express	Krefeld – Neuss – Cologne – Solingen – Wuppertal – Hagen – Hamm – Münster – Rheine	hourly	2/3
RE 13	Maas-Wupper-Express	Venlo – Viersen – Mönchengladbach – Düsseldorf – Wuppertal – Hagen – Hamm	hourly	2/3
RB 48	Rhein-Wupper-Bahn	Bonn-Mehlem – Bonn – Cologne – Solingen – Wuppertal-Vohwinkel – Wuppertal – Wuppertal-Oberbarmen	30 minutes	
S7	Rhine-Ruhr S-Bahn	Solingen – Remscheid – Wuppertal	20 minutes	5/6
S8	Rhine-Ruhr S-Bahn	Hagen – Gevelsberg – Wuppertal – Düsseldorf – Neuss – Mönchengladbach	20 minutes (to Mönchengladbach), 60 minutes (to Hagen)	5/6
S9	Rhine-Ruhr S-Bahn	Hagen – Gevelsberg – Schwelm - Wuppertal – Velbert - Essen – Bottrop - Gladbeck - Recklinghausen	60 minutes	5/6
