= Bonn-Mehlem station =

Railway station in Bonn, Germany

Bonn Mehlem
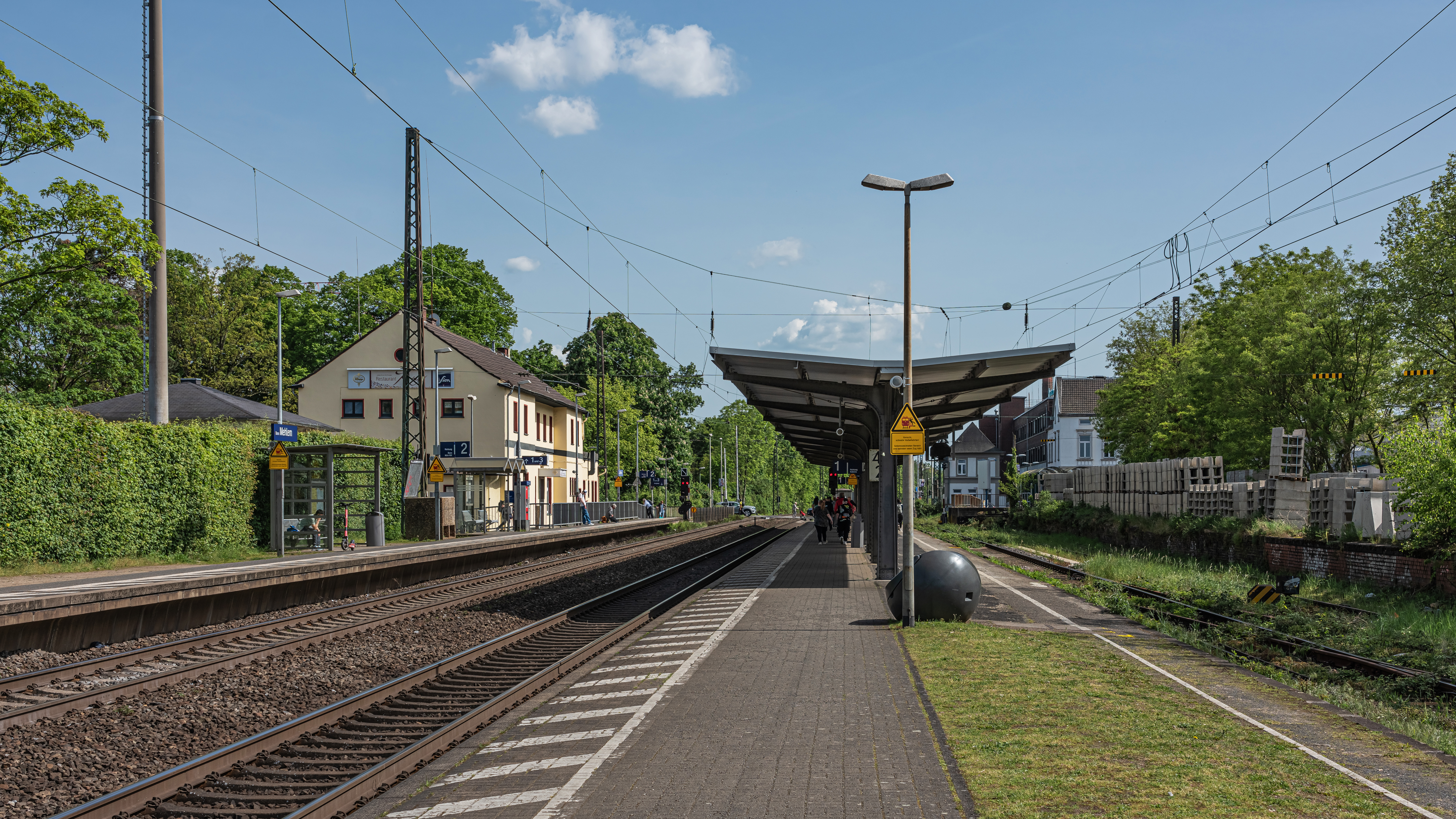

General information
- Location: Mainzer Str. 24, Bonn, NRW; Germany
- Coordinates: 50°40′11″N 7°10′51″E
- Lines: West Rhine Railway (KBS 470)
- Platforms: 2
- Tracks: 3

Construction
- Accessible: Platform 2 only

Other information
- Station code: 0771
- DS100 code: KBM
- IBNR: 8001085
- Category: 4
- Fare zone: VRS: 2600
- Website: www.bahnhof.de

History
- Opened: 15 October 1855

Services
Preceding station	DB Regio NRW	Following station
Oberwinter towards Ahrbrück	RB 30	Bonn-Bad Godesberg towards Bonn Hbf
Preceding station	National Express Germany	Following station
Terminus	RB 48 (Rhein-Wupper-Bahn)	Bonn-Bad Godesberg towards Wuppertal-Oberbarmen
Preceding station	Trans Regio	Following station
Rolandseck towards Mainz Hbf	RB 26	Bonn-Bad Godesberg towards Köln Messe/Deutz
Location
- Location within North Rhine-Westphalia

Bonn-Mehlem station is a through station in the Bonn district of Lannesdorf in the German state of North Rhine-Westphalia. It has three platform tracks and is located on the Left Rhine line south of Bonn Hauptbahnhof. The station also is served by buses and has parking spaces. It is classified by Deutsche Bahn as a category 4 station.

== History ==
On 21 January 1856, the section of the Left Rhine line between Bonn and Rolandseck was opened to traffic. The station in the then independent city of Mehlem was opened at this time. Due to the incorporation of Bad Godesberg in the city of Bonn, Mehlem station was renamed Bonn Mehlem in 1971. Mehlem had been part of Bad Godesberg since 1935.

A slightly recessed platform in the station served from 1949 as the location for travel and receptions of the American High Commissioner John J. McCloy and his successors to 1955 and the subsequent U.S. ambassadors. A class VT 06 railbus was continuously stationed here for this service. After 1963, the permanent stationing of trains at Bonn-Mehlem station for the American Embassy was terminated for financial reasons, but when required railbuses of classes VT 08-8 and VT 33.8 came from their base in Heidelberg, then the most important base for American troops in Germany. Once a year, possibly more often, a special train carried the U.S. ambassador via the Brunswick–Magdeburg railway through Helmstedt on the established transit route to Berlin-Lichterfelde West. The last such journey of an ambassador at Bonn-Mehlem took place on 18/19 December 1990 during the tenure of Vernon A. Walters. German reunification ended the role of Bonn-Mehlem station as a station of the American Embassy.

== Services ==
The Bonn-Mehlem has three platform tracks, each over 200 metres in length. The edge of platform 2 is 76 cm high and is accessible from the street. Platform tracks 1 and 3 are on an island platform, which does not have lift access, and have a height of 38 cm, appropriate for long-distance, although there are no longer any long-distance services at the station. The station is served by the following three lines:

Line	Line name	Route	Frequency	Operator
RB 26	MittelrheinBahn	Köln Messe/Deutz – Cologne– Bonn – Bonn-Mehlem – Remagen – Andernach – Koblenz-Stadtmitte - Koblenz - Mainz	1x per hour	trans regio
RB 30	Rhein-Ahr-Bahn	Bonn – Bonn-Mehlem – Remagen – Bad Neuenahr – Ahrbrück	1x per hour	DB Regio NRW
RB 48	Rhein-Wupper-Bahn	Wuppertal-Oberbarmen – Wuppertal – Cologne – Bonn – Bonn-Mehlem	1x per hour	National Express

It is served by four bus routes, operated by SWB Bus und Bahn: 613 (at 10- to 20-minute intervals), 614 (20), 619 (20) and 852 (6 times a day). It is also served by two bus routes operated by Regionalverkehr Köln (both at 60-minute intervals): 856 and 857.
