= National Express Germany =

German public transport enterprise

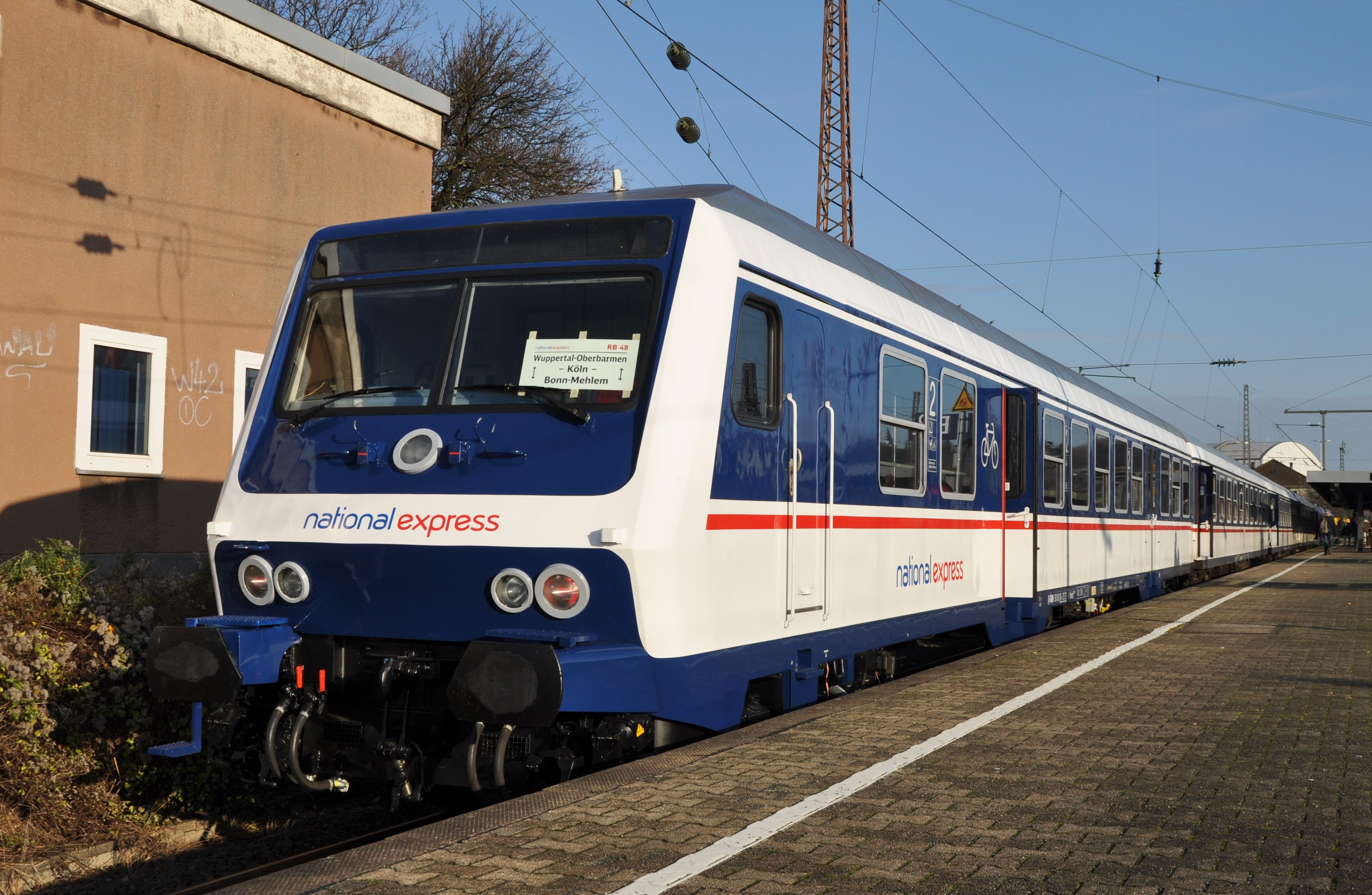
- Industry: Rail transport
- Founded: 13 December 2015
- Headquarters: Cologne, Germany
- Owner: Mobico Group
- Website: www.nationalexpress.de

National Express Germany is a railway operator in Germany. It is a wholly owned subsidiary of the British transport company Mobico Group.

National Express gained its first regional rail contracts in February 2013 and commenced operations on 13 December 2015. While the Bayerische Eisenbahngesellschaft awarded the company a separate contract to operate the Nuremberg S-Bahn system in January 2015, this decision was strongly opposed by the German national train operator Deutsche Bahn (DB), and National Express Germany opted to withdraw its bid in October 2016 due to the legal challenge's disruption. Nevertheless, the company was awarded parts two and three of the Rhein-Ruhr-Express in June 2015, which National Express Germany commenced between June 2019 and December 2020.

During January 2022, National Express was awarded an emergency contract to replace Abellio GmbH in the operation of services in North Rhine-Westphalia; a long-term contract covering the same services followed one year later.

== History ==
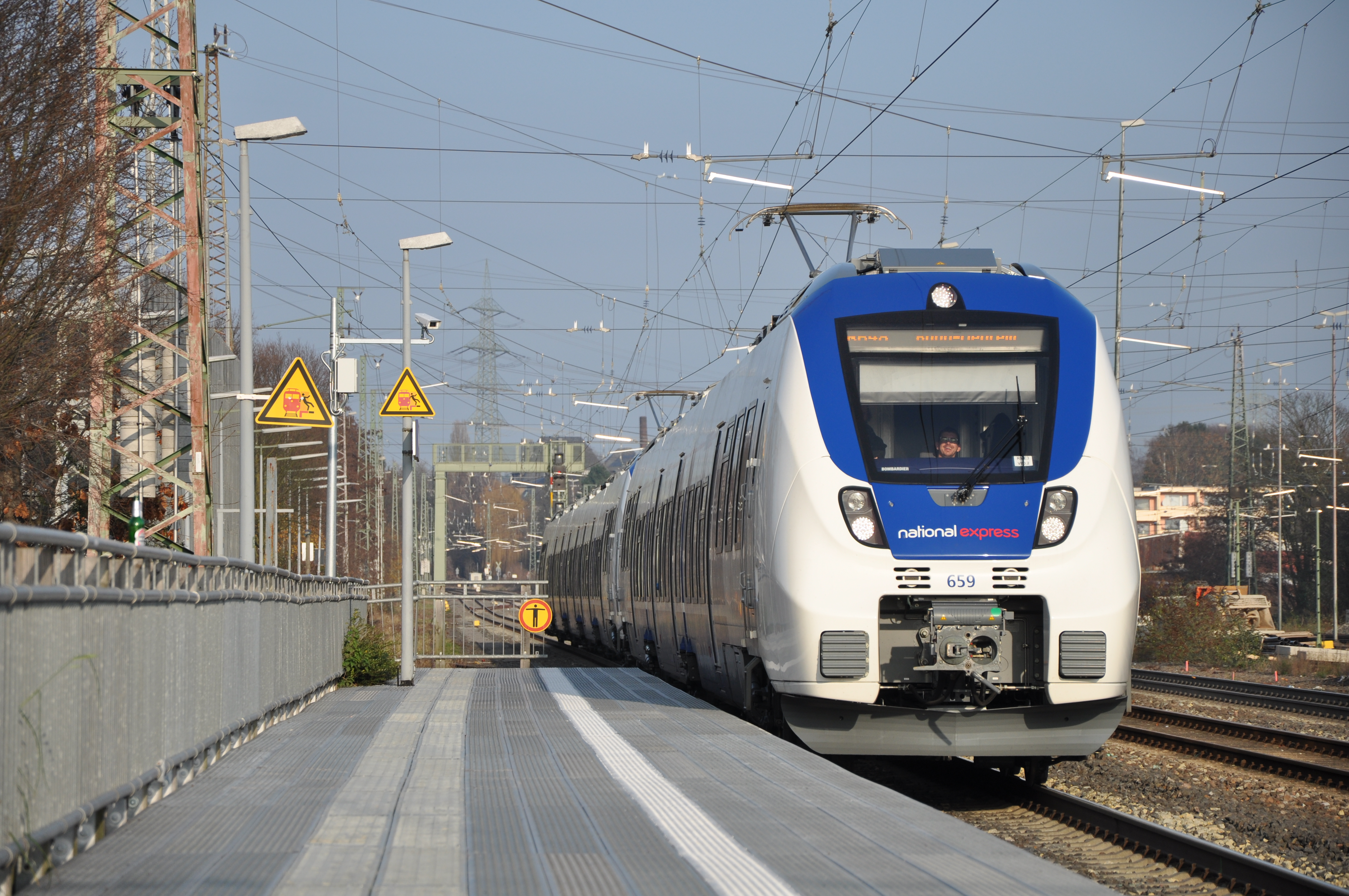
Bombardier Talent 2 at Solingen in December 2015

In February 2013, National Express was awarded a pair of regional rail contracts in Germany by the Verkehrsverbund Rhein-Ruhr, Zweckverband Nahverkehr Rheinland and Zweckverband Nahverkehr Westfalen-Lippe authorities. The company has anticipated that around 18 million passengers shall use the associated services annually, which would cumulatively generate around €1.6 billion of revenue. Services under these contracts commenced on 13 December 2015.

In January 2015, the Bayerische Eisenbahngesellschaft awarded National Express a separate contract to operate the Nuremberg S-Bahn system. It was set to commence in December 2018, taking over from the incumbent operator, the German state owned operator DB Regio, and would have been the first Deutsche Bahn (DB) S-Bahn network to be taken over by a private operator. However, DB unsuccessfully appealed the award by questioning the financial stability of National Express Germany. In October 2016, National Express withdrew its bid, stating that an inability to order new rolling stock during the protracted legal process instituted by DB would make its bid unviable. In response to gains by competing companies, DB reportedly launched efforts to reduce costs and sought to retain as much of its profitable regional services as possible.

In June 2015, National Express was awarded parts two and three of the Rhein-Ruhr-Express, which commenced in stages between June 2019 and December 2020.

During January 2022, following the financial difficulties of Abellio GmbH, National Express was awarded an emergency contract to operate services in North Rhine-Westphalia (Rhein-Express (RE/RRX 1) Aachen-Hamm and Rhein-Hellweg-Express (RE11) Düsseldorf-Kassel) for a two-year period starting in February 2022. In January 2023, the company was issued with a longer-term contract to operate the RE1 and RE11 Rhein-Ruhr-Express lines through to 2033. This contract, valued at €1 billion, made National Express the second largest rail transport company operating in the region, covering an anticipated 20 million train kilometres in 2023.

== Services ==
| Line | Network | tph | Route | Rolling Stock | Contract commences | Contract finishes |
|---|---|---|---|---|---|---|
| RE 1 (RRX) | NRW-Express | 1 | Aachen – Köln – Düsseldorf – Duisburg – Essen – Dortmund – Hamm | Siemens Desiro HC EMUs | February 2022 | December 2030 |
| RE 4 | Wupper-Express | 1 | Aachen – Mönchengladbach – Düsseldorf – Hagen – Dortmund | Siemens Desiro HC EMUs | December 2020 | December 2033 |
| RE 5 (RRX) | Rhein-Express | 1 | Koblenz – Köln – Düsseldorf – Duisburg – Oberhausen – Wesel | Siemens Desiro HC EMUs | June 2019 | December 2033 |
| RE 6 (RRX) | Westfalen-Express | 1 | Köln/Bonn Flughafen – Köln – Düsseldorf – Duisburg – Essen – Hamm – Minden | Siemens Desiro HC EMUs | December 2019 | December 2033 |
| RE 7 | Rhein-Münsterland-Express | 1 | Krefeld – Neuss – Köln – Solingen – Wuppertal – Hagen – Hamm – Münster – Rheine | Bombardier Talent 2 EMUs | December 2015 | December 2030 |
| RE 11 (RRX) | Rhein-Hellweg-Express | 1 | Kassel-Wilhelmshöhe – Paderborn Hbf – Hamm ~~– Dortmund – Essen – Duisburg – Düsseldorf~~ (from 2 August 2023 services only operate between Kassel and Hamm until further notice, with the exception of some select services between Hamm and Düsseldorf) | Siemens Desiro HC EMUs | February 2022 | December 2030 |
| RB 48 | Rhein-Wupper-Bahn | 2 | Bonn-Mehlem – Bonn – Köln – Solingen – Wuppertal – Wuppertal-Oberbarmen | Bombardier Talent 2 EMUs | December 2015 | December 2030 |

== Rolling stock ==
The initial rolling stock operated by National Express was a fleet of 35 Bombardier Talent 2 electric multiple-units (EMUs) ordered in June 2013. Configured either as three-car and five-car sets, these trains can reach speeds of up to 100 mph and have been furnished with interiors designed for accessibility and comfort, providing both first and standard-class seating along with multi-purpose areas to accommodate prams, wheelchairs and bikes. These were sold back to the Rhine-Ruhr Transport Association (VRR) and Westphalia-Lippe Local Transport (NWL) and leased back to National Express for the duration of the contract.

The Rhein-Ruhr-Express services are operated by Siemens Desiro HC double-decker EMUs. Based and serviced at the RRX depot in Dortmund, these trains provide 800 seats (200 seats greater than available aboard the previous generation of rolling stock) along with platform-level doors, air conditioning throughout, power outlets at the seats, and free onboard Wi-Fi.

For greater convenience and ease of operation, the Desiro HC series is outfitted with passenger information systems and a train diagnostics system along with digital networking.
