= Bonn-Bad Godesberg station =

Railway station in Germany

Bonn Bad Godesberg
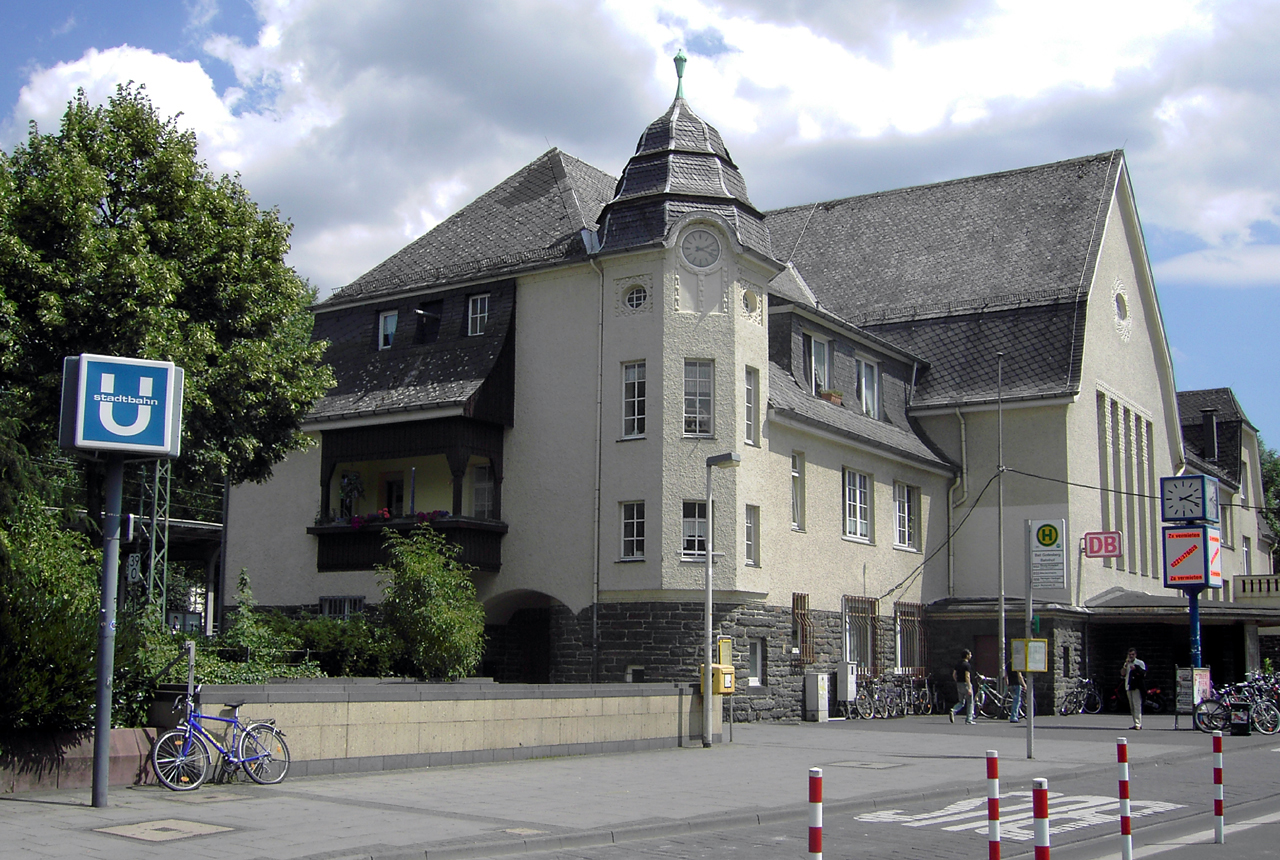
- Entrance building and Bonn Stadtbahn entrance

General information
- Location: Moltkestr. 43, Bonn, NRW; Germany
- Coordinates: 50°41′1.30″N 7°9′33.3″E
- Line: West Rhine Railway
- Platforms: 4

Construction
- Accessible: Yes
- Architectural style: Neo-Renaissance

Other information
- Station code: 768
- DS100 code: KBBG
- IBNR: 8001082
- Category: 4
- Fare zone: VRS: 2600
- Website: www.bahnhof.de

History
- Opened: 15 October 1855

Services
Preceding station	DB Regio NRW	Following station
Bonn-Mehlem towards Ahrbrück	RB 30	Bonn UN Campus towards Bonn Hbf
Preceding station	National Express Germany	Following station
Oberwinter towards Koblenz Hbf	RE 5 (Rhein-Express)	Bonn UN Campus towards Wesel
Bonn-Mehlem Terminus	RB 48 (Rhein-Wupper-Bahn)	Bonn UN Campus towards Wuppertal-Oberbarmen
Preceding station	Trans Regio	Following station
Bonn-Mehlem towards Mainz Hbf	RB 26	Bonn UN Campus towards Köln Messe/Deutz
Preceding station	Bonn Stadtbahn	Following station
Plittersdorfer Straße towards Niehl Sebastianstraße	Line 16	Bad Godesberg Stadthalle Terminus
Plittersdorfer Straße towards Tannenbusch Mitte	Line 63	Bad Godesberg Stadthalle Terminus
Plittersdorfer Straße towards Siegburg/Bonn	Line 67	Bad Godesberg Stadthalle Terminus
Location
- Location within North Rhine-Westphalia

Bonn-Bad Godesberg station is on the Left Rhine line (German: Linke Rheinstrecke) in the Bonn district of Bad Godesberg in the German state of North Rhine-Westphalia.

It is a four-track through station, which does not have a “home” platform attached to the station building. Instead, it has two through and overtaking tracks on two island platforms, with one platform numbered 1 and 4 and the other 2 and 3, which is unusual in Germany, but occurs several times on the Left Rhine line.

== History ==
The station was inaugurated on 15 October 1855 as part of the extension of the Left Rhine line from Bonn to Rolandseck station. The need for Godesberg station, which was then in open fields, was said to stem from the fact that Godesberg was the location of the summer homes of many shareholders of the Bonn–Cologne Railway Company and the president of the Rhenish Railway Company. For years the shareholders had a table in the station buffet and insisted on almost all trains stopping in Godesberg.

From the turn of the century Godesberg grew rapidly and established itself as a resort and retirement home for retired Prussians, increasing the importance of the station. The old neoclassical entrance hall was too small and in 1908 it was replaced by the Art Nouveau building that still exists, with even its interior largely preserved; this is located just south of the old station. At the same time, the route of the railway line was raised by about a metre and subways were built under the line for the streets of Friedrichallee, Rheinallee and Bürgerstraße. As Godesberg's name was changed to Bad Godesberg in 1925, the name of the station was also similarly changed. After the city was incorporated was to Bonn in 1969, the station was again renamed in the summer 1971 timetable and received its present name of Bonn-Bad Godesberg. Since the mid-1980s express trains have not served Bonn-Bad Godesberg, except for a period in the early 1990s, when at first InterCity Night services stopped at Bad Godesberg and later Intercity-Express trains on the Bonn–Berlin route started and ended in Bad Godesberg.

== Operations ==
Platform track 1 is served by regular regional trains to the south (Koblenz and on to Mainz). Track 2 is used by regional trains to the north (Bonn and on to Cologne). Tracks 3 and 4 are only used as sidings and as passing tracks.

== Train services ==
Today the station is served by Regional-Express and Regionalbahn services and is served by four routes each hour, so that to and from Bonn Hauptbahnhof there are services at approximately 15-minute intervals. The station is above a Deutsche Bahn ticket office and some small shops. The main station building is now occupied by the Klangstation, a concert, theatre and lecture hall.

The station is served by the following services:

- Regional services RE 5 Rhein-Express Emmerich - Oberhausen - Duisburg - Düsseldorf - Cologne - Bonn - Andernach - Koblenz
- Local services RB 26 MittelrheinBahn Cologne - Bonn - Remagen - Andernach - Koblenz - Bingen - Mainz
- Local services RB 30 Rhein-Ahr-Bahn Bonn - Remagen - Bad Neuenahr - Dernau - Ahrbrück
- Local services RB 48 Rhein-Wupper-Bahn Wuppertal-Oberbarmen - Wuppertal - Solingen - Cologne - Bonn - Bonn-Mehlem

=== Stadtbahn services ===
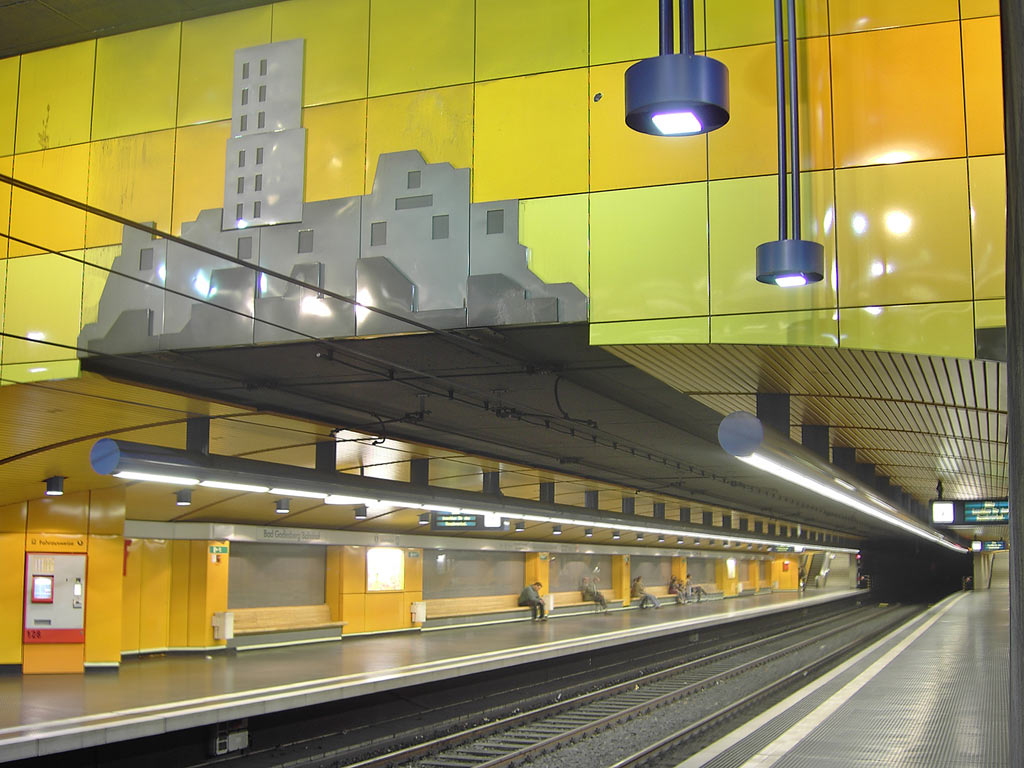
Underground station

Since 1994, a station of the Bonn Stadtbahn has been located under the Bad Godesberg railway station:

- : Köln-Niehl-Sebastianstraße - Köln Hauptbahnhof - Rheinuferbahn - Bonn Hauptbahnhof - Stammstrecke - Bad Godesberg
- : Tannenbusch – Rheinuferbahn – Bonn Hauptbahnhof – Stammstrecke – Bad Godesberg
- : Siegburg – Siegburg/Bonn – Bonn Hauptbahnhof – Stammstrecke – Bad Godesberg

== Plans ==
Between 2014 and 2016, an extensive modernisation and renovation of the station is to be carried out, including the complete renovation of the pedestrian underpass and the installation of lifts on the platforms.
