= Bonn–Cologne Railway Company =

Transport company

The Bonn–Cologne Railway Company (German: Bonn-Cölner Eisenbahn-Gesellschaft, BCE) was a former German Railway company, founded in July 1837 in Bonn and granted a concession on 6 July 1840 to build and operate a railway line between Bonn and Cologne.

== History ==
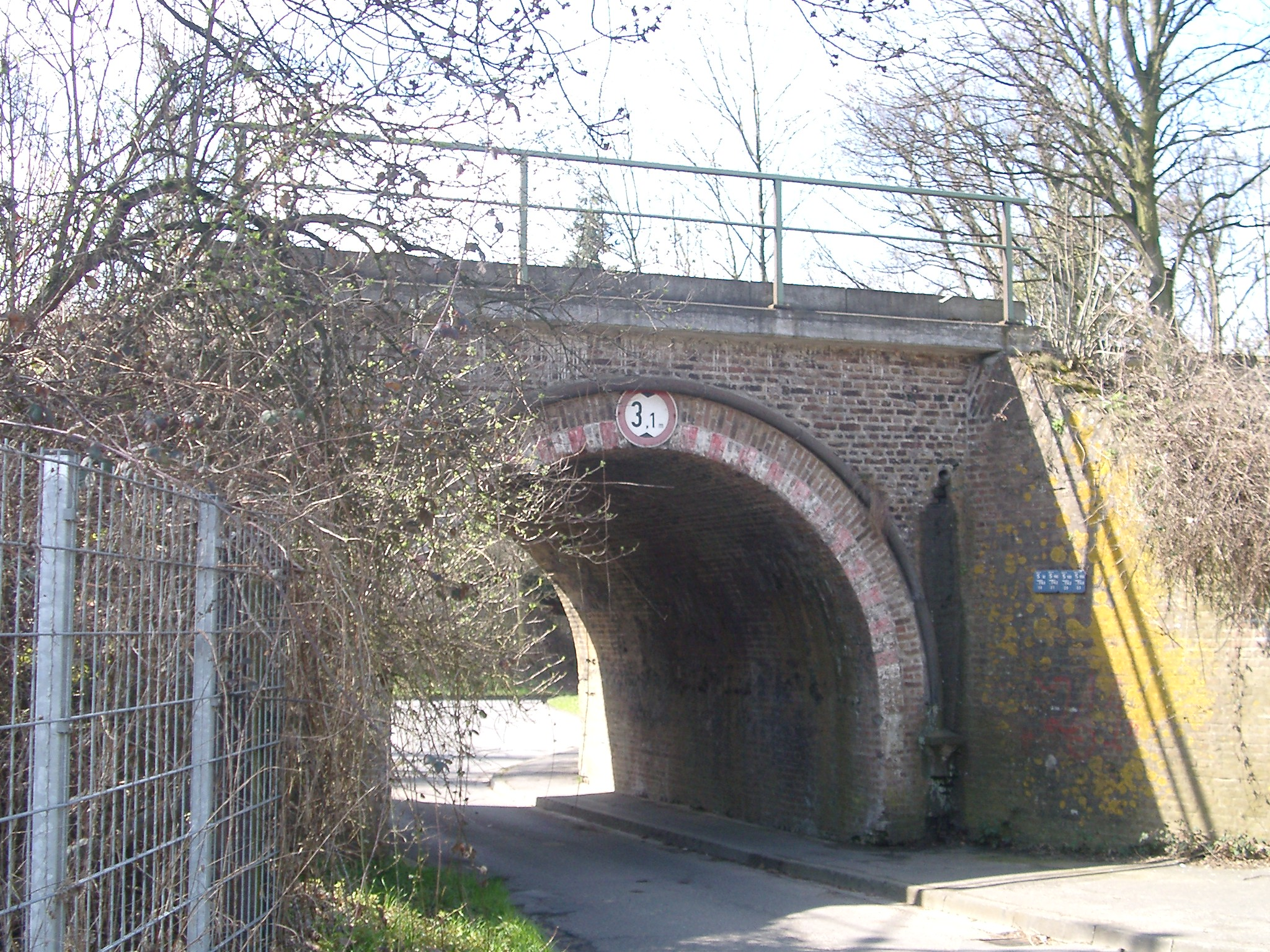
Old underpass near Roisdorf

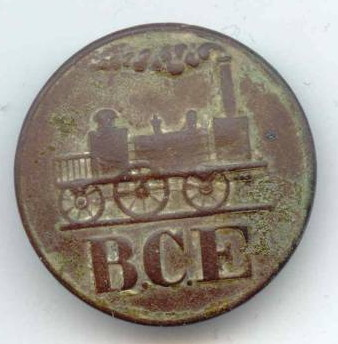
Button from BCE staff uniform

Two options were examined for the route: a direct line along the course of the Rhine would have been cheaper. This would have passed through a sparsely populated area, which would have produced few passengers. Half a century later this route was used by the Rhine Bank Railway (Rheinuferbahn) built by another Cologne-Bonn railway (Köln-Bonner Eisenbahnen)—now line 16 of the Cologne and Bonn Stadtbahns.

Another option was built, a 29-km-long line, later part of the West Rhine line (Linke Rheinstrecke). It runs in a wide arc through Roisdorf, Sechtem, Brühl and Kalscheuren to St. Pantaleon station in Cologne. This terminal station was built immediately after passing through the Pantaleon gate of the medieval Wall.

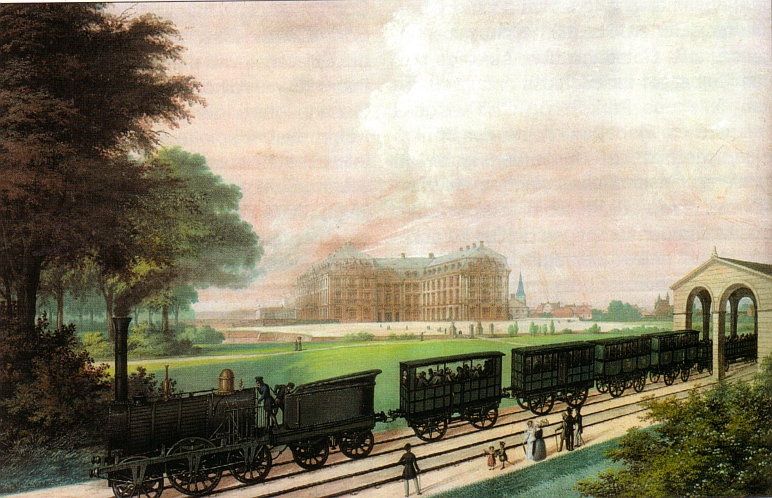
Opening of the Cologne–Bonn railway at Augustusburg palace, Brühl in 1844

The site for Bonn station was strongly debated. The location in Poppelsdorfer Allee was finally selected, because it was easier to extend the line from there to the south.

The first earthworks were built in March 1842. The line was opened on 15 February 1844 after a grand ceremony of inauguration on 13 February. From the summer of 1844 six daily pairs of trains ran. The first four locomotives came from Manchester.

=== Extension to Rolandseck ===
In 1844, the BCE increased its capital to fund an extension to Koblenz and the shares were oversubscribed fourfold. Construction of the new route, however, was delayed partly because Bonn University protested to the Prussian king Frederick William IV against the fragmentation of Poppelsdorfer Allee (avenue) on its land. The king finally commissioned the landscape architect Peter Joseph Lenné to design of the intersection of the railway and Poppelsdorfer Allee.

The BCE was authorised on 4 August 1854 to extend its line at least to Rolandseck. This was an important part of its success, as it was possible for travellers to change conveniently from train to steamship at the station. In addition the constriction of the Rhine Valley there made the construction of competing lines on the western side of the Rhine impossible. On 18 October 1855 the line was completed via Bad Godesberg and Mehlem to Rolandswerth and on 21 January 1856 the entire 14 km long extension to Rolandseck was opened.

=== Takeover of the company ===
On 1 January 1857, the Bonn–Cologne Railway Company was acquired by the Rhenish Railway Company for 1.05 million Prussian thalers.

Forty years later with the Köln-Bonner Eisenbahnen (KBE) was established with a similar name (but with more modern spelling), but it was not related to the BCE.
