= United Nations station =

United Nations station or UN station may refer to:

- Bonn UN Campus station, a railway station in North Rhine-Westphalia, Germany
- United Nations station (LIRR), a temporary name for the Mets–Willets Point commuter rail station in New York, United States
- United Nations station (LRT), a light rail transit station in Manila, Philippines
- Civic Center/UN Plaza station, a rapid transit station in San Francisco, California, United States
