= Sechtem station =

Railway station in Germany

Bornheim-Sechtem
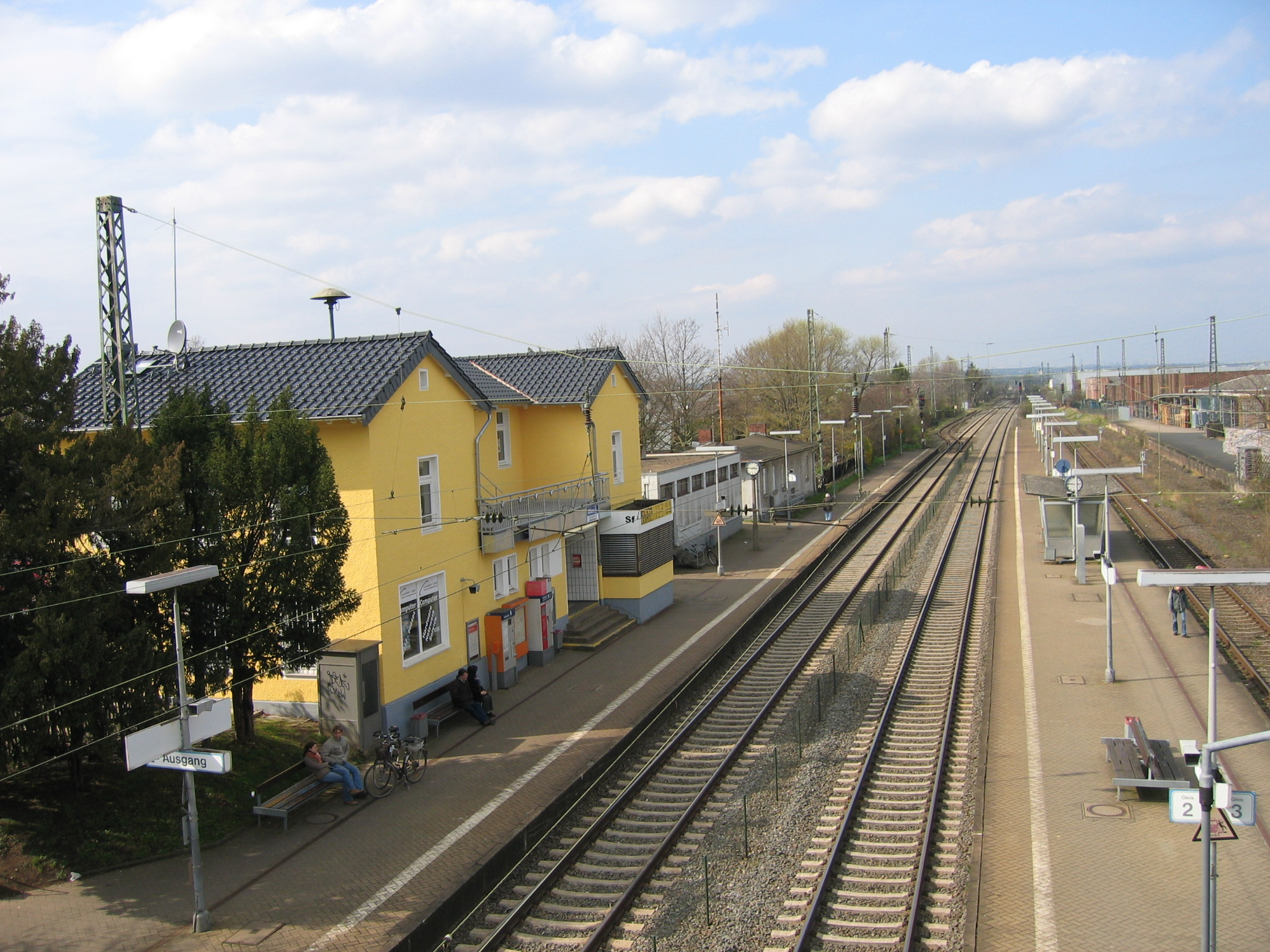
- 2007

General information
- Location: Bornheim, NRW; Germany
- Coordinates: 50°47′45″N 6°57′26″E
- Owner: DB Netz
- Operator: DB Station&Service
- Lines: West Rhine Railway (KBS 470)
- Platforms: 3

Construction
- Accessible: Yes

Other information
- Station code: 5773
- DS100 code: KSEC
- IBNR: 8005499
- Category: 4
- Fare zone: VRS: 2531
- Website: www.bahnhof.de

History
- Opened: 1 March 1844

Services
Preceding station	National Express Germany	Following station
Roisdorf towards Bonn-Mehlem	RB 48 (Rhein-Wupper-Bahn)	Brühl towards Wuppertal-Oberbarmen
Preceding station	Trans Regio	Following station
Roisdorf towards Mainz Hbf	RB 26	Brühl towards Köln Messe/Deutz
Location
- Location within North Rhine-Westphalia

Sechtem station is a through station in the district of Sechtem of the town of Bornheim in the German state of North Rhine-Westphalia.

Sechtem station was opened on 1 March 1844 on the Left Rhine line, which was opened between Cologne and Bonn by the Bonn–Cologne Railway Company on 15 February 1844. It was completely modernised and rebuilt to be barrier-free in 2010. Since then, it has had an underpass, a lift, and elevated platforms, providing barrier-free boarding and alighting of trains.

The station has three platform tracks and it is classified by Deutsche Bahn as a category 5 station.

== Rail services ==
The station is served by the following two lines:

Line	Line name	Route	Frequency	Operator
RB 26	MittelrheinBahn	Köln Messe/Deutz – Cologne – Sechtem – Bonn – Remagen – Andernach – Koblenz-Stadtmitte – Koblenz - (Mainz)	1x per hour	trans regio
RB 48	Rhein-Wupper-Bahn	Wuppertal-Oberbarmen – Wuppertal – Cologne – Sechtem – Bonn – Bonn-Mehlem	1x per hour	DB Regio NRW

It is also served by bus route 818, operated by Regionalverkehr Köln at 60-minute intervals.
