= Brühl station =

Railway station in Brühl, Germany

Brühl
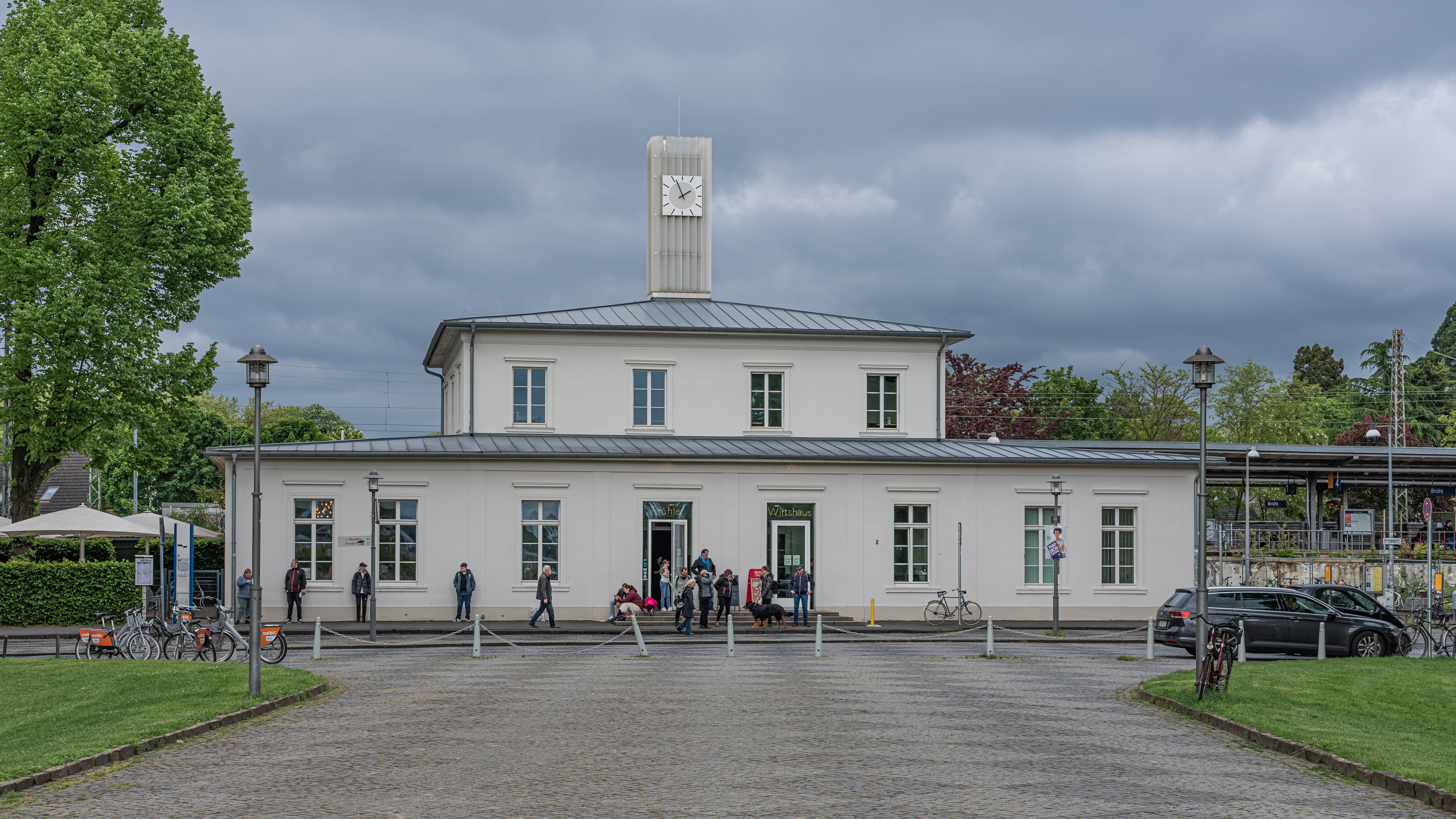
- Entrance building

General information
- Location: Max-Ernst-Allee 2, NRW; Germany
- Coordinates: 50°49′45″N 6°54′44″E
- Owner: DB Netz
- Operator: DB Station&Service
- Line: West Rhine Railway
- Platforms: 3

Construction
- Accessible: No
- Architect: Johann-Peter Weyer

Other information
- Station code: 917
- DS100 code: KBR
- IBNR: 8001215
- Category: 4
- Fare zone: VRS: 2840
- Website: www.bahnhof.de

History
- Opened: 15 February 1844

Services
| Preceding station | National Express Germany | Following station |
|---|---|---|
| Bonn Hbf towards Koblenz Hbf | RE 5 (Rhein-Express) | Köln Süd towards Wesel |
| Sechtem towards Bonn-Mehlem | RB 48 (Rhein-Wupper-Bahn) | Hürth-Kalscheuren towards Wuppertal-Oberbarmen |
| Preceding station | Trans Regio | Following station |
| Sechtem towards Mainz Hbf | RB 26 | Hürth-Kalscheuren towards Köln Messe/Deutz |
Location
- Location within North Rhine-Westphalia

Brühl station is a railway station in the city of Brühl in the German state of North Rhine-Westphalia. It consists of a passenger station and a freight yard about a kilometre to the north. Both parts of the station are on the Left Rhine line (German: Linke Rheinstrecke); the freight yard also has a connection via Brühl-Vochem to the Cologne port and freight railway network (Häfen und Güterverkehr Köln AG, HGK).

== History ==
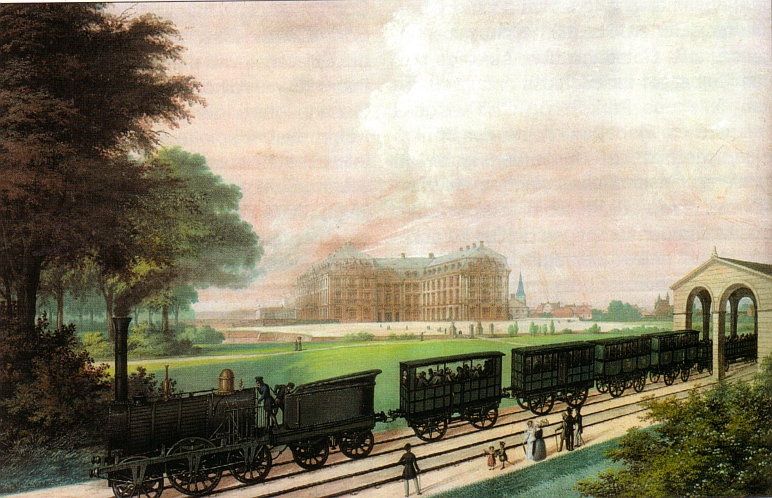
Opening in 1844

Brühl station was opened on 15 February 1844 by the Bonn-Cologne Railway Company (Bonn-Cölner Eisenbahn-Gesellschaft, BCE) on the occasion of the visit of Queen Victoria and was from the beginning the most important stop between Cologne and Bonn. The station building was built on the first single-track line in sight of the Augustusburg Palace to a design by Johann Peter Weyer. Since large parts of the line run through the manorial estates, the royal family was able to assert its power in the area.

In 1869, a second track was built, and the station building was relocated to a central platform. At this time the freight yard was located just to the north on the eastern side of the line.

In 1910 to 1913 there was an extensive reorganisation of the railways in Brühl. In particular, it included the construction of a four-metre-high (13 ft) embankment to enable the removal of level crossings with other transport routes. The station was on both sides of the line with a passing track and two island platforms between the main tracks and the siding, which are reached by an underpass. Since there was no longer enough room near the station for the freight yard, it was moved further north on the western side of the track. Between the two parts of the station, a bridge carried the lateral line of the Cologne port and freight railway over the Left Rhine line; this connected via a circular route to the Köln-Bonner Eisenbahnen (KBE, "Cologne-Bonn Railway") line (now line 18 of the Cologne Stadtbahn) and from Vochem a track branched off to the new freight yard.

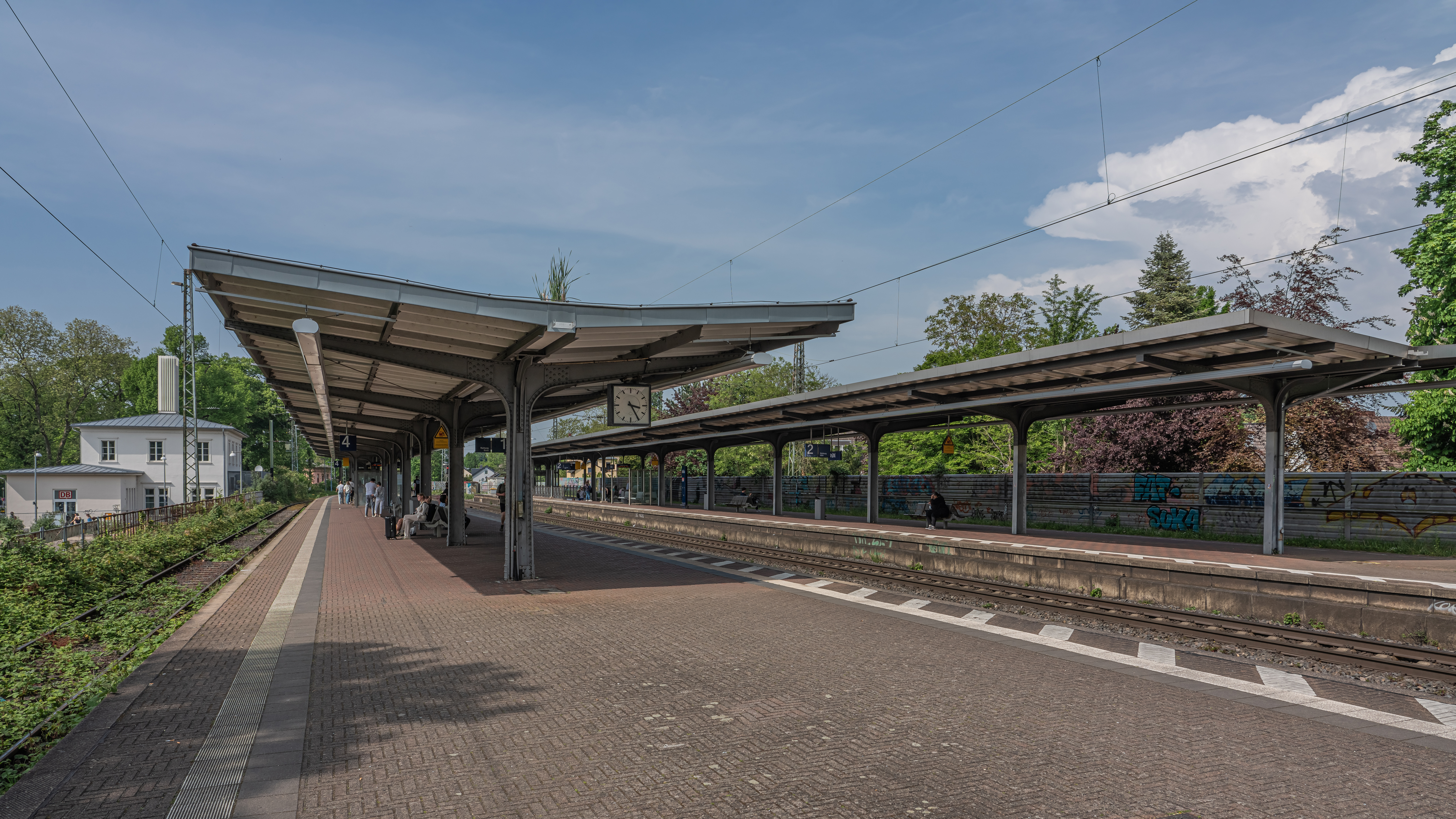
Platforms of Brühl station

In a railway accident at Brühl on 6 February 2000, nine people lost their lives and 149 more were injured when a train running from the north on the opposite track at excessive speed ran on to the eastern siding and derailed. While the front of the train plunged down the embankment and slammed into an apartment building, the rear part of it was pulled across the platform and was crushed against a pillar supporting the platform roof. Contributing factors in the accident included the separation of the freight and passenger sections of the station along with the lack of intermediate as well as exit signals and the operations of trains on the main track in the opposite direction to normal operations. During the clean up after the accident, the siding on the eastern side was completely removed, the platform was shortened and a noise barrier was built on the eastern side.

As part of the North Rhine-Westphalia modernisation campaign of 2006, the access tunnel to the platform was widened and the stairs were provided with wheel chair lifts.

== Train services ==
The station is served by the following services:

- Regional services RE 5 Rhein-Express Emmerich – Wesel – Oberhausen – Duisburg – Düsseldorf – Cologne – Bonn – Koblenz
- Local services RB 26 MittelrheinBahn Cologne – Bonn – Remagen – Andernach – Koblenz
- Local services RB 48 Rhein-Wupper-Bahn Wuppertal-Oberbarmen – Wuppertal – Solingen – Cologne – Bonn – Bonn-Mehlem

== Bus services ==
The only bus connection to station is line 990, running every half hour on weekdays and every hour on weekends. In the summer months there is also a private shuttle service to Phantasialand.
