= Bonn Hauptbahnhof =

Railway station in Germany

Bonn Hbf
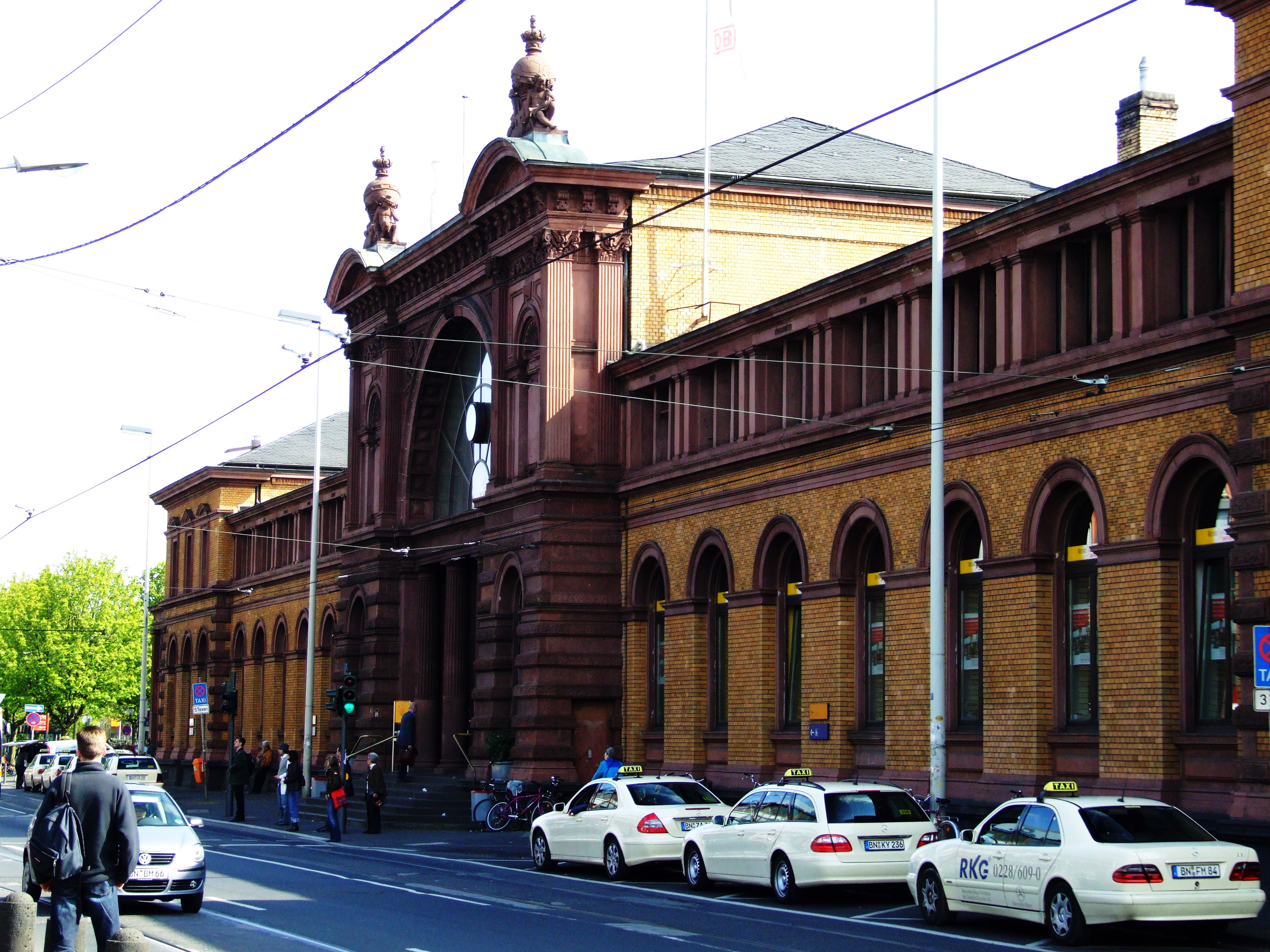
- Entrance of the station (2008)

General information
- Location: Am Hauptbahnhof 1, Bonn, NRW; Germany
- Coordinates: 50°43′55″N 7°5′49″E
- Lines: Left Rhine line; Voreifel Railway
- Platforms: 3
- Tracks: 5

Construction
- Accessible: Yes
- Architectural style: Neo-Renaissance

Other information
- Station code: 0767
- DS100 code: KB
- IBNR: 8000044
- Category: 2
- Fare zone: VRS: 2600
- Website: www.bahnhof.de

History
- Opening: 22 April 1885
Services
Preceding station	DB Fernverkehr	Following station
Köln Hbf towards Hamburg-Altona	ICE 1 Sprinter	Koblenz Hbf towards Passau Hbf
Köln Hbf towards Berlin Südkreuz or Berlin Ostbahnhof	ICE 9 Sprinter	Terminus
Köln Hbf towards Berlin Ostbahnhof	ICE 19	Remagen towards Koblenz Hbf
Köln Hbf towards Norddeich Mole	IC 35	Remagen towards Koblenz Hbf
Köln Hbf towards Dresden Hbf	IC 55	Koblenz Hbf towards Stuttgart Hbf or Tübingen Hbf
Köln Hbf towards Dortmund Hbf	IC 55 Allgäu	Koblenz Hbf towards Oberstdorf
Köln Hbf towards Dortmund Hbf	ICE 91	Koblenz Hbf towards Wien Hbf
Preceding station	ÖBB	Following station
Köln Hbf towards Amsterdam Centraal	Nightjet	Offenburg towards Zürich HB
Preceding station	National Express Germany	Following station
Bonn UN Campus towards Koblenz Hbf	RE 5 (Rhein-Express)	Brühl towards Wesel
Bonn UN Campus towards Bonn-Mehlem	RB 48 (Rhein-Wupper-Bahn)	Roisdorf towards Wuppertal-Oberbarmen
Preceding station	Trans Regio	Following station
Bonn UN Campus towards Mainz Hbf	RB 26	Roisdorf towards Köln Messe/Deutz
Preceding station	DB Regio NRW	Following station
Bonn UN Campus towards Ahrbrück	RB 30	Terminus
Preceding station	Cologne S-Bahn	Following station
Bonn-Endenich Nord towards Euskirchen	S23	Terminus
Preceding station	Bonn Stadtbahn	Following station
Bonn West towards Niehl Sebastianstraße	Line 16	Universität/Markt towards Bad Godesberg Stadthalle
Bonn West towards Thielenbruch	Line 18	Terminus
Bonn West towards Tannenbusch Mitte	Line 63	Universität/Markt towards Bad Godesberg Stadthalle
Stadthaus towards Siegburg/Bonn	Line 67	Universität/Markt towards Bad Godesberg Stadthalle
Stadthaus towards Siegburg/Bonn	Line 66	Universität/Markt towards Bad Honnef
Bonn West towards Bornheim	Line 68	Universität/Markt towards Ramersdorf
Preceding station	Straßenbahn Bonn	Following station
Poppelsdorfer Allee towards Dottendorf	Line 61	Thomas-Mann-Straße towards Kopenhagener Straße
Poppelsdorfer Allee towards Dottendorf	Line 62	Thomas-Mann-Straße towards Oberkassel Süd/Römlinghoven
Location

Bonn Hauptbahnhof (Bonn Central Station) is a railway station located on the left bank of the Rhine along the Cologne–Mainz line. It is the principal station serving the city of Bonn. In addition to extensive rail service from Deutsche Bahn it acts as a hub for local bus, tram, and Stadtbahn services.

== History ==
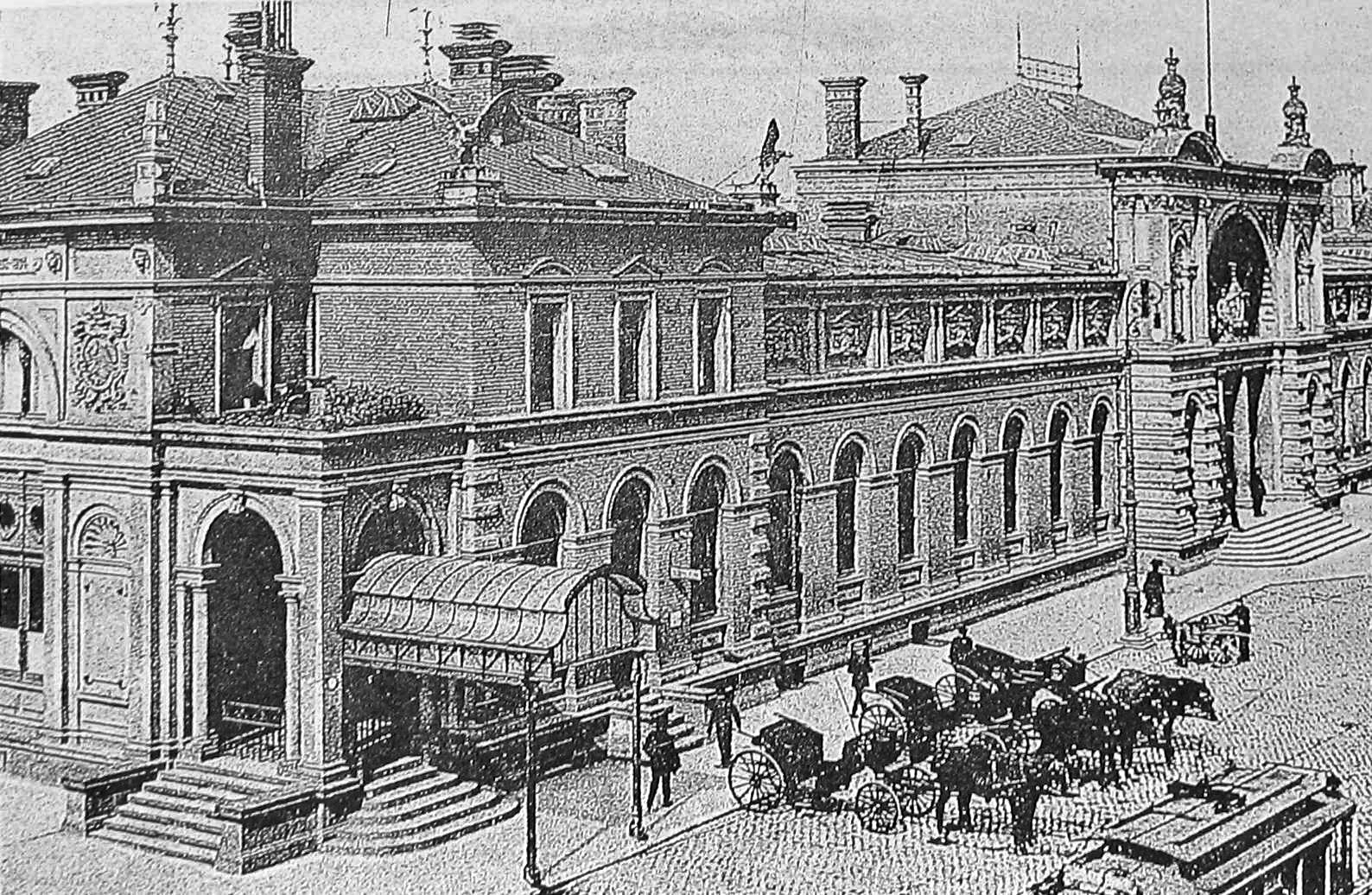
Bonn station in 1900

The first station was constructed in 1844 by the Bonn-Cologne Railway Company, as part of the West Rhine Railway. The current building was erected between 1883 and 1884. From 1870 a train ferry connected Bonn station to the East Rhine Railway. With the opening of the Voreifel Railway to Euskirchen, the station became a rail junction.

In 1883 and 1884, a new station building was erected, which is now heritage listed.

The station sharply increased in importance in 1949, when Bonn became capital of the Federal Republic. Many politicians and federal employees travelled by train, as did guests of the state.

In 1969, Bonn grew considerably by incorporating towns which includes the stations of Bad Godesberg, Beuel, Duisdorf, Oberkassel and Mehlem and, in 1971, the station was renamed Bonn Hauptbahnhof.

Northwest of the station there used to be a small freight yard, which is now closed and partially demolished. The remaining tracks are used to allow freight trains to be overtaken and as a yard for assembling passenger trains and parking freight wagons. The Rhine Shore station (Rheinuferbahnhof) of the former Cologne-Bonn Railway (Köln-Bonner Eisenbahnen AG, KBE) was next to the station until 1985. As part of the construction of the Bonn Stadtbahn in the early 1970s, the existing buildings at the station were demolished and rebuilt. The design of the station forecourt was soon the subject of much controversy among the public of Bonn and there were several attempts to redesign it.

During the planning phase of the Cologne–Frankfurt high-speed line in the 1980s and early 1990s, a proposal to build a new line via Bonn station was controversial. This proposed a tunnel under the city, which would begin on the northern outskirts of Bonn and run through a deep level station 35 m below the main station. After crossing under the government district, the Rhine and the Siebengebirge hills to reach the line route that favoured by the Deutsche Bundesbahn to run via Limburg an der Lahn to Frankfurt. The additional cost of this option was estimated at half a billion Euros. In addition, a route via Bonn-Beuel and Aegidienberg through a 14 km long tunnel was also considered. Today, Bonn Hauptbahnhof is connected indirectly to the high-speed line, by tram line 66 of the Bonn Stadtbahn to Siegburg/Bonn station. Despite Intercity-Express services running through Siegburg/Bonn rather than Bonn, Bonn Hauptbahnhof is still a major stop for long-distance traffic.

== Stadtbahn ==
Located beneath the main platforms are two underground platforms served by the Bonn Stadtbahn. Bonn Hauptbahnhof sits astride the north–south and east–west axes of the network and consequently sees daily about 50,000 passengers. The current facility opened in 1979.

== Train services ==
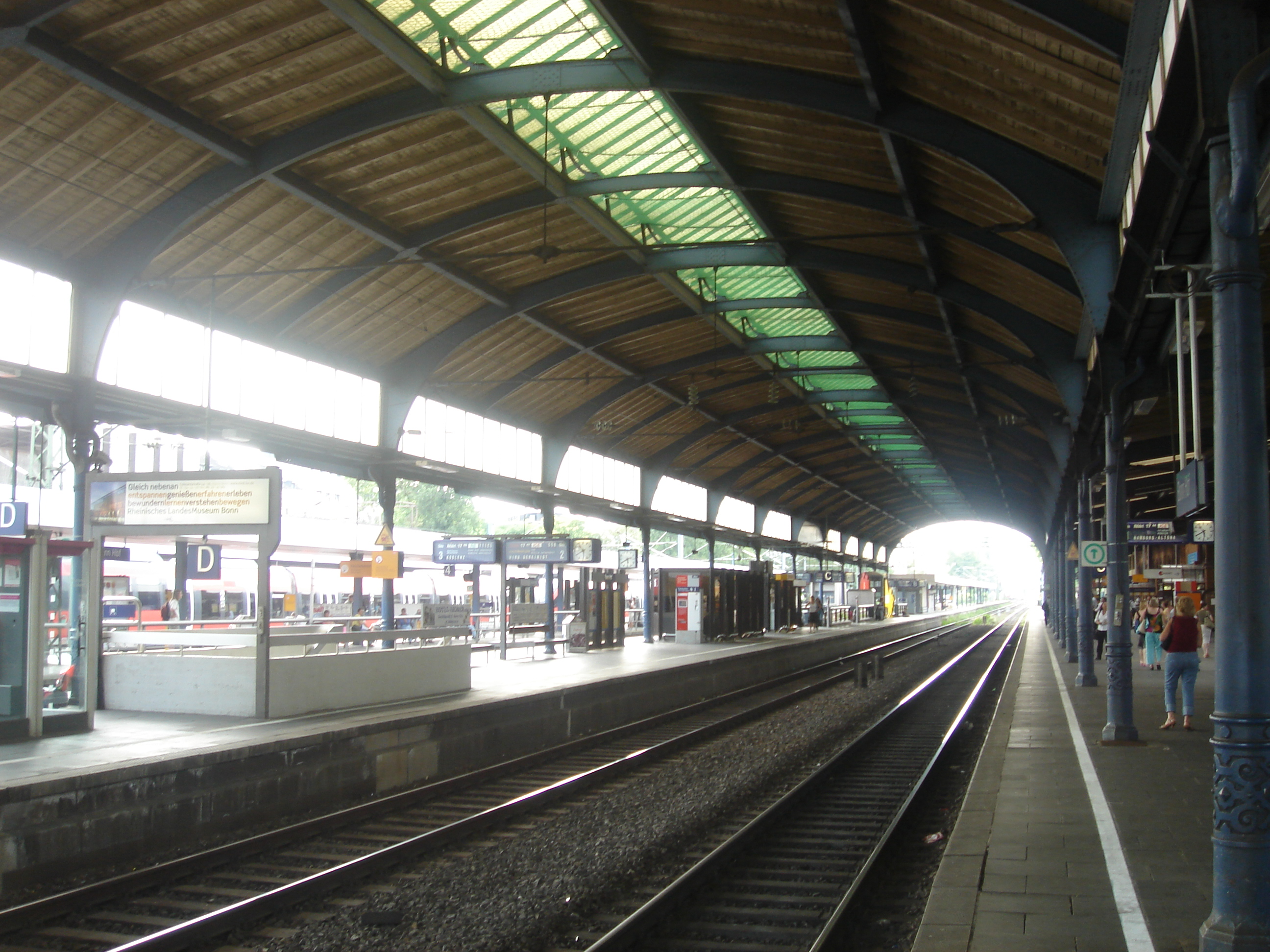
Platforms and tracks

In the 2026 timetable, the following services stop at the station:

=== Long-distance ===
Around 75 long-distance trains stop at Bonn Hauptbahnhof every day, including, since December 2021, the ICE Sprinter from Bonn to Berlin (only stopping at Cologne Hbf). The station is served by the following services.

Line	Route		Frequency
ICE 1	Hamburg-Altona – Hamburg – Essen – Duisburg – Düsseldorf – Cologne – Bonn – Koblenz – Mainz – Frankfurt Airport – Frankfurt – Würzburg – Nuremberg – Regensburg – Passau		Two train pairs
ICE 9	Berlin Ostbahnhof –	Berlin – Berlin-Spandau – Cologne – Bonn	Three train pairs
ICE 9	Berlin Südkreuz	Berlin – Berlin-Spandau – Cologne – Bonn	Three train pairs
ICE 19	Berlin Ostbahnhof – Berlin – (Wolfsburg –) Hannover – Bielefeld – Hamm – Hagen – Wuppertal – Cologne – Bonn – Koblenz		3 train pairs
IC 35	(Norddeich Mole – Emden –) Münster – Recklinghausen – Wanne-Eickel – Gelsenkirchen – Oberhausen – Duisburg – Düsseldorf – Cologne – Bonn – Koblenz – Mainz – Mannheim – Stuttgart / Konstanz		Some trains
IC 37	Düsseldorf – Cologne – Bonn – Koblenz – Cochem – Bullay – Wittlich – Trier – Wasserbillig – Luxembourg		1 train pair
IC 55; ICE 55	Dresden – Leipzig – Halle – Magdeburg – Hannover – Hamm – Dortmund – Wuppertal – Cologne – Bonn – Koblenz – Mainz – Mannheim – Heidelberg – Vaihingen – Stuttgart (– Reutlingen – Tübingen)		Every 2 hours
IC 55; ICE 55	Dortmund – Essen – Düsseldorf – Cologne – Bonn – Koblenz – Mainz – Mannheim – Heidelberg – Stuttgart – Ulm – Oberstdorf		1 train pair
ICE 91	Dortmund – Bochum – Essen – Duisburg – Düsseldorf – Cologne – Bonn – Koblenz – Mainz – Frankfurt Airport – Frankfurt – Hanau – Würzburg – Nuremberg – Regensburg – Plattling – Passau – Wels – Linz – St. Pölten – Wien Meidling – Vienna		Every 2 hours
Nightjet	Amsterdam – Utrecht – Arnhem – Düsseldorf – Cologne – Bonn – Freiburg – Basel – Zürich		1 train pair

=== Regional and S-Bahn services ===
Line	Route	Frequency
RE 5 Rhein-Express	Emmerich – Wesel – Oberhausen – Duisburg – Düsseldorf - Cologne – Bonn – Koblenz	Hourly
RB 26; MittelrheinBahn	Cologne – Bonn – Remagen – Andernach – Koblenz – Bingen – Mainz	Hourly
RB 30; Rhein-Ahr-Bahn	Bonn – Remagen – Bad Neuenahr – Dernau – Ahrbrück	Hourly
RB 48; Rhein-Wupper-Bahn	Bonn-Mehlem – Bonn – Cologne – Solingen – Wuppertal – Wuppertal-Oberbarmen	30 min (W-Oberbarmen–Cologne); 60 min (Cologne–Bonn); 30 min (peak); 60 min (Bonn Hbf–Bonn–Mehlem)
S23; Cologne S-Bahn	Bonn – Meckenheim – Rheinbach (– Euskirchen)	15 min (Bonn–Rheinbach during peak); 30 min

=== Stadtbahn services ===
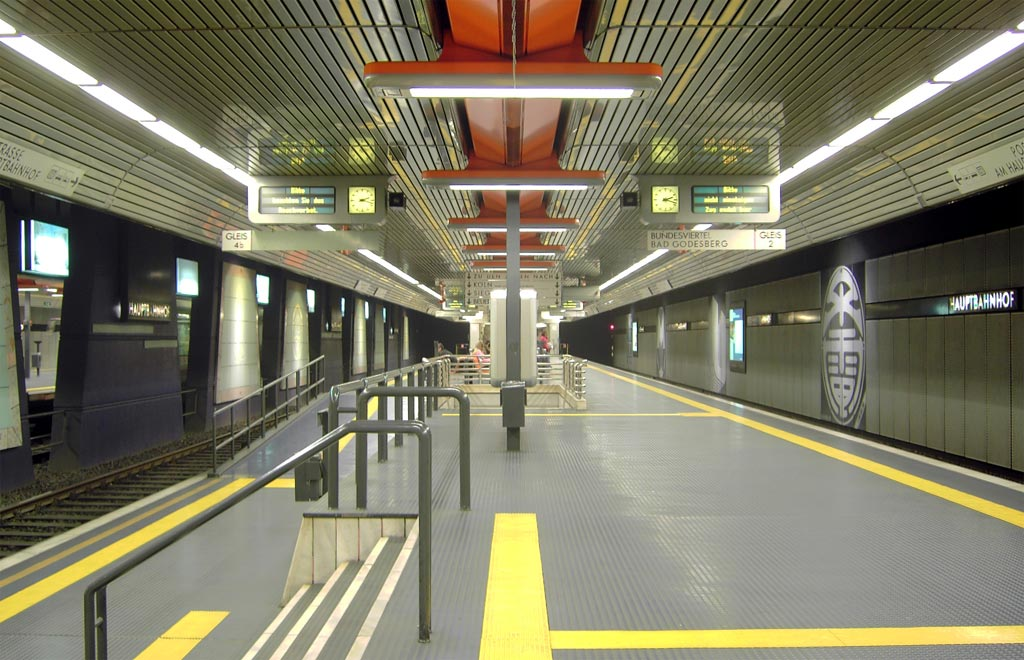
U-Bahn station

- : Köln-Niehl-Sebastianstraße - Köln Hauptbahnhof - Rheinuferbahn - Bonn Hauptbahnhof - Stammstrecke - Bad Godesberg
- : Thielenbruch – Köln Hauptbahnhof - Vorgebirgsbahn - Bonn Hauptbahnhof
- : Tannenbusch – Rheinuferbahn – Bonn Hauptbahnhof – Stammstrecke – Bad Godesberg
- : Siegburg – Bonn Hauptbahnhof – Stammstrecke – Ramersdorf – Bad Honnef
- : Siegburg – Bonn Hauptbahnhof – Stammstrecke – Bad Godesberg
- : Bornheim – Bonn Hauptbahnhof – Stammstrecke – Ramersdorf

=== Tram services ===
Two tram lines serve a surface-level stop in front of Bonn Hauptbahnhof:

- : Auerberg – Bonn Hauptbahnhof – Dottendorf
- : Oberkassel – Beuel – Bonn Hauptbahnhof – Dottendorf

== See also ==
- Rail transport in Germany
- Railway stations in Germany
