= Hochkreuz station =

Railway station in Bonn, Germany

Hochkreuz
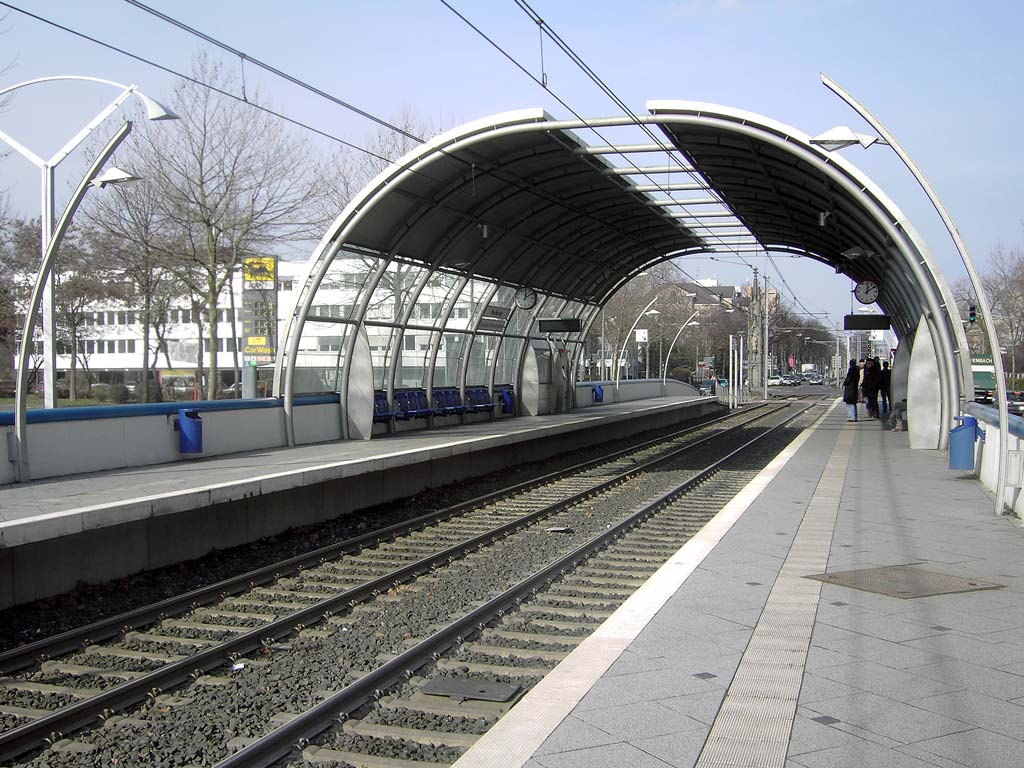

General information
- Coordinates: 50°41′47″N 7°08′31″E
- System: Bonn Stadtbahn station
- Owner: Stadtwerke Bonn; Kölner Verkehrs-Betriebe
- Line: 16, 63
- Platforms: 2 side platform
- Tracks: 2
- Connections: 67

Construction
- Structure type: At grade
- Parking: No
- Cycle facilities: No

Other information
- Fare zone: VRS: 2600

Services
Preceding station	Bonn Stadtbahn	Following station
Max-Löbner-Straße towards Niehl Sebastianstraße	Line 16	Wurzerstraße towards Bad Godesberg Stadthalle
Max-Löbner-Straße towards Tannenbusch Mitte	Line 63	Wurzerstraße towards Bad Godesberg Stadthalle
Max-Löbner-Straße towards Siegburg/Bonn	Line 67	Wurzerstraße towards Bad Godesberg Stadthalle
Location

Hochkreuz is a Bonn Stadtbahn station served by lines 16, 63 and 67. It is located on the Bad Godesberg branch, the next four stops are underground, including the terminus.

This station is located near the High Cross.
