= Plittersdorfer Straße station =

Railway station in Bonn, Germany

Coordinates: 50.6879°N 7.1535°E

Plittersdorfer Straße
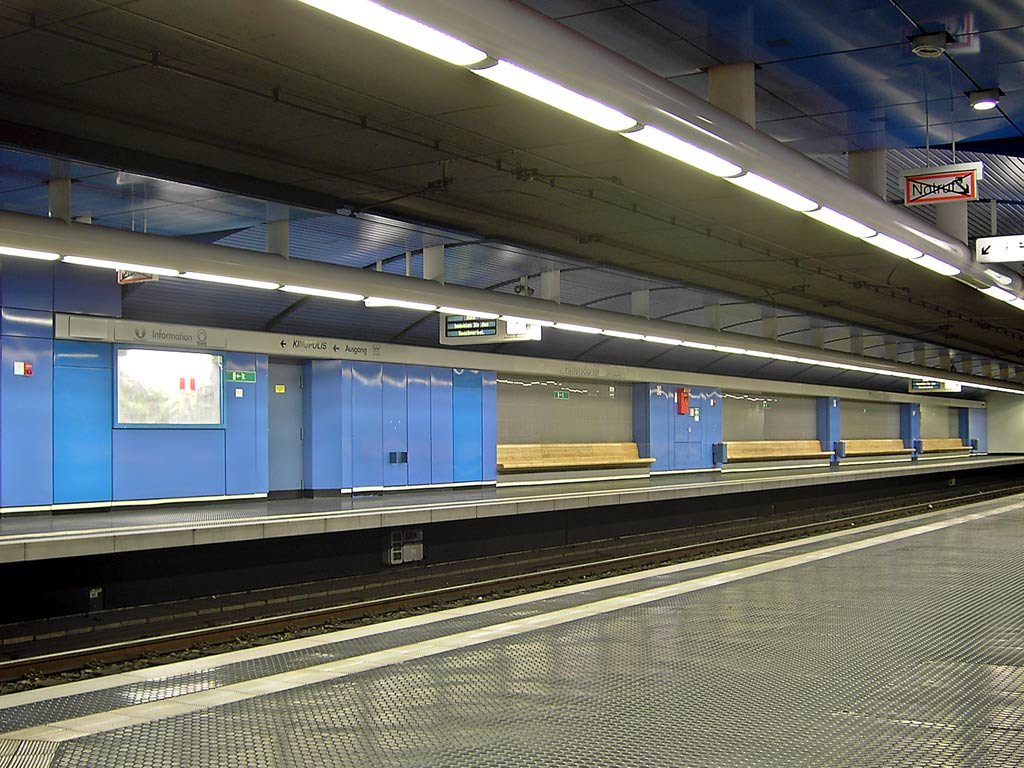

General information
- System: Bonn Stadtbahn station
- Line: 16, 63
- Platforms: 2 side platforms
- Tracks: 2
- Connections: 67

Construction
- Structure type: Underground

Other information
- Fare zone: VRS: 2600

Services
Preceding station	Bonn Stadtbahn	Following station
Wurzerstraße towards Niehl Sebastianstraße	Line 16	Bonn-Bad Godesberg towards Bad Godesberg Stadthalle
Wurzerstraße towards Tannenbusch Mitte	Line 63	Bonn-Bad Godesberg towards Bad Godesberg Stadthalle
Wurzerstraße towards Siegburg/Bonn	Line 67	Bonn-Bad Godesberg towards Bad Godesberg Stadthalle
Location

Plittersdorfer Straße is a Bonn Stadtbahn station in Bonn-Bad Godesberg, served by lines 16, 63 and 67. The tiles of the station are colored blue.
