= UN Campus, Bonn =

United Nations offices in Bonn, Germany

- Location within Germany

General information
- Location: Bonn, North Rhine-Westphalia, Germany
- Coordinates: 50.7181°N 7.1272°E
- Current tenants: United Nations
- Inaugurated: 2006
- Owner: Institute for Federal Real Estate

Other information
- Public transit: RE 5 (RRX)RB 26RB 30RB 48 Bonn UN Campus

Website
- www.unbonn.org

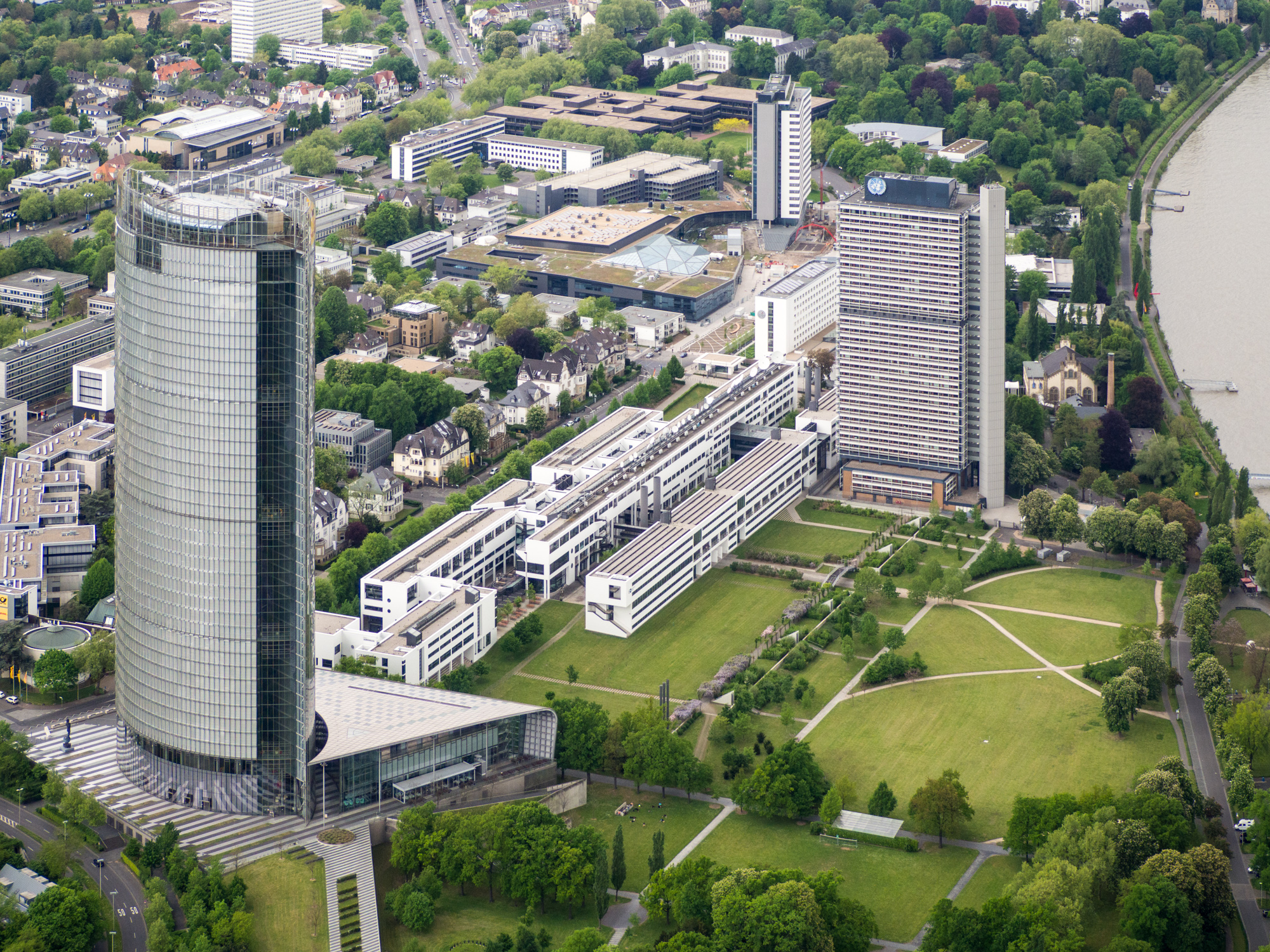
Aerial view of the campus

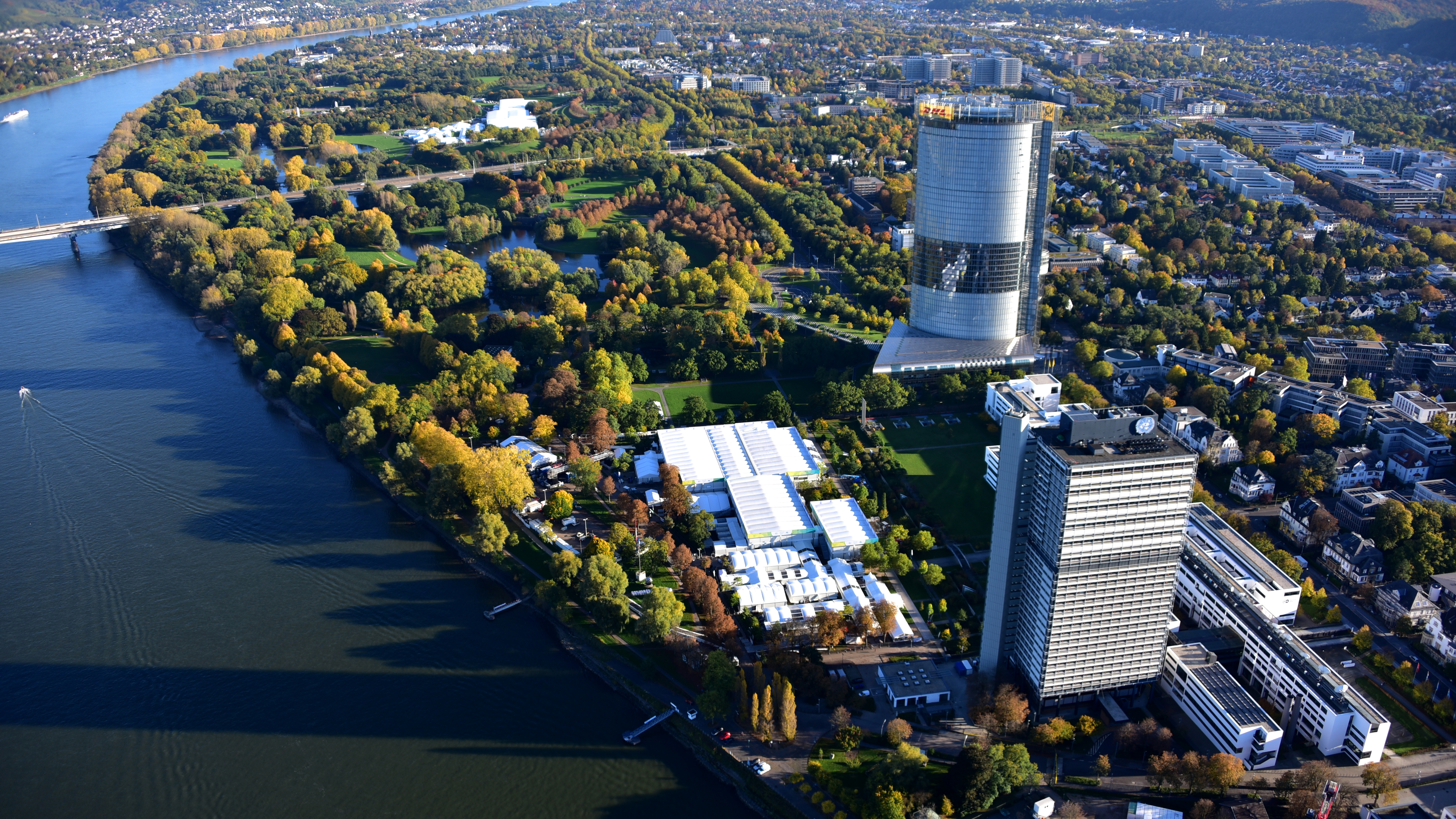
COP 23 with 'Bula zone' near river Rhine

The UN Campus in Bonn, Germany, is seat to 18 organizations of the United Nations. It was opened in July 2006 by then-secretary-general Kofi Annan and then-chancellor of Germany Angela Merkel and expanded in July 2013.

The UN Campus is owned by the Institute for Federal Real Estate and used rent-free by the United Nations.

The 2017 United Nations Climate Change Conference (COP 23) was held on 6–17 November 2017 there and in World Conference Center Bonn (WCCB), near the UNFCCC secretariat, for the Republic of Fiji.

== Constituent agencies ==
=== Agencies/offices ===
The following United Nations entities are based, or have offices, at the campus in Bonn:

- Intergovernmental Science-Policy Platform on Biodiversity and Ecosystem Services
- SDG Action Campaign
- United Nations Educational, Scientific and Cultural Organization
  - International Centre for Technical and Vocational Education and Training
- United Nations Global Center for Human Resources Services
- United Nations Industrial Development Organization
  - Investment and Technology Promotion Office Germany
- United Nations Office for Disaster Risk Reduction
- United Nations Office for Outer Space Affairs
  - United Nations Platform for Space-based Information for Disaster Management and Emergency Response
- United Nations Regional Information Centre
  - Liaison office in Germany
- United Nations System Staff College
  - Knowledge Centre for Sustainable Development
- United Nations University
  - Institute for Environment and Human Security
  - Vice Rectorate in Europe
  - Vice Rectorate in Europe, Sustainable Cycles Programme
- United Nations Volunteers
- World Health Organization
  - European Centre for Environment and Health

=== Secretariats ===
The following all have their secretariat offices based at the Bonn campus:

- Agreement on the Conservation of African-Eurasian Migratory Waterbirds
- Agreement on the Conservation of Small Cetaceans of the Baltic, North East Atlantic, Irish and North Seas
- Agreement on the Conservation of Populations of European Bats
- Convention on the Conservation of Migratory Species of Wild Animals
- United Nations Convention to Combat Desertification
- United Nations Framework Convention on Climate Change
