= Wurzerstraße station =

Railway station in Bonn, Germany

Wurzerstraße
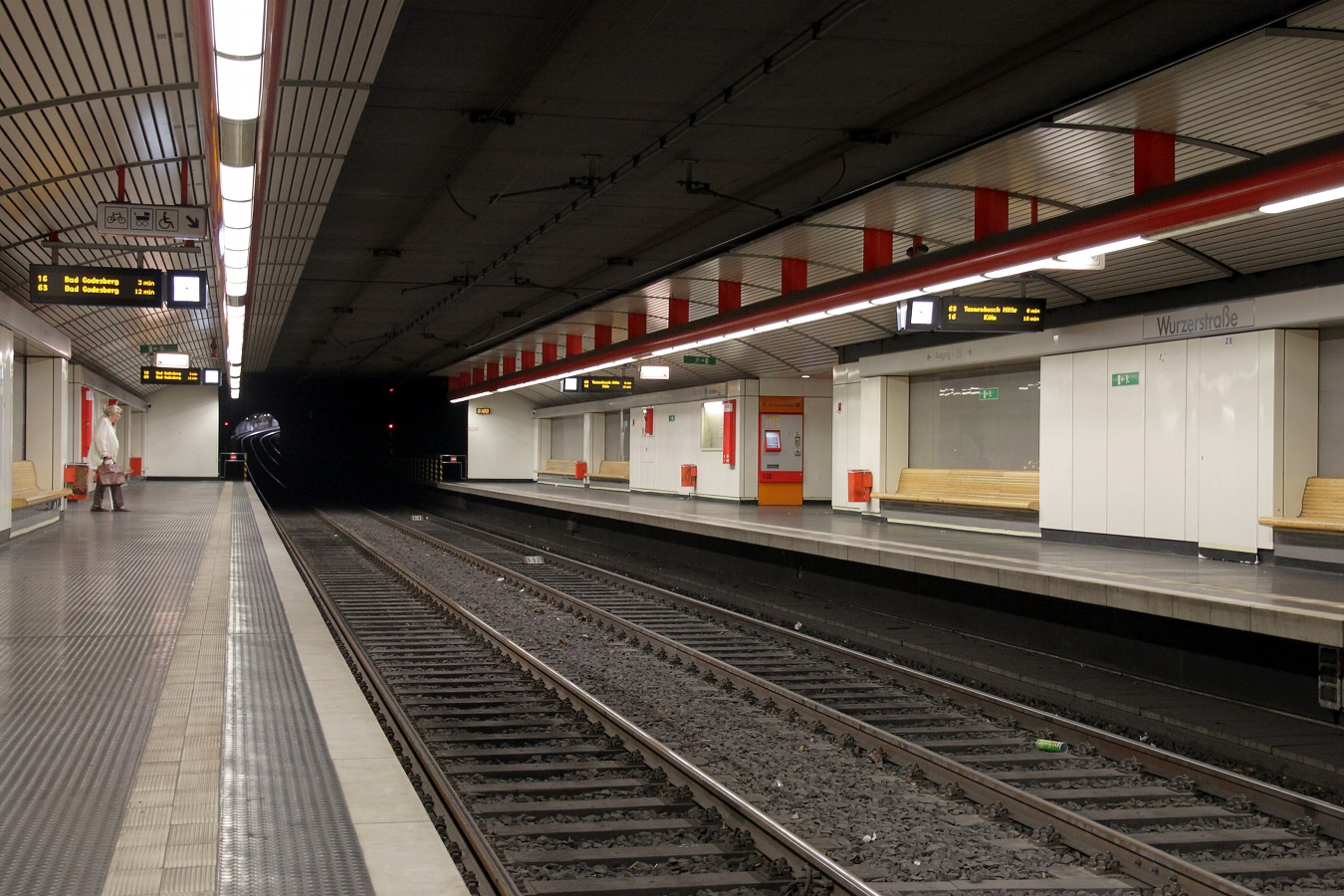
- Wurzerstraße station in 2011

General information
- Coordinates: 50.6920°N 7.1473°E
- System: Bonn Stadtbahn station
- Line: 63, 67
- Platforms: 2 side platforms
- Tracks: 2
- Connections: 16

Construction
- Structure type: Underground
- Platform levels: 2

Other information
- Fare zone: VRS: 2600
Location

Wurzerstraße is one of the four underground stations on the Bad Godesberg branch served by both Cologne and Bonn Stadtbahn. This station is served by line 16, 63 and 67. Because the Bad Godesberg underground stations have 4-main color tiles, the Wurzerstraße have red tiles.

Preceding station	Bonn Stadtbahn	Following station
Hochkreuz towards Niehl Sebastianstraße	Line 16	Plittersdorfer Straße towards Bad Godesberg Stadthalle
Hochkreuz towards Tannenbusch Mitte	Line 63	Plittersdorfer Straße towards Bad Godesberg Stadthalle
Hochkreuz towards Siegburg/Bonn	Line 67	Plittersdorfer Straße towards Bad Godesberg Stadthalle
