= Tannenbusch Dunes =

Coordinates: 50.745°N 7.061°E

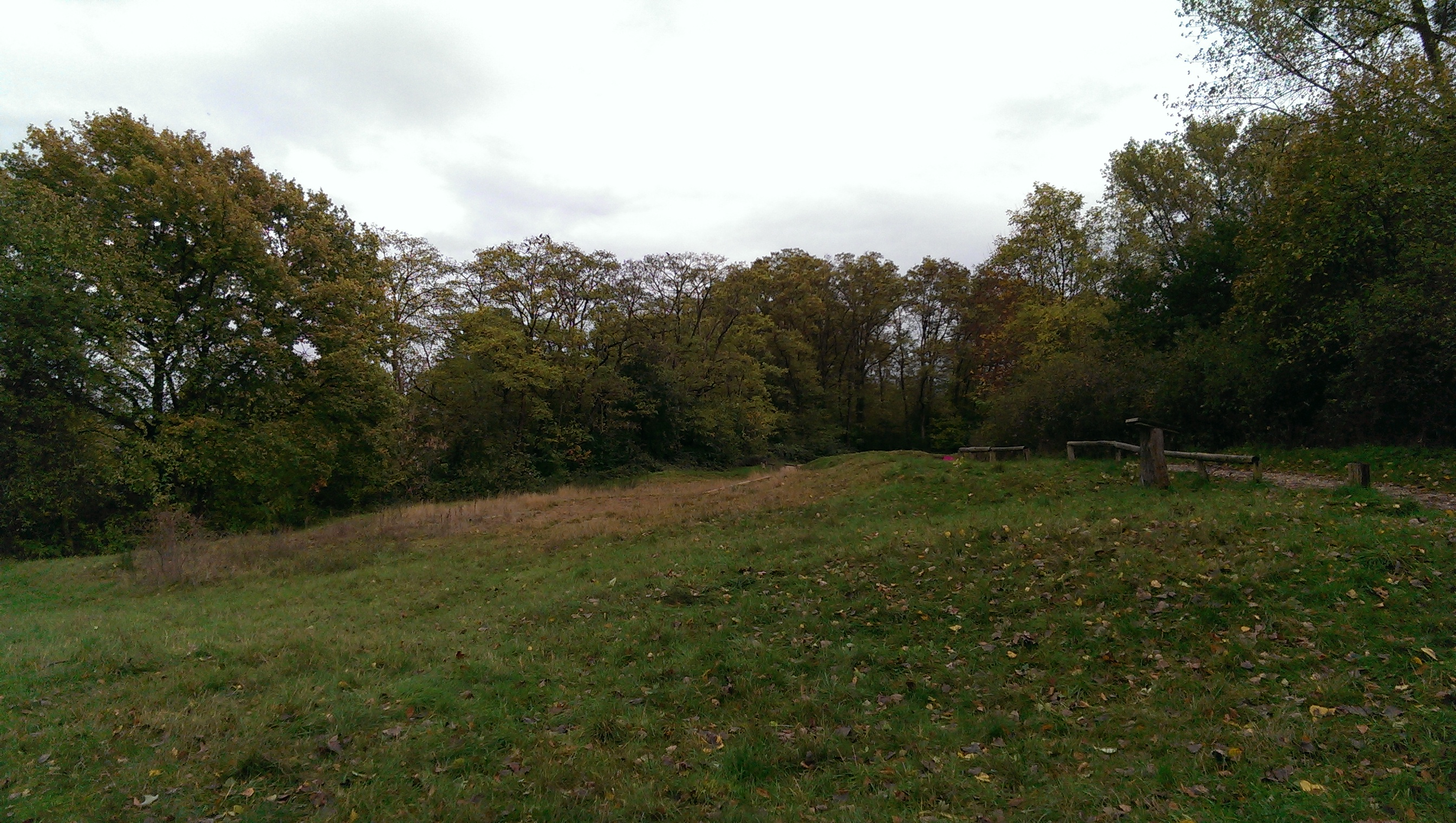
Tannenbusch Dunes

Tannenbusch Dunes is a nature reserve located in the Tannenbusch section of Bonn. The nature reserve consists of inland dunes and measures 6.7ha. The dunes appeared after the last ice age, approximately 10,000 years ago. Because the region had no vegetation at that time, the sand was blown into this area from an old river bed of the Rhine. The dunes are the remains of a former wider open sand area that is nowadays mostly covered by a residential zone. The body of the dunes is clearly visible because it sticks 2 – 3 meters out of the surroundings. The sandy soil distinguishes itself by being dry, porous, and poor in nutritions and number of specific plants, such as the grey hair-grass and other endangered species are adapted to these extreme soil conditions. To preserve the specific biotope of the area fertilizing substances are not used in the maintenance of the soil. Next to the plants, the dunes also provide a viable habitat for rare animals. The sunny and dry spots are of special importance to particular insect types such as grasshoppers, wild bees and wasps.
