= Johann Peter Weyer =

German architect

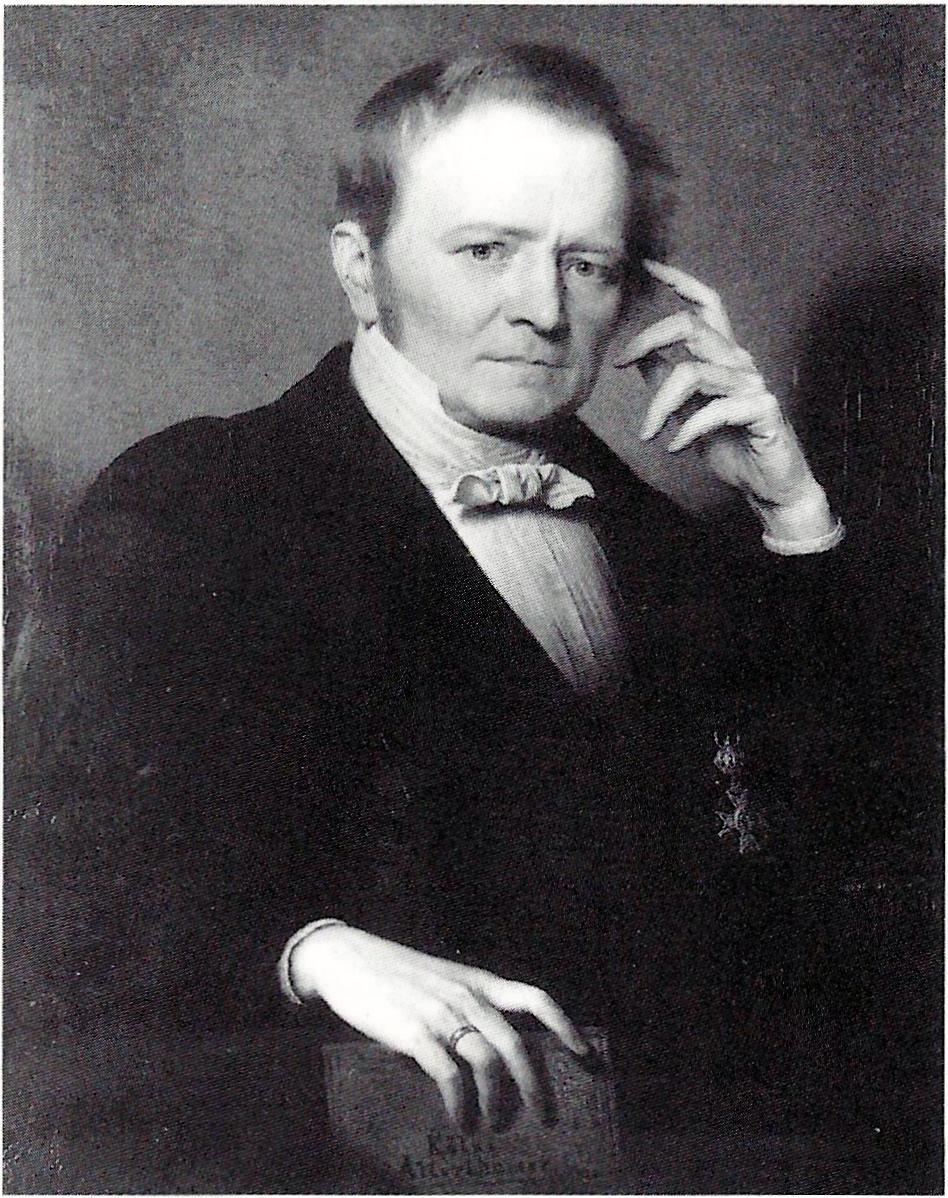
Johann Peter Weyer (1859)

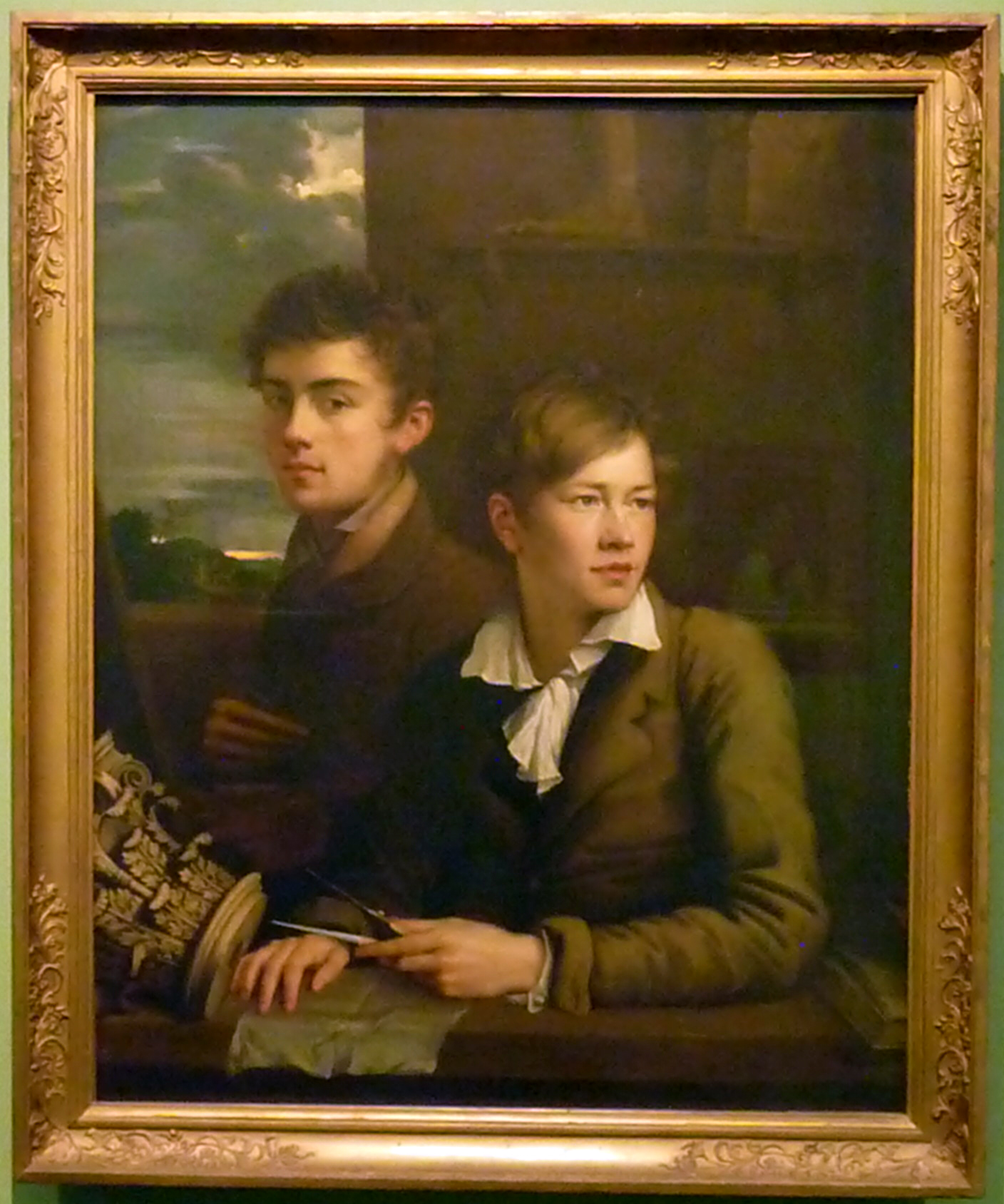
Portrait with and by Carl Joseph Begas (1813) Wallraf-Richartz Museum

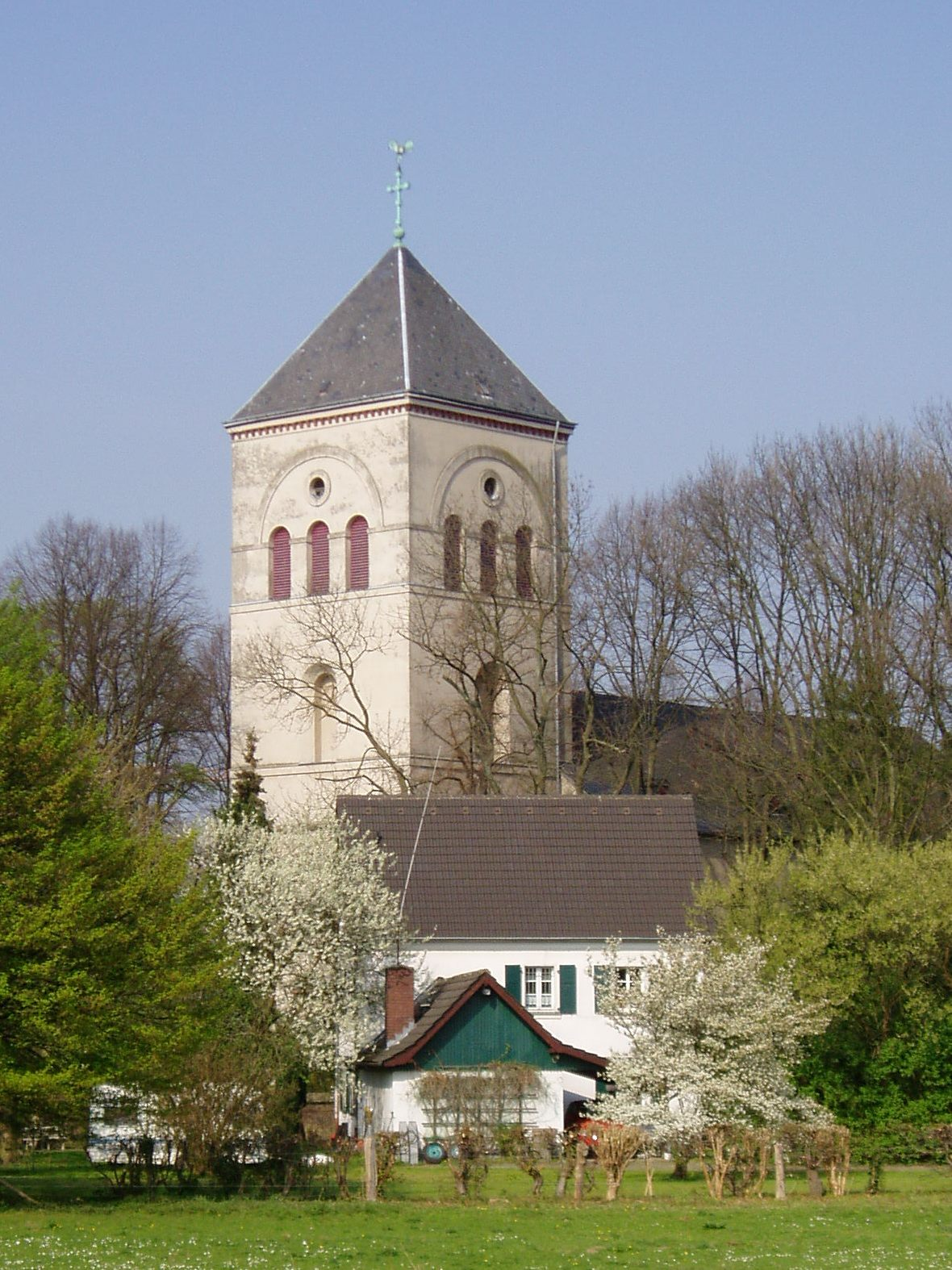
St. Gereon in Merheim

Johann Peter Joseph Weyer (19 May 1794, Cologne - 25 August 1864, Cologne) was a German architect, most notable as city architect to the city of Cologne.
