= Bonn UN Campus station =

Railway station in Bonn, Germany

Bonn UN Campus
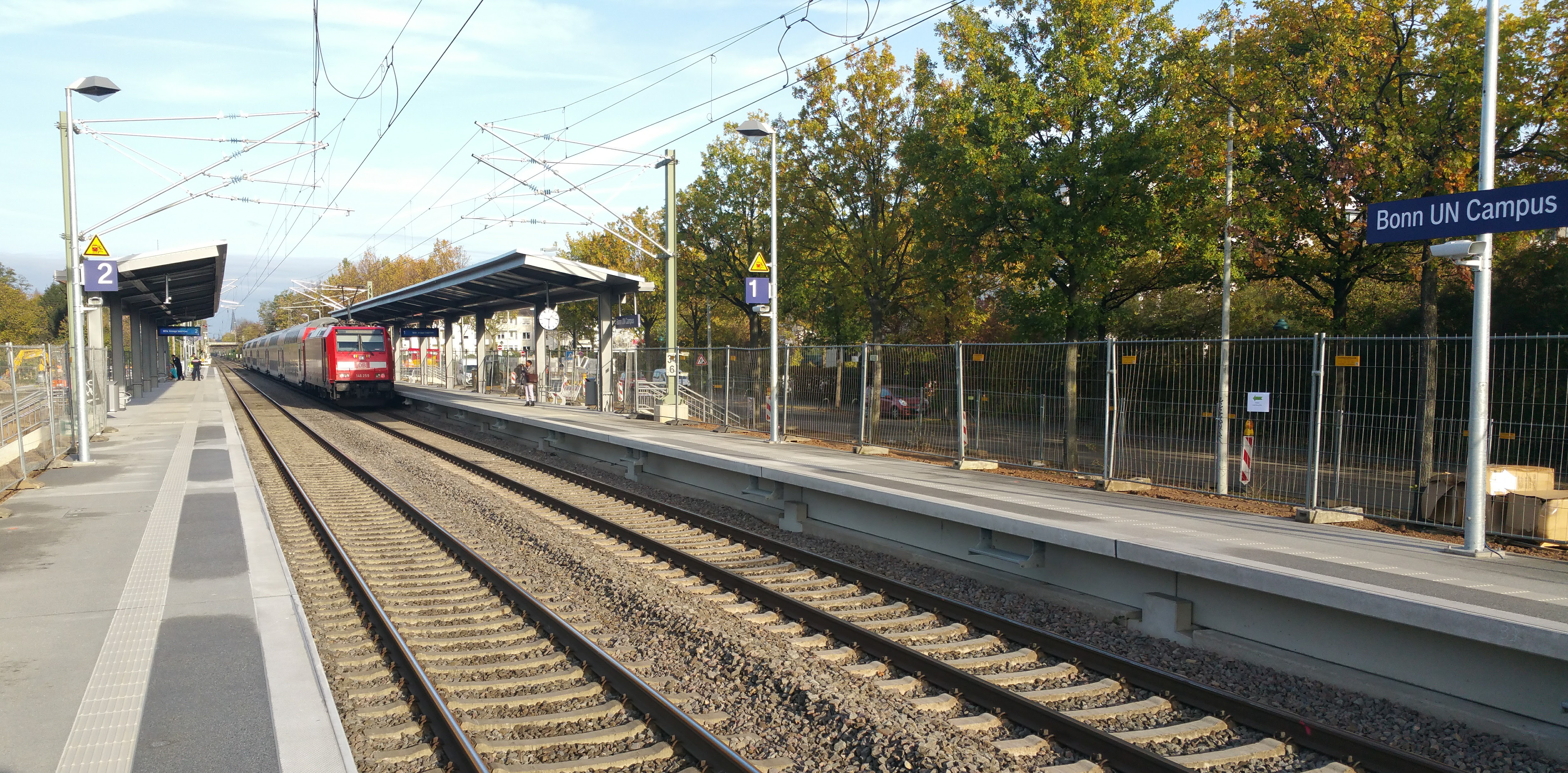

General information
- Location: Joseph-Beuys-Allee; 53113 Bonn, NRW; Germany
- Coordinates: 50.7144°N 7.1181°E
- Owner: DB Netz
- Operator: DB Station&Service
- Line: West Rhine Railway
- Platforms: 2
- Tracks: 2

Construction
- Accessible: Yes

Other information
- Station code: 8213
- DS100 code: KBUN
- IBNR: 8001091
- Category: 5
- Fare zone: VRS: 2600
- Website: www.bahnhof.de

History
- Opened: 1 November 2017; 8 years ago

Services
Preceding station	National Express Germany	Following station
Bonn-Bad Godesberg towards Koblenz Hbf	RE 5 (Rhein-Express)	Bonn Hbf towards Wesel
Bonn-Bad Godesberg towards Bonn-Mehlem	RB 48 (Rhein-Wupper-Bahn)	Bonn Hbf towards Wuppertal-Oberbarmen
Preceding station	DB Regio NRW	Following station
Bonn-Bad Godesberg towards Ahrbrück	RB 30	Bonn Hbf Terminus
Preceding station	Trans Regio	Following station
Bonn-Bad Godesberg towards Mainz Hbf	RB 26	Bonn Hbf towards Köln Messe/Deutz
Location
- Location within North Rhine-Westphalia

Bonn UN Campus station (German: Haltepunkt Bonn UN Campus) is a railway station in the town of Bonn, North Rhine-Westphalia, Germany. The station lies on the West Rhine Railway. Its name is derived from the UN Campus, Bonn.

== Location ==
The station is located on the border between the districts Gronau and Kessenich on the Left Rhine line between Bonn Hauptbahnhof and Bonn-Bad Godesberg. The aim of the construction project was the better connection to the northern part of the federal district. It was implemented at Genscherallee, not far from the Kunst- und Ausstellungshalle der Bundesrepublik Deutschland, Kunstmuseum Bonn and the headquarters of Deutsche Telekom and Deutsche Post. The name UN Campus refers to the center of the 19 United Nations organizations based in Bonn and is one of the city's biggest focal points of employment. However, the station will not only prove beneficial for visitors to UN organizations, but also for commuters from other companies such as Deutsche Telekom and Deutsche Post.
