= Roisdorf station =

Railway station in Germany

Roisdorf
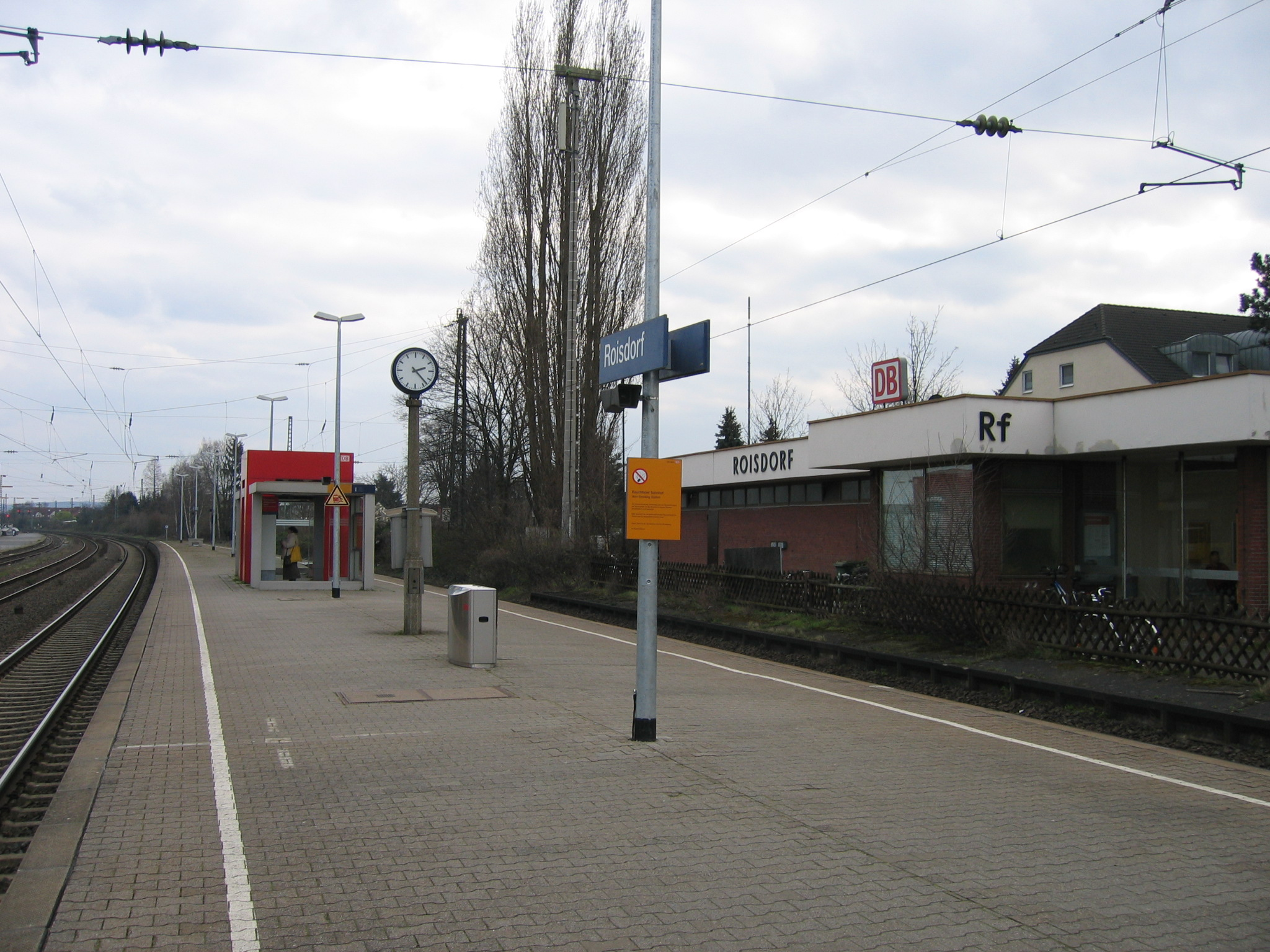
- 2007

General information
- Location: Bonner Str. 20, Bornheim, NRW; Germany
- Coordinates: 50°45′11″N 7°00′58″E
- Owner: DB Netz
- Operator: DB Station&Service
- Lines: West Rhine Railway (KBS 470)
- Platforms: 2

Construction
- Accessible: No

Other information
- Station code: 5326
- DS100 code: KROI
- IBNR: 8005152
- Category: 5
- Fare zone: VRS: 2531
- Website: www.bahnhof.de

History
- Opened: 1 March 1844

Services
Preceding station	National Express Germany	Following station
Bonn Hbf towards Bonn-Mehlem	RB 48 (Rhein-Wupper-Bahn)	Sechtem towards Wuppertal-Oberbarmen
Preceding station	Trans Regio	Following station
Bonn Hbf towards Mainz Hbf	RB 26	Sechtem towards Köln Messe/Deutz
Location
- Location within North Rhine-Westphalia

Roisdorf station is a through station in the district of Roisdorf of the town of Bornheim in the German state of North Rhine-Westphalia. It was opened on 1 March 1844 on the Left Rhine line, which was opened between Cologne and Bonn on 15 February 1844. It has two platform tracks and it is classified by Deutsche Bahn as a category 5 station.

The station is served by the following two lines:

Line	Line name	Route	Frequency	Operator
RB 26	MittelrheinBahn	Köln Messe/Deutz – Cologne – Roisdorf – Bonn – Remagen – Andernach – Koblenz-Stadtmitte - Koblenz - (Mainz)	1x per hour	trans regio
RB 48	Rhein-Wupper-Bahn	Wuppertal-Oberbarmen – Wuppertal – Cologne – Roisdorf – Bonn – Bonn-Mehlem	1x per hour	DB Regio NRW

It is also served by bus route 633, operated by SWB Bus und Bahn at 30-minute intervals.
