= Tannenbusch =

Section of Bonn, Germany

Coordinates: 50°44′51″N 7°03′27″E

Tannenbusch is a section of Bonn, Germany with approx. 17,000 inhabitants. It is split between the subsections Alt-Tannenbusch and Neu-Tannenbusch. The roads in Tannenbusch are almost exclusively named after places in the former GDR and former eastern territories of Germany (e.g. Schlesienstrasse, Oppelner road, west Prussia route). Around 1949 – 1960 there was a US military camp in Tannenbusch.

Of the 15000 inhabitants, 45% have a migrant background. About 40% of the inhabitants in the district live on state welfare payments.

== Alt-Tannenbusch ==
Alt-Tannenbusch was a settlement at the northwest outskirts of the town of Bonn, which was first developed between the wars, and developed further in the early postwar years. Alt-Tannenbusch surrounds a dune, which is a nature reserve, but is so closely forested that it is hard to tell. Among the inhabitants of the dune is a colony of free-living parrots. As of 2004 approx. 6,000 humans live in Alt-Tannenbusch.

== Neu-Tannenbusch ==
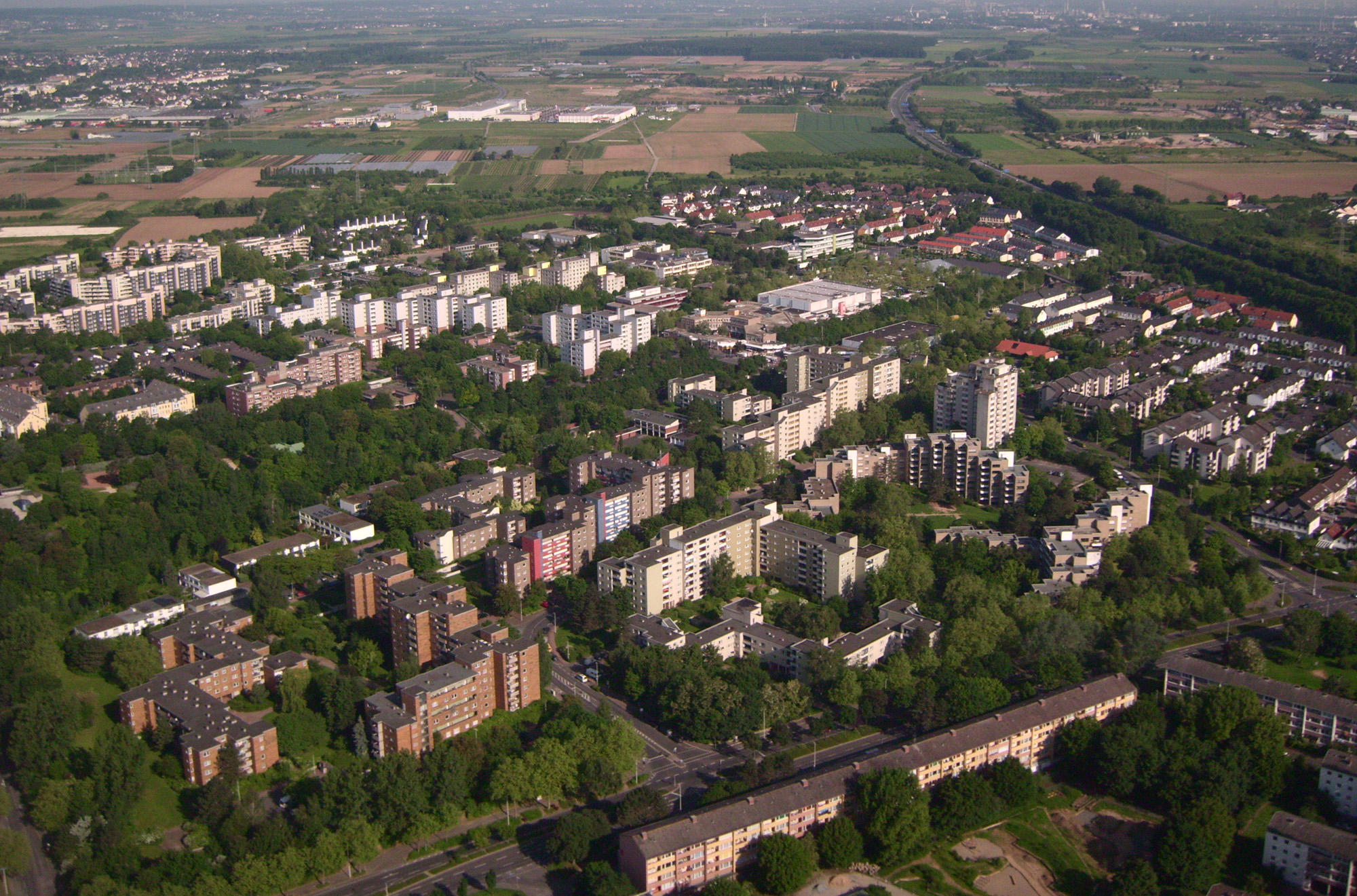
Neu-Tannenbusch

Neu-Tannenbusch was a planned large housing estate (satellite town), built at the beginning of the 1970s in response to the then dominant housing shortage. The settlement follows the ideal of "modern living" at that time. As a consequence, Alt-Tannenbusch has pronounced living areas with dense land development, broad roads with many parking possibilities and a central garbage collection system, as well as a spatially separated shopping centre and social services. For the building of Neu-Tannenbusch the route of the Rhine railway was shifted several kilometers and led in a cut by the new settlement. Today the Bonn suburban tram lines 63/16 serve the area. Neu-Tannenbusch with its 9,800 inhabitants is considered a social hot spot.
