= Bergisches Land =

Mountain range in Germany

Coordinates: 51°03′00″N 7°18′25″E

Bergisches Land, North Rhine-Westphalia, Germany

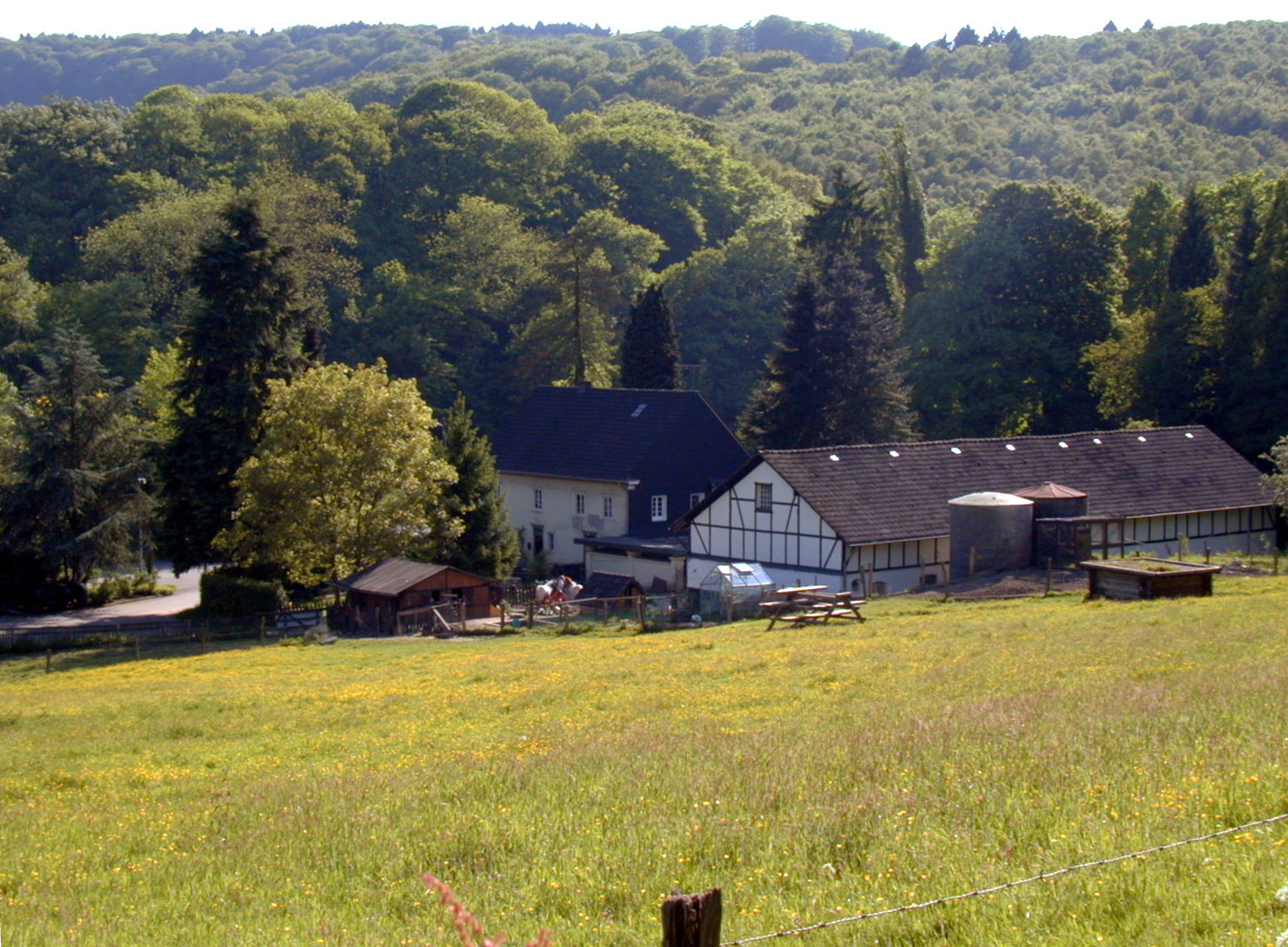
View of the woods of Burg with a typical Bergisches farmhouse

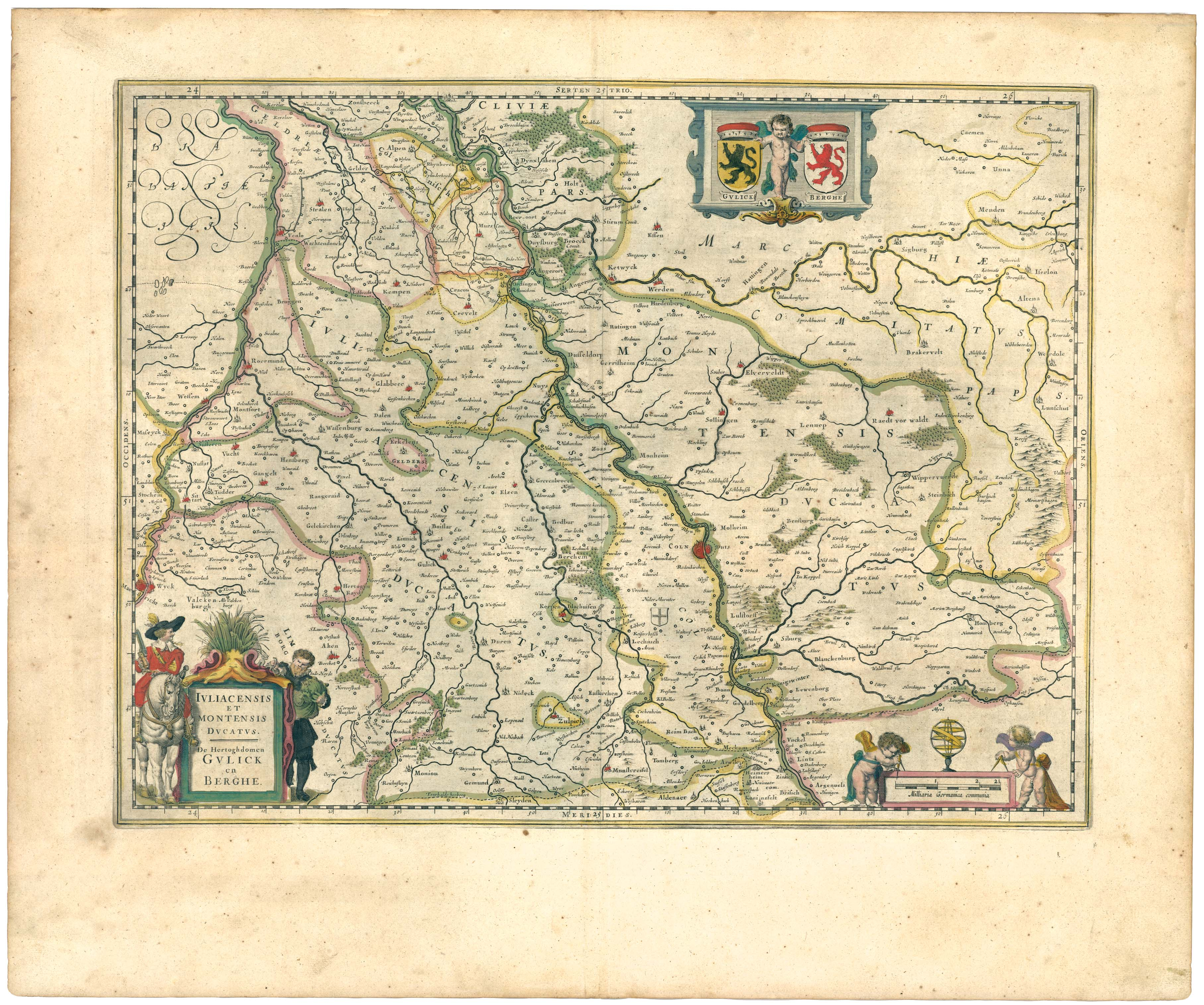
Iuliacensis et Montensis Ducatus, 1645, by Blaeu

The Bergisches Land (German pronunciation: [ˈbɛʁɡɪʃəs ˈlant], lit. 'Bergian Land') is a low mountain range in the state of North Rhine-Westphalia, Germany, east of the Rhine and south of the Ruhr. The landscape is shaped by forests, meadows, rivers and creeks and contains over twenty artificial lakes. Wuppertal is the biggest town, while the southern part has economic and socio-cultural ties to Cologne. Wuppertal and the neighbouring cities of Remscheid and Solingen form the Bergisches Städtedreieck (Berg City Triangle).

== Geography ==
=== Demarcation ===
==== Historically ====
The Bergisches Land emerged from the historic Duchy of Berg. The region also owes its name to the former sovereigns, the Counts (and later Dukes) of the House of Berg. The adjectival Latin term terre Montensis, i.e. of the Bergisches Land, was first recorded in writing in a Bergisch office constitution in 1363, although terra de Monte or Land von Berg appeared in earlier documents.

Important places in the duchy were Gerresheim, Elberfeld, Solingen, Lennep, Radevormwald, Wipperfürth, Bensberg, Siegburg and Blankenberg, most of which received city rights from the 13th century. The seat of the counts and dukes was initially Berge Castle in Altenberg near Odenthal, after the construction of Burg Castle the town of Burg an der Wupper (today a district of Solingen) and then from 1386 to 1822 Düsseldorf, which the dukes became a representative residence - and expanded the capital of the Duchy. The Bergisch lion in Düsseldorf's coat of arms still points to the historical affiliation of Düsseldorf to the Bergisches Land.

The northern parts of the Bergisches Land included the cities of Mülheim an der Ruhr, parts of Duisburg, Essen and Oberhausen (Alstaden and Dümpten), and the areas on the western border also included the area on the right bank of the Rhine, Cologne near Mülheim. Smaller areas on the left bank of the Rhine belonging to the duchy were also Wesseling, Rodenkirchen, Orr and Langel

The former lordships of Gimborn and Homburg in today's Oberberg district, on the other hand, were only added to the Grand Duchy of Berg during Napoleon's time. This originally non-Bergisch area includes Marienheide, Wiehl, Nümbrecht, the town of Bergneustadt and today's district seat of the Oberbergischer district: Gummersbach.

==== Geographically ====
The natural region Bergisches Land lies almost entirely in the main unit group Süder Uplands, which also includes almost the entire Sauerland. The Süder Uplands represent the north-eastern part of the Rhenish Massif on the right bank of the Rhine.

Natural orographic borders form the Ruhr in the north, the Rhine in the west and the Sieg in the south. To the east it merges into the Sauerland without a recognizable scenic border. Political and cultural differences alone determine the course of the border between the two historical landscapes, which, however, roughly corresponds to the eastern watersheds of Wupper and Agger, while the (western) Sauerland is mainly drained by the Ruhr and its tributaries.

The largest part of the Bergisches Land is characterized by a varied low mountain range landscape with forests, meadows and hills as well as narrow notch valleys also called Siepen with small streams. Except for the areas that transition into the Sauerland, the Bergisches Land is referred to as peneplain due to the advanced erosion of the mountains.

Westwards from the low mountain range, across various Bergische Heideterrasses, a plain without significant elevations, which is highly sprawled by the urban agglomerations of Cologne and Düsseldorf and - compared to the low mountain range landscape - is very little structured. Here, with a few heath relics, such as the Wahn Heath, Hilden Heath and Ohligs Heath, the spacious forest area Königsforst and individual quarry lakes, such as Lake Unterbach or the Elbsee, valuable nature reserves and recreation areas for the inhabitants of the surrounding cities.

The Nature Park Bergisches Land also defines the area as a recreational area. Although the proportion of forest is quite large, there are only a few larger contiguous forest areas. Forested mountain ranges in long waves and meadow valleys characterize the landscape. To the east, the proportion of forest landscape increases due to the unfavorable weather conditions for agriculture associated with the altitude. Naturally, mainly beech forests and beech-oak forests would grow on the hillsides. However, since the considerable deforestation in the early modern period, large areas have been reforested with spruce, which was not native to the region. The Nutscheid on the southern edge of the Bergisches Land is one of the largest forest areas and largely uninhabited. Another large forest area is the Heckenberg Forrest between Engelskirchen, Drabenderhöhe and Overath-Federath.

==== Modern definitions ====
Today, the Bergisches Land corresponds to the "Bergisches Land low mountain range region". In the formerly Bergisch Rhine and Ruhr cities (Düsseldorf, southern districts of Oberhausen, Duisburg-South and Mülheim an der Ruhr), the population's historical affiliation with the Bergisch region is hardly still present. In these places, people mostly see themselves as Rhinelanders or belonging to the Ruhr area. Above the Rhine plain, however, people take their affiliation to the Bergisches Land for granted. In the news of WDR, only the eastern areas are referred to as "Bergisches Land", whereas the western ones are counted as part of the unclearly circumscribed "Rhineland". The Mettmann district is also included in the cultural region Bergisches Land. The Bergisches Land cultural region includes the cities of Wuppertal, Remscheid, Solingen and the districts of Mettmann, Oberberg and Rhein-Berg. In addition to the cities of Wuppertal, Remscheid and Solingen, as well as the Rheinisch-Bergisch and Oberbergisch districts, the Mettmann district belongs to the Bergisches Land cultural region.

The capital of the Bergisches Land is usually no longer seen as the historic capital Düsseldorf, but rather as the city Wuppertal, which was created in 1929 and forms the economic, cultural and industrial center of the eastern Bergisches Land. However, the south of the region has now developed a stronger connection to Cologne.

Even in those districts of Cologne on the right bank of the Rhine that are historically and geographically part of the Bergisches Land, it can be seen that there is hardly any sense of belonging to the Bergisches Land, and that the inhabitants of these districts almost exclusively see themselves as Rhinelanders. An exception is the Rath/Heumar district of Cologne, which arose in the course of the Regional Reform in North Rhine-Westphalia and borders on Bergisch Gladbach and Rösrath, which according to the prevailing regional awareness is part of the Bergisches Land region. The long-established population in particular has a very strong sense of belonging to the Bergisches Land.

== History ==
Bergisches Land used to be territory of the County of Berg, which later became the Duchy of Berg, who gave the region its name. The Duchy was dissolved in 1815 and in 1822 the region became part of the Prussian Rhine Province.

Amongst the population today, a sense of belonging to the region Bergisches Land is notable in the hilly northern part, but not so much anymore in the areas near the Cologne Lowland, the Ruhr area or the city of Düsseldorf.

=== Economic upswing ===
The region became famous during the period of its early industrialisation in the 19th century. At that time Wupper Valley was a historical Silicon Valley. Its twin cities Barmen and Elberfeld were the trading- and industrial capitals of Prussia at that time. This economic upswing caused the expansion of the Ruhr as coal-mining area and gave birth to research on, and the theoretical underlining of social entrepreneurship and socialism: Friedrich Engels was born in Barmen to a textile mill owner.

After the industrial downturn from the 1960s on, the region lost importance but cooperations by Bergisches Land entrepreneurs, active citizens and politicians are bringing back some regional awareness and economic power.

== Cities and districts ==
City/district	affiliation	Part of the dukedom Berg (1789)	Part of the Bergisches Land in local awareness
Bad Honnef	Rhein-Sieg-Kreis	X	
Bergisch Gladbach	Rheinisch-Bergischer Kreis	X	X
Bergneustadt	Oberbergischer Kreis	X	X
Burscheid	Rheinisch-Bergischer Kreis	X	X
Düsseldorf	no affiliation	X	
Eitorf	Rhein-Sieg-Kreis	X	X
Engelskirchen	Oberbergischer Kreis	X	X
Erkrath	Kreis Mettmann	X	X
Gummersbach	Oberbergischer Kreis		X
Haan	Kreis Mettmann	X	X
Heiligenhaus	Kreis Mettmann	X	X
Hennef	Rhein-Sieg-Kreis	X	X
Hilden	Kreis Mettmann	X	X
Hückeswagen	Oberbergischer Kreis	X	X
Kürten	Rheinisch-Bergischer Kreis	X	X
Langenfeld	Kreis Mettmann	X	X
Leichlingen	Rheinisch-Bergischer Kreis	X	X
Leverkusen	no affiliation	X	X
Lindlar	Oberbergischer Kreis	X	X
Lohmar	Rhein-Sieg-Kreis	X	X
Marienheide	Oberbergischer Kreis		X
Mettmann	Kreis Mettmann	X	X
Monheim	Kreis Mettmann	X	X
Morsbach	Oberbergischer Kreis	X	X
Much	Rhein-Sieg-Kreis	X	X
Mülheim an der Ruhr	no affiliation	X	
Neunkirchen-Seelscheid	Rhein-Sieg-Kreis	X	X
Niederkassel	Rhein-Sieg-Kreis	X	
Nümbrecht	Oberbergischer Kreis		X
Odenthal	Rheinisch-Bergischer Kreis	X	X
Overath	Rheinisch-Bergischer Kreis	X	X
Ratingen	Kreis Mettmann	X	X
Radevormwald	Oberbergischer Kreis	X	X
Reichshof	Oberbergischer Kreis	X	X
Remscheid	no affiliation	X	X
Rösrath	Rheinisch-Bergischer Kreis	X	X
Ruppichteroth	Rhein-Sieg-Kreis	X	X
Sankt Augustin	Rhein-Sieg-Kreis	X	
Siegburg	Rhein-Sieg-Kreis	X	
Solingen	no affiliation	X	X
Troisdorf	Rhein-Sieg-Kreis	X	
Velbert	Kreis Mettmann	X	X
Waldbröl	Oberbergischer Kreis	X	X
Wermelskirchen	Rheinisch-Bergischer Kreis	X	X
Wiehl	Oberbergischer Kreis		X
Windeck	Rhein-Sieg-Kreis	X	X
Wipperfürth	Oberbergischer Kreis	X	X
Wülfrath	Kreis Mettmann	X	X
Wuppertal	no affiliation	X	X

== See also ==
- Bergische Museumsbahnen
- Bergisch-Märkische Railway Company
- Rhineland
- Berg house
- Bergish dialects
