= Auelsbach =

River in Germany

Location
- Country: Germany
- State: North Rhine-Westphalia

Physical characteristics
- Mouth
  - location: Agger
  - coordinates: 50.8400°N 7.2004°E
- Length: 7.417 km (4.609 mi)

Basin features
- Progression: Agger→ Sieg→ Rhine→ North Sea
- Tributaries
  - left: Holzbach

Auelsbach (German pronunciation: [ˈaʊəlsbax]) is a river of North Rhine-Westphalia, Germany. It flows into the Agger in Lohmar.

== See also ==
- List of rivers of North Rhine-Westphalia
