= Leppe =

River in Germany

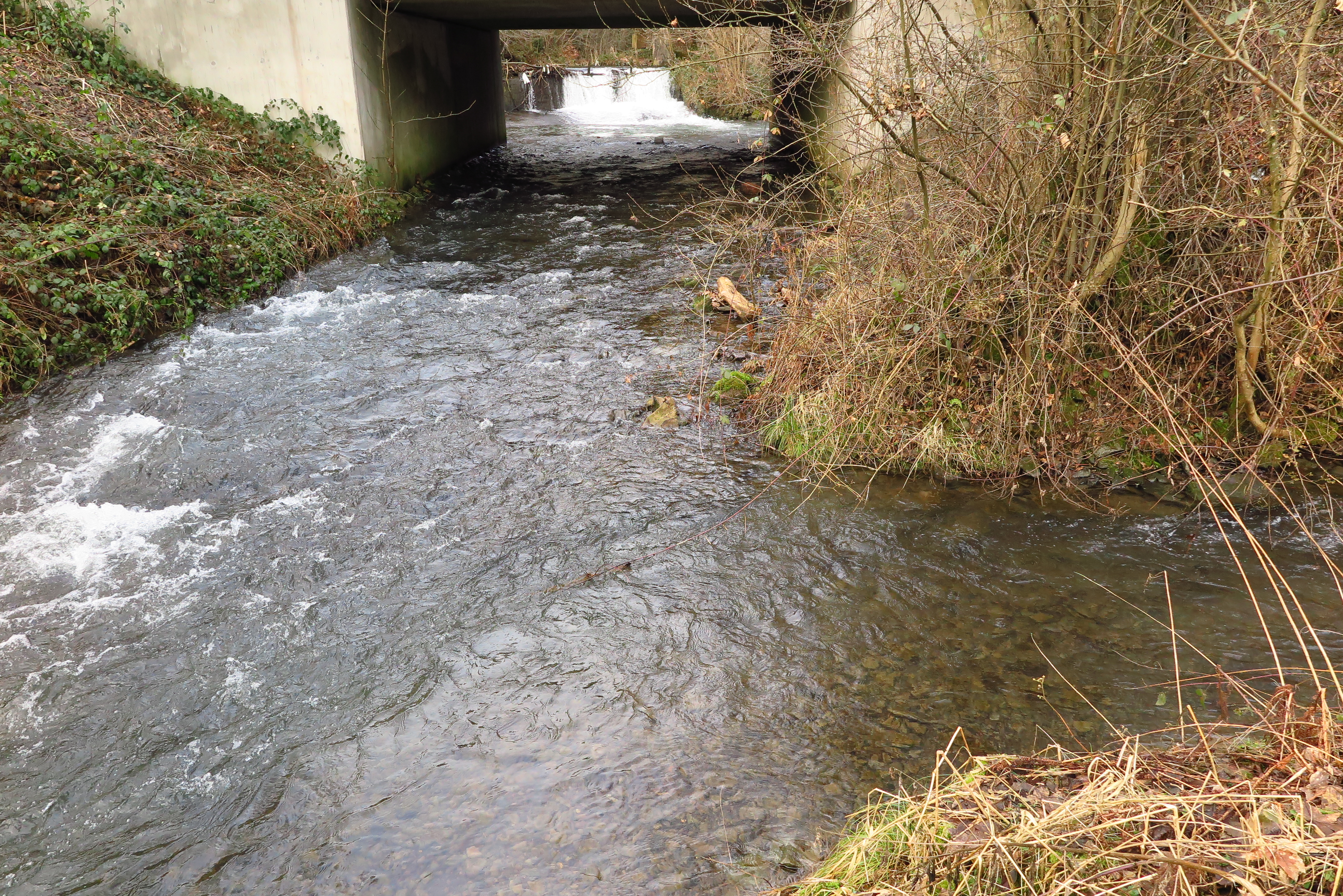

Location
- Country: Germany
- State: North Rhine-Westphalia

Physical characteristics
- Mouth
  - location: Agger
  - coordinates: 50.9872°N 7.4068°E
- Length: 19.4 km (12.1 mi)

Basin features
- Progression: Agger→ Sieg→ Rhine→ North Sea

Leppe (German pronunciation: [ˈlɛpə]) is a river of North Rhine-Westphalia, Germany. It flows into the Agger in Engelskirchen.

== See also ==
- List of rivers of North Rhine-Westphalia
- List of rivers in Germany
