= Wiehl (Agger) =

River in Germany

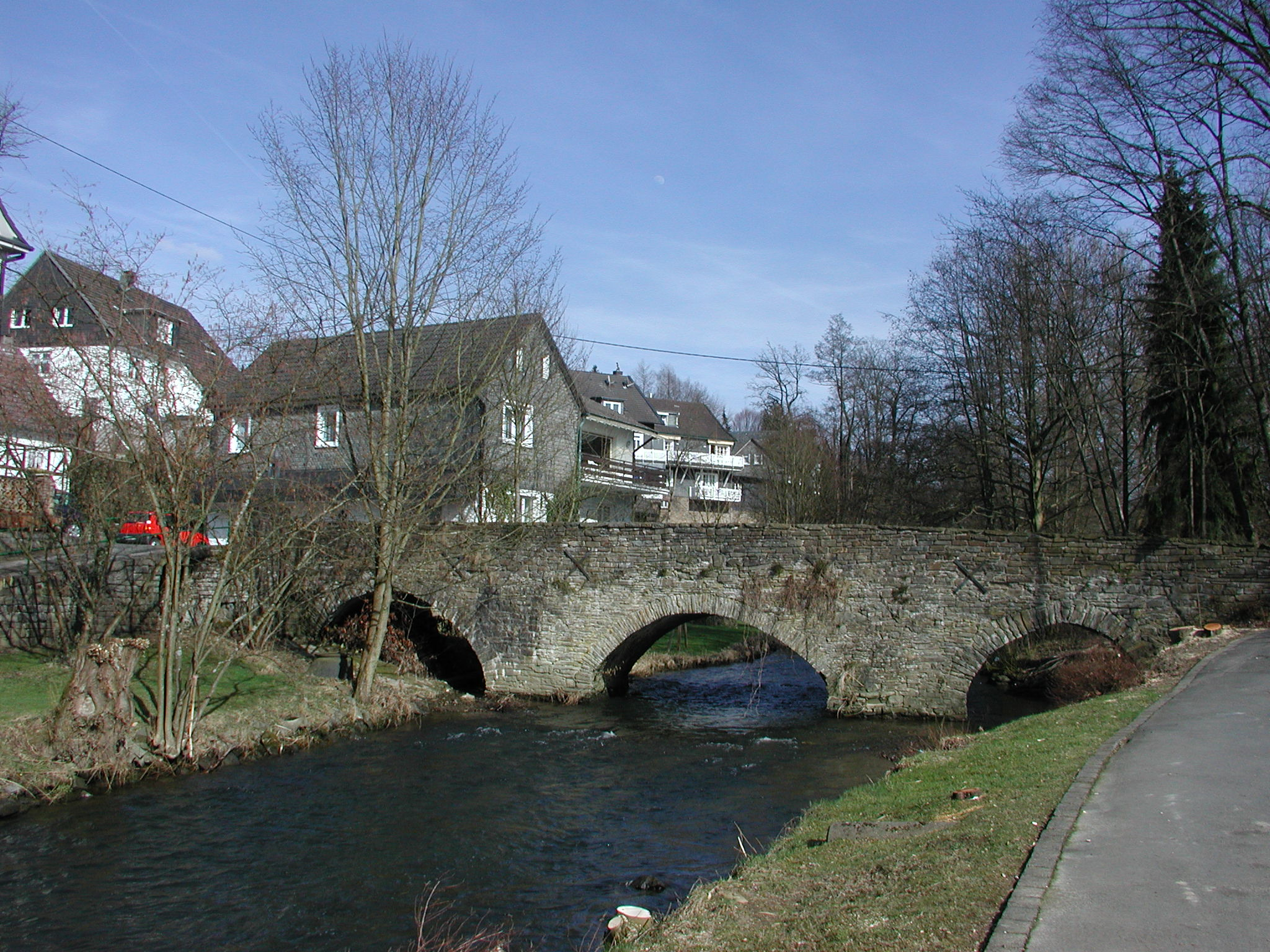
- The Wiehl by the Mill Bridge (Mühlenbrücke) in the municipality of Wiehl

Location
- Country: Germany
- State: North Rhine-Westphalia
- Reference no.: DE: 27284

Physical characteristics
- Source
  - location: north of Hahn
  - coordinates: 50°58′34.28″N 7°45′50.60″E
  - elevation: 433 m above sea level (NHN)
- Mouth
  - location: near Wiehlmünden into the Agger
  - coordinates: 50°59′15″N 7°28′54″E
  - elevation: 145 m above sea level (NHN)
- Length: 33.6 km (20.9 mi)
- Basin size: 140.721 km^{2} (54.333 sq mi)

Basin features
- Progression: Agger→ Sieg→ Rhine→ North Sea
- Landmarks: Large towns: Wiehl

The Wiehl (German pronunciation: [viːl]) is a 33.6-kilometre-long, orographically left tributary of the River Agger in the German state of North Rhine-Westphalia. It is the longest river situated entirely within the county of Oberbergischer Kreis and the third longest tributary of the Agger.

== Geography ==
The river rises in the region of Bergisches Land in the municipality of Reichshof. Its source is located about 700 metres north of the village of Hahn on the southern slopes of the Silberkuhle (514.6 m) at a height of 446 m above sea level (NHN). The Wiehl initially flows in a southerly direction and passes through the parish of Wiehl. Near Wildbergerhütte it turns towards the west. Between Nespen and Brüchermühle it is impounded by the Wiehl Dam. After passing Brüchermühle it is impounded again, this time by the Stauweiher Bieberstein. From here it flows mainly in a northwesterly direction. After passing through the parishes of Oberwiehl, Wiehl, Bielstein and Weiershagen, it empties into the Agger near Wiehlmünden at a height of 145 m above NHN.

=== Tributaries ===
The following is a list of Wiehl tributaries with their orographic orientation (left/right), location of their mouth and elevation at the mouth.

- Aubach (left) near Wildbergerhütte at 309 m above NHN
- Hamerter Bach (right) near Hamert at 304 m above NHN
- Dreschhauser Bach (right) after Nespen into the Wiehl Reservoir at 292 m above NHN
- Streesharthbach (left) into a forebay of the Wiehl Reservoir at 304 m above NHN
- Asbach (left) near Brüchermühle at 228 m above NHN
- Heisterbach (right) before Oberwiehl at 198 m above NHN
- Dreisbach (right) near Oberwiehl at 194 m above NHN
- Oberholzener Bach (right) before Wiehl at 191 m above NHN
- Mottelbach (left) near Wiehl at 184 m above NHN
- Alpebach (right) after Wiehl at 174 m above NHN
- Ülpebach (left) near Bielstein at 163 m above NHN
- Molbach (left) before Wielmünden at 146 m above NHN

== Flooding ==
On 3 May 2001, following torrential rain, what were described as hundred-year floods washed away parts of some roads. Between 4 and 8 pm, 110 litres of rain fell per square metre. The average monthly precipitation in North Rhine-Westphalia is only 100 litres.

== See also ==
- List of rivers of North Rhine-Westphalia
