= Neunkirchen-Seelscheid =

- Municipality
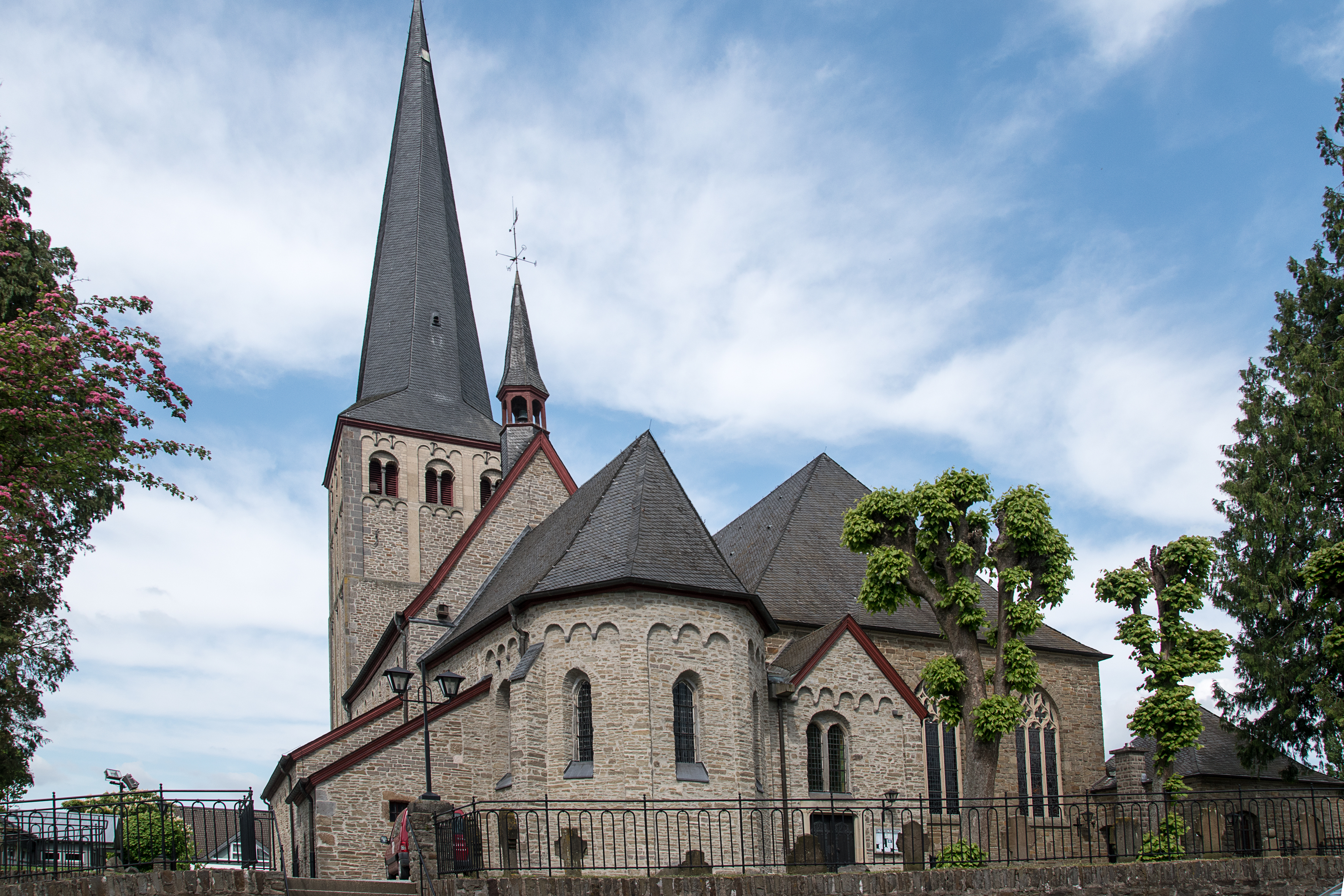
- St. Margareta (Neunkirchen)

- Coat of arms

- Location of Neunkirchen-Seelscheid within Rhein-Sieg-Kreis district
- Interactive map of Neunkirchen-Seelscheid
- Location within Germany Location within North Rhine-Westphalia
- Coordinates: 50°52′N 07°20′E
- Country: Germany
- State: North Rhine-Westphalia
- Admin. region: Köln
- District: Rhein-Sieg-Kreis
- Subdivisions: 59

Government
  - Mayor (2025–30): Guido Vierkötter (CDU)

Area
  - Total: 50.62 km^{2} (19.54 sq mi)
- Elevation: 220 m (720 ft)

Population (2025-12-31)
  - Total: 20,321
  - Density: 401.4/km^{2} (1,040/sq mi)
- Time zone: UTC+01:00 (CET)
  - Summer (DST): UTC+02:00 (CEST)
- Postal codes: 53819
- Dialling codes: 02247
- Vehicle registration: SU
- Website: www.nk-se.de

Neunkirchen-Seelscheid (German pronunciation: [ˈnɔʏnkɪʁçn̩ ˈzeːlʃaɪt]; Kölsch: Nüngkirche-Seelscheidt) is a municipality in the Rhein-Sieg district in the southern part of North Rhine-Westphalia, Germany. Beside the two principal places Neunkirchen and Seelscheid there are numerous smaller localities among the municipality.

== Geography ==
Neunkirchen-Seelscheid is located 20 km north-east of Bonn and 25 km south-east from Cologne in the southern part of the region of Berg (Bergisches Land). The northwest municipality border is formed by the river course of the Naafbach, while the Bröl acts as the southeast border. The Wahnbach flows through the municipality.

== Neighbour municipalities ==
Neighbouring cities are Siegburg, Hennef, Overath and Lohmar. Neighbouring municipalities are Much and Ruppichteroth.

== Subdivisions ==
Beside the two principal places Neunkirchen (5423) and Seelscheid (5788) there are following localities within the municipality (population between brackets)

Balensiefen (20), Birken (58), Birkenfeld (174), Birkenmühle (5), Brackemich (106), Breiderheide (3), Breitscheid, Bruchhausen (59), Busch (14), Effert (2), Eich (101), Eischeid (508), Gutmühle (39), Hardt (43), Hasenbach (315), Hausen, Hausermühle (71), Heidgen, Heister (110), Herkenrath (137), Hermerath (342), Hermerather Mühle, Herrenwiesermühle, Hochhausen (397), Hohn (101), Höfferhof, Hülscheid (418), Ingersau (62), Ingersaueler Mühle (6), Kaule (37), Kotthausen, Köbach (112), Krahwinkel (200), Meisenbach, Mohlscheid (383), Nackhausen (319), Niederhorbach (164), Niederwennerscheid (507), Oberdorst (364), Oberheister (413), Oberhorbach (64), Oberste Zeith, Oberwennerscheid (432), Ohlig (10), Ohmerath (31), Pinn (45), Pixhof, Pohlhausen (492), Rehwiese (6), Remschoß (254), Rengert (222), Renzert (64), Rippert (128), Schaaren, Scherpekotten (2), Scherpemich, Schöneshof (454), Siefen (34), Söntgerath (134), Stein (125), Steinermühle (19), Straßen (84), Unterste Zeith, Wahlen (22), Wahn (197), Weiert (32), Wende (4), Weesbach, Wiescheid, Wolperath (1288)

== Population ==
Historical population

Year	Pop.	±% p.a.
1965	7,507	—
1970	10,051	+6.01%
1975	12,961	+5.22%
1980	15,040	+3.02%
1985	16,385	+1.73%
1990	16,860	+0.57%
1995	18,508	+1.88%

Year	Pop.	±% p.a.
2000	20,079	+1.64%
2005	21,000	+0.90%
2010	20,634	−0.35%
2015	19,862	−0.76%
2020	19,698	−0.17%
2025	20,321	+0.62%

Source: Landesdatabank Nordrhein-Westfalen

== History ==
- ca. 5000 BC - first remains of human settlement
- 1178 - first documentary mention
- 1969 Neunkirchen-Seelscheid were made of the two old municipalities Neunkirchen and Seelscheid

== Politics ==
The 40 seats of the municipal council are distributed as follows since the September 2020 elections:

- CDU - 16 seats
- SPD - 11 seats
- The Greens - 9 seats
- FDP - 2 seats
- Wir für Neunkirchen-Seelscheid - 1 seat
- Demokratie durch Volksabstimmung - 1 seat

== Twin towns ==
- Bicester, Oxfordshire in Great Britain
- Les Essarts, Vendée in France
- Czernichów in Poland

== Notable people ==
- Andreas Pinkwart (born 1960), German politician (FDP)
