= Loopebach =

River in Germany

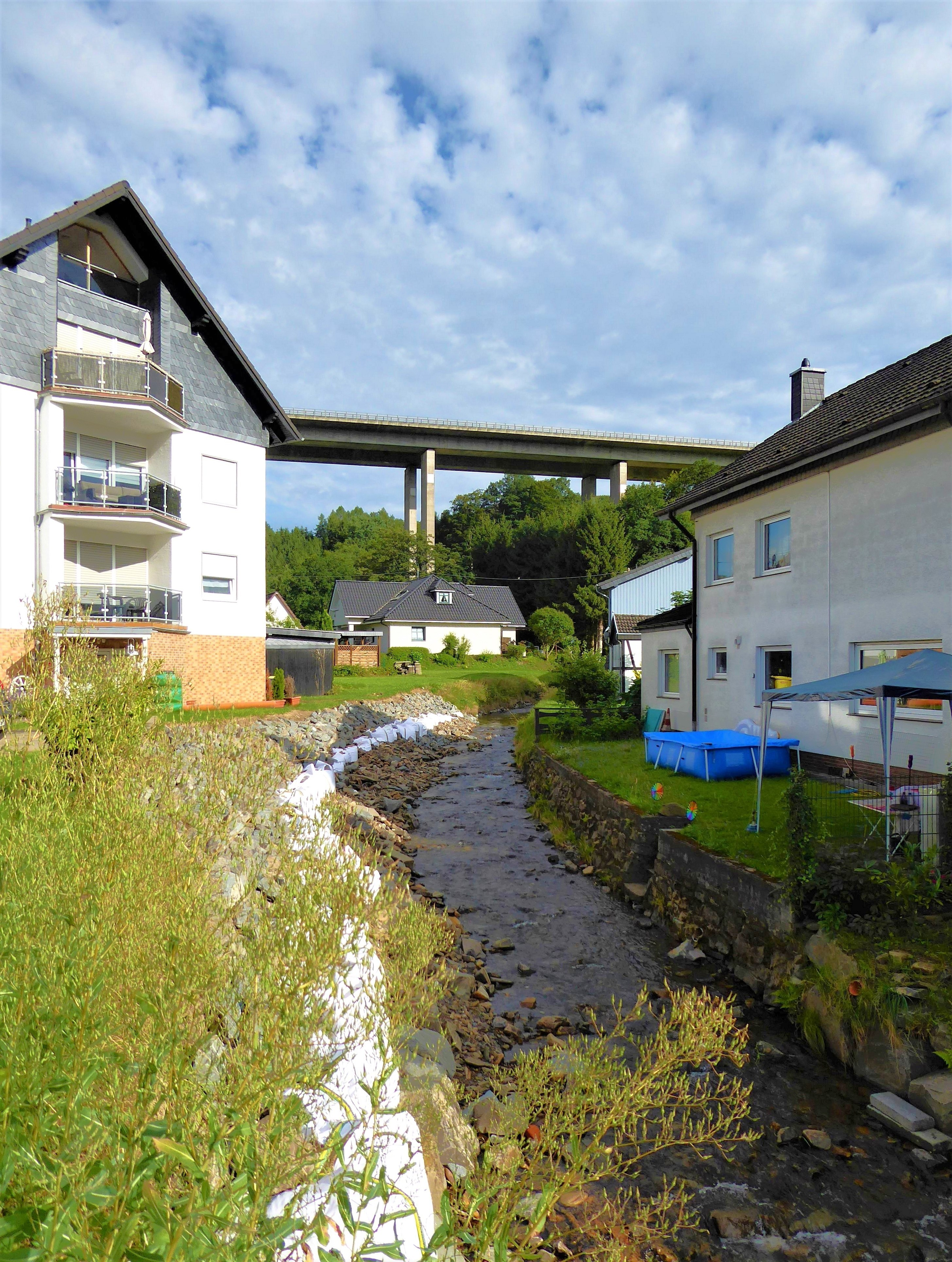

Location
- Country: Germany
- States: North Rhine-Westphalia

Physical characteristics
- Mouth
  - location: Agger
  - coordinates: 50.9763°N 7.3697°E

Basin features
- Progression: Agger→ Sieg→ Rhine→ North Sea

Loopebach (German pronunciation: [ˈloːpəbax]) is a small river of North Rhine-Westphalia, Germany. It is 7.7 km long and flows into the Agger as a left tributary near Engelskirchen.

== See also ==
- List of rivers of North Rhine-Westphalia
