= Schlingenbach =

River in Germany

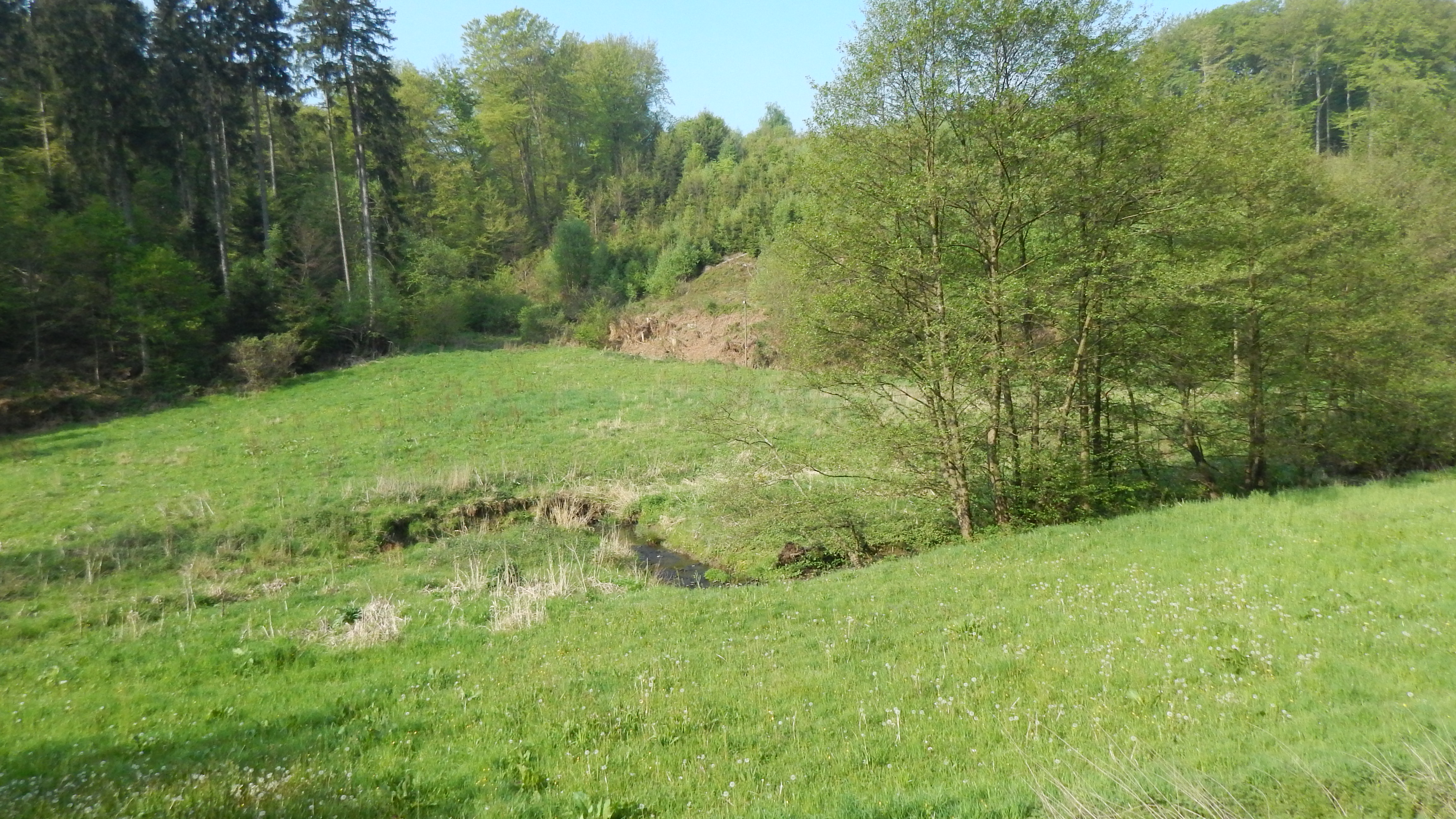

Location
- Country: Germany
- States: North Rhine-Westphalia

Physical characteristics
- Mouth
  - location: Agger
  - coordinates: 50.9599°N 7.3242°E

Basin features
- Progression: Agger→ Sieg→ Rhine→ North Sea

Schlingenbach (German pronunciation: [ˈʃlɪŋənbax]) is a small river of North Rhine-Westphalia, Germany. It is 6.6 km (4.1 mi) long and flows as a left tributary into the Agger near Overath.

== See also ==
- List of rivers of North Rhine-Westphalia
