= Rengse =

River in Germany

Location
- Country: Germany
- States: North Rhine-Westphalia

Physical characteristics
- Mouth
  - location: Agger
  - coordinates: 51.042°N 7.636°E

Basin features
- Progression: Agger→ Sieg→ Rhine→ North Sea

Rengse (German pronunciation: [ˈʁɛŋzə]) is a small river of North Rhine-Westphalia, Germany. It is 5.6 km (3.5 mi) long and flows as a left tributary into the Agger near Bergneustadt.

== See also ==
- List of rivers of North Rhine-Westphalia
