= Genkel =

River in Germany

Location
- Country: Germany
- States: North Rhine-Westphalia

Physical characteristics
- Mouth
  - location: Agger
  - coordinates: 51.038°N 7.631°E

Basin features
- Progression: Agger→ Sieg→ Rhine→ North Sea

Genkel (German pronunciation: [ˈɡɛŋkl̩]) is a river of North Rhine-Westphalia, Germany. It is 7.1 km long and flows into the Agger reservoir near Bergneustadt.

== See also ==
- List of rivers of North Rhine-Westphalia
