= Jabach =

River in Germany

Location
- Country: Germany
- State: North Rhine-Westphalia

Physical characteristics
- Mouth
  - location: Agger
  - coordinates: 50.8499°N 7.2126°E
- Length: 7.8 km (4.8 mi)

Basin features
- Progression: Agger→ Sieg→ Rhine→ North Sea

Jabach (German pronunciation: [ˈjaːbax]) is a river of North Rhine-Westphalia, Germany. It flows into the Agger near Lohmar.

== See also ==
- List of rivers of North Rhine-Westphalia
