= Rospebach =

River in Germany

Location
- Country: Germany
- States: North Rhine-Westphalia

Physical characteristics
- Source
  - coordinates: 51.0440°N 7.5303°E
- Mouth
  - location: Agger
  - coordinates: 50.9885°N 7.5526°E

Basin features
- Progression: Agger→ Sieg→ Rhine→ North Sea

Rospebach (German pronunciation: [ˈʁɔspəbax]) is a river in North Rhine-Westphalia, Germany. It is 7.8 km (4.85 mi) long and flows into the Agger river near Gummersbach.

== Name ==
The river was first mentioned in writing in 1575 as "Rooßbach," while the town of Rospe appeared in documents as Rosepe as early as 1150.

== Geography ==
The source of Rospebach is on the southern slope of the Arzhöhe, about 800 meters southeast of Gummersbach district of Herreshagen at an altitude of 317 meters above sea level. From here, it flows primarily south through Wasserfuhr, Gummersbach, and Mühle before reaching 168 meters above sea level near Vollmerhausen, joining the Agger. On its way from source to mouth, the Rospebach overcomes 149 meters in altitude, corresponding to an average bed slope of 18.2%.

== Environment ==
According to the study led by the Ministry for the Environment and Nature Conservation, Agriculture and Consumer Protection of the State of North Rhine-Westphalia, the Rospebach predominately has a water quality of 2. This means that the stream is considered to be moderately polluted over long stretches. The river's structural quality is assigned to structural quality classes 6 and 7 for more than 70% of the river's course. The course of the river is greatly altered to 38% completely.

After a distance of roughly 1 km, the stream reaches the Wasserfuhr district. From here, the course of the river is accompanied by traffic routes: in the town itself by district road 42, behind Wasserfuhr from the north there is federal road 256 and on the eastern slope of the valley the Volmetalbahn. The federal highway and railway accompany the river to its mouth in the Agger.

== See also ==
- List of rivers of North Rhine-Westphalia
