= Walbach (Agger) =

River in Germany

Location
- Country: Germany
- State: North Rhine-Westphalia

Physical characteristics
- Mouth
  - location: Agger
  - coordinates: 50.9872°N 7.4548°E

Basin features
- Progression: Agger→ Sieg→ Rhine→ North Sea

Walbach is a river of North Rhine-Westphalia, Germany. It is 5.1 km (3.2 mi) long and is a right tributary of the Agger.

== See also ==
- List of rivers of North Rhine-Westphalia
