= Naafbach =

River in Germany

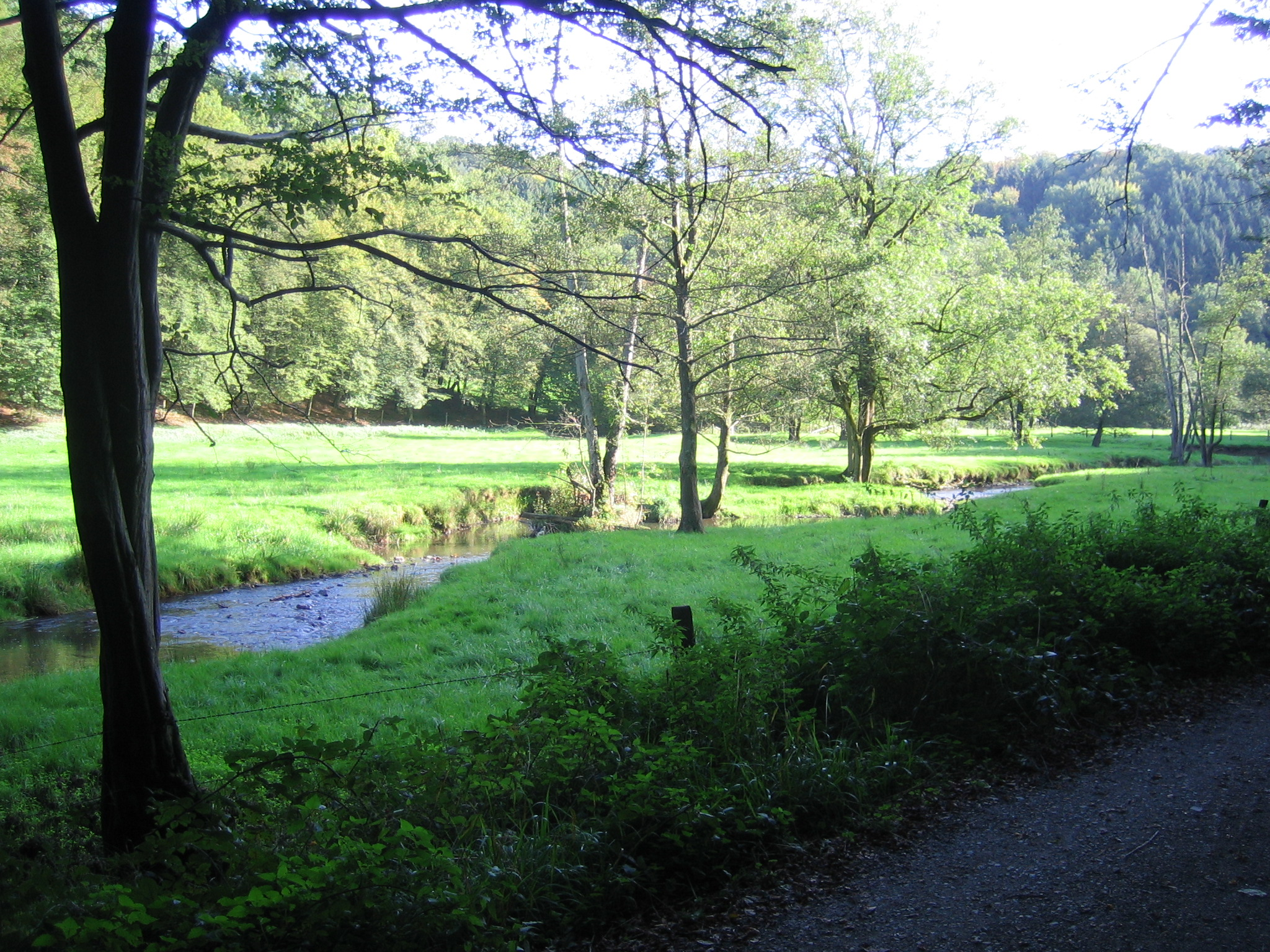

Location
- Country: Germany
- State: North Rhine-Westphalia

Physical characteristics
- Mouth
  - location: Agger
  - coordinates: 50°51′55″N 7°14′21″E
- Length: 22.7 km (14.1 mi)

Basin features
- Progression: Agger→ Sieg→ Rhine→ North Sea

Naafbach (German pronunciation: [ˈnaːfbax]) is a river of North Rhine-Westphalia, Germany. It flows into the Agger near Lohmar.

== See also ==
- List of rivers of North Rhine-Westphalia
