= Strombach =

Strombach may refer to:

- David Štrombach (born 1996), Czech football player
- Strombach (Agger), a river of North Rhine-Westphalia, Germany, tributary of the Agger
- Strombach, a district of the town Gummersbach, North Rhine-Westphalia, Germany
