= Seßmarbach =

River in Germany

Location
- Country: Germany
- State: North Rhine-Westphalia

Physical characteristics
- Mouth
  - location: Agger
  - coordinates: 51.0034°N 7.5714°E

Basin features
- Progression: Agger→ Sieg→ Rhine→ North Sea

Seßmarbach is a river of North Rhine-Westphalia, Germany. It is 9 km (5.6 mi) long and flows as a right tributary into the Agger near Gummersbach.

== See also ==
- List of rivers of North Rhine-Westphalia
