= Siegburger Mühlengraben =

River in Germany

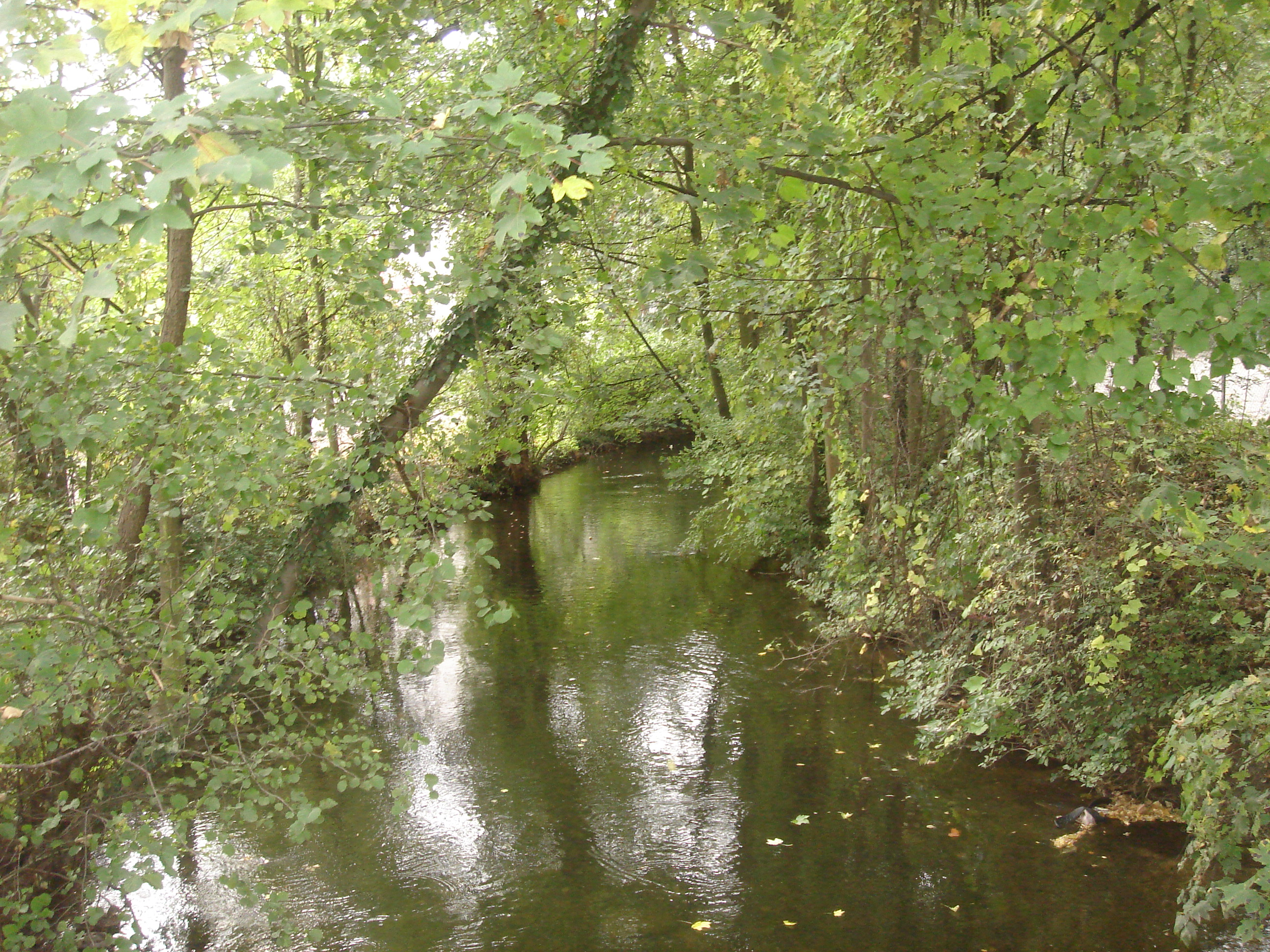
- The ditch Mühlengraben in Siegburg, Germany, near the Siegwerk

Specifications
- Length: 4.7 km (2.9 miles)

Geography
- Start point: Sieg (50.7889°N 7.2261°E)
- End point: Sieg (50.7993°N 7.1793°E)

Siegburger Mühlengraben is a small canal of North Rhine-Westphalia, Germany. It branches off the Sieg, flows through Siegburg, and joins the Sieg again.
