= Dörspe =

River in Germany

Location
- Country: Germany
- State: North Rhine-Westphalia

Physical characteristics
- Mouth
  - location: Agger
  - coordinates: 51.0073°N 7.6253°E
- Length: 11.7 km (7.3 mi)

Basin features
- Progression: Agger→ Sieg→ Rhine→ North Sea

Dörspe is a river of North Rhine-Westphalia, Germany. It flows into the Agger near Bergneustadt.

== See also ==
- List of rivers of North Rhine-Westphalia
