= Lombach =

Lombach may refer to:

- Lombach (Agger), a river of North Rhine-Westphalia, Germany
- Lombach (Aare), a river of Switzerland, near Unterseen, tributary of Lake Thun
