= Wiehl =

- Town
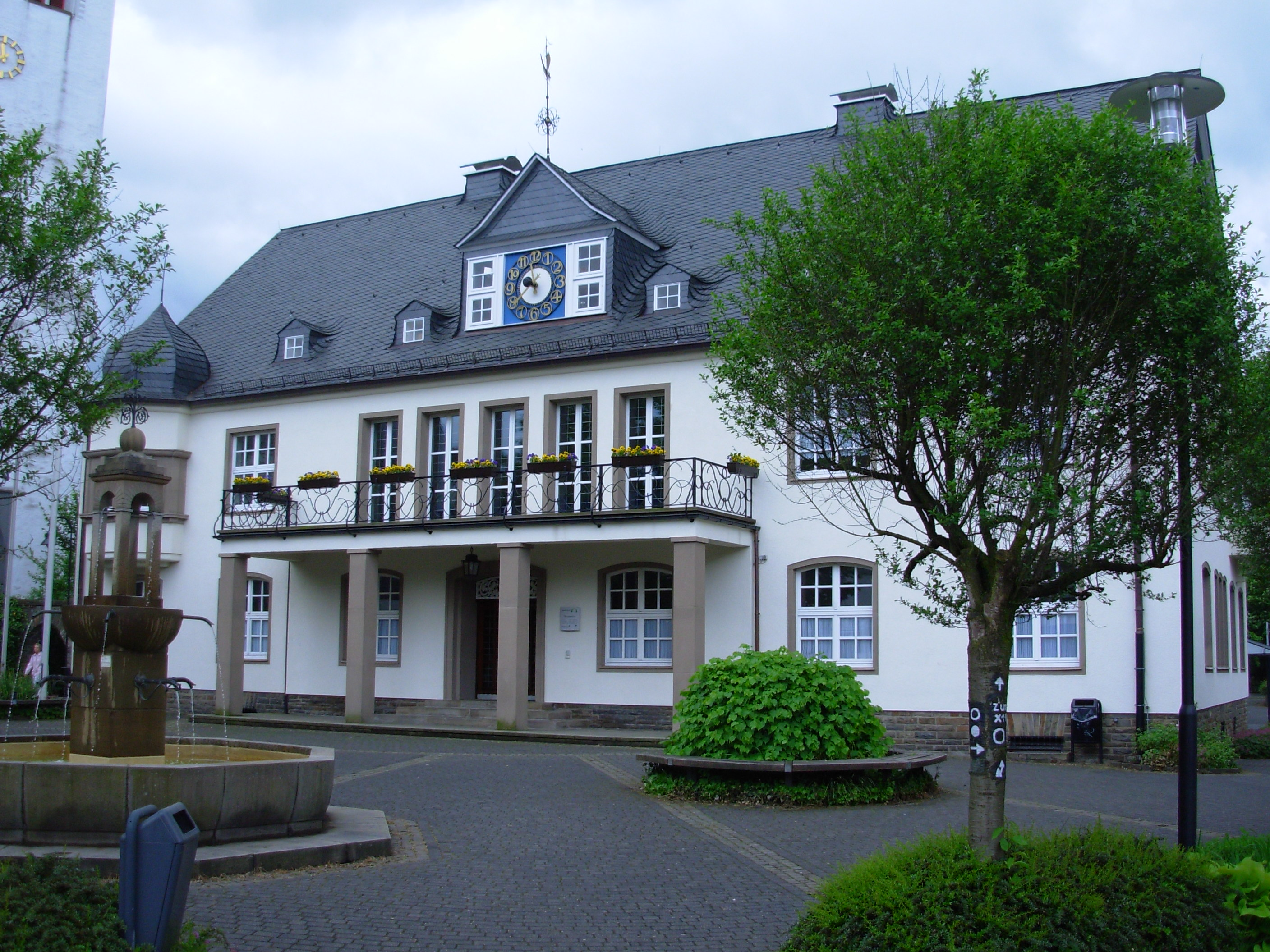
- Town hall

- Coat of arms

- Location of Wiehl within Oberbergischer Kreis district
- Interactive map of Wiehl
- Location within Germany Location within North Rhine-Westphalia
- Coordinates: 50°57′N 7°32′E
- Country: Germany
- State: North Rhine-Westphalia
- Admin. region: Köln
- District: Oberbergischer Kreis

Government
  - Mayor (2020–25): Ulrich Stücker (Ind.)

Area
  - Total: 53.26 km^{2} (20.56 sq mi)
- Elevation: 191 m (627 ft)

Population (2025-12-31)
  - Total: 25,213
  - Density: 473.4/km^{2} (1,226/sq mi)
- Time zone: UTC+01:00 (CET)
  - Summer (DST): UTC+02:00 (CEST)
- Postal codes: 51674
- Dialling codes: 02262
- Vehicle registration: GM
- Website: www.wiehl.de

Wiehl (German pronunciation: [viːl]) is a municipality in the Oberbergischer Kreis, in North Rhine-Westphalia, Germany. It is located approximately 41 km east of Cologne. The neighbouring municipalities Reichshof, Waldbröl, Nümbrecht, Much, Engelskirchen and Gummersbach border on the town.

== Geography ==
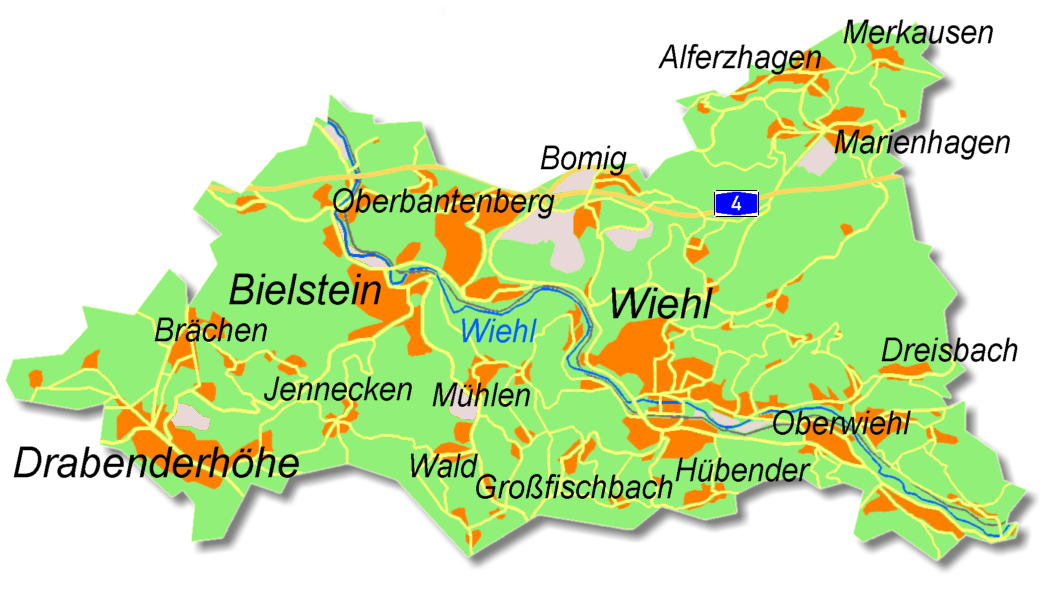
Map of Wiehl

Between the motorway A4 and Wiehl lies the biggest Wiehl industrial area, covering about 81 ha: Wiehl-Bomig. The river of the same name, Wiehl, flows by the town in an east–west direction.

=== Villages ===
- Alferzhagen
- Alpe
- Alperbrück
- Angfurten
- Bielstein
- Bieberstein
- Börnhausen
- Bomig
- Brächen
- Breidenbruch
- Büddelhagen
- Büttinghausen -
- Dahl
- Drabenderhöhe
- Dreisbach
- Drosselhardt
- Fahlenbruch
- Faulmert
- Forst
- Gassenhagen
- Großfischbach
- Hahn
- Hau
- Hengstenberg
- Hillerscheid
- Hübender
- Hückhausen
- Immen
- Jennecken
- Kleinfischbach
- Kurtensiefen
- Linden
- Marienhagen
- Merkausen
- Monsau
- Morkepütz
- Mühlen
- Mühlhausen
- Neuklef
- Niederbellinghausen
- Niederhof
- Oberbantenberg
- Oberholzen
- Oberwiehl
- Pfaffenberg
- Pergenroth
- Remperg
- Siefen
- Steinacker
- Verr
- Wald
- Weiershagen
- Wiehlsiefen

== History ==
Wiehl is first recorded in 1131 under the name of Wila. On the 1575 Mercator map it is shown as Wiell. Wiehl was eventually allocated in the 1604 Treaty of Siegburg to the Barony of Homburg and was subordinated with it to the House of Sayn-Wittgenstein. In 1815, the Congress of Vienna assigned the little Homburg territory, which practically only consisted of the municipalities of Wiehl and Nümbrecht, to Prussia. At that time, Wiehl was still an agriculturally oriented settlement with a village character. Those in the population who could not earn a living from the land had to serve as migratory labour. Not until the second half of the 19th century were the conditions created for a significant increase in population. In 1860, the water power of the River Wiehl was first utilised by the Ohler Hammer Mill; in 1895, the river was used to generate electricity; the place was connected to the railway network in 1897 and the BPW Bergische Achsen factory was founded in 1898. The Nazi era left Wiehl a new town hall (today called the "Old Town Hall"). After the Second World War Wiehl integrated the influx of refugees who had been bombed out or expelled. In the municipal reorganisation in 1969, it was combined with Bielstein and Drabenderhöhe and, in 1971, 840 years after its first record, it was granted town rights. Since that time it has grown steadily, partly through the arrival of immigrants and through policies encouraging the growth of industry.

German traditional electric wiring company Merten has it productions facility in Wiehl. Merten is part of Schneider Electric since 2006.

== Population ==
Historical population

Year	Pop.	±% p.a.
1965	16,027	—
1970	17,118	+1.33%
1975	19,004	+2.11%
1980	21,103	+2.12%
1985	21,676	+0.54%
1990	23,123	+1.30%
1995	25,367	+1.87%

Year	Pop.	±% p.a.
2000	26,448	+0.84%
2005	26,511	+0.05%
2010	25,645	−0.66%
2015	25,274	−0.29%
2020	25,199	−0.06%
2025	25,213	+0.01%

Source: Landesdatabank Nordrhein-Westfalen

== Coat of arms ==
The coat of arms served the power Homburg as a basis of today's Wiehler coat of arms. It consists of a two tower castle with open gate and portcullis. The unresolved Knight of St John of Jerusalem cross over the right lower tower was taken at the association of the municipalities of Wiehl and Bielstein from the Bielsteiner coat of arms.

== Leisure time ==
=== Sports ===
- Wiehltal stadium with little field (art lawn)
- Sports field Eichhardt
- Sports and gymnasia at the high school and the elementary school
- Solar open-air swimming pool with super slide
- Ice sports hall
- Sauna, undergoing a Kneipp cure plant
- Wiehlpark for leisure time, game and sports
- Walks in the Oberbergischen country

== Culture and sights ==
=== Buildings ===
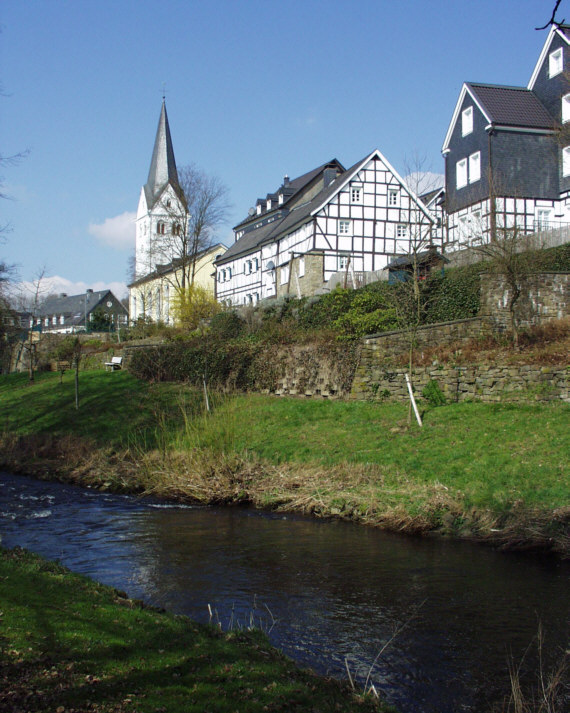
Ev. church Wiehl

- Protestant church and half-timbered houses restored form the town center. In the foreground the river Wiehl. The Protestant church in hugging as is the largest of the Wiehler churches. The oldest part has stood since the 11th century. The nave was rebuilt repeatedly. The belltower remained at its place. The baptismal font is under the pulpit in the chancel from the 12th century (dismantled in the context of the last reorganization measures in 2003). The church extends along the main street in west east direction.
- Restored half-timbering ensemble in the upper village, classified as a historical monument
- The Bismarckturm is an outlook tower which was built at the emperor time 1909. It is 16.8 m high, has a regular hexagonal ground plan and was built from Grauwacke.
- One of the so-called colored Kerken, a church with medieval ceiling frescos, is in the district Marienhagen.

=== Museums ===
- The museum "axis, wheel and car" represents the 5.500 year history of the vehicle engineering on an over 1,000 m² large exhibition space: Wiehl-Ohlerhammer, admission free.
- Old agricultural equipment and machines are exhibited in the idyllically situated farmer museum: Wiehl, area Monsau.
- Siebenbürger Heimatstube in the arts center Drabenderhöhe. Insights into the still neat customs of the more than 800-year-old traditions and culture strive and arrange household effects in the seven citizen country.
- heritage-protected museum railway 'Wiehl Valley Railway (Wiehltalbahn)' with steam locomotive 'Waldbröl'

=== Regular events ===
- The international Wiehler Jazztage, these enjoy great attention in the Jazzscene, regularly take place (2004 already for the 15th time) since 1989. Well-known jazz musicians like Lilian Boutte (gospel song singer), Al di Meola (guitarist), Götz Alsmann, Lyambiko, Melva Houston, Albie Donnelly's super rank and many others have already appeared in Wiehl.
- Hundreds of different kinds of Dahlien can be inspected at the Wiehler Dahlienschau from August until October.
- Weekly market on Wednesday.
- Native country celebration at the Bismarckturm (beginning of June).
- Town celebration (in August).
- Christmas market at the 1st weekend in December

=== Other ===
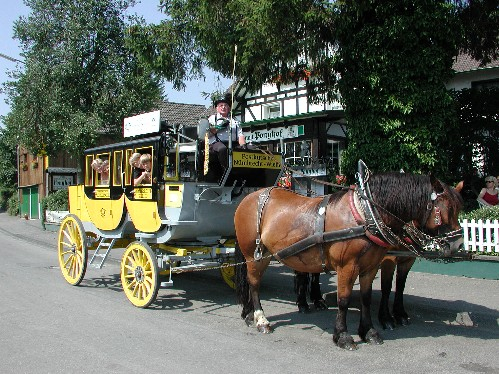
Oberbergische stagecoach with the hold at the pony hotel in Hübender

- Get 30 m under the earth in the Wiehler dripstone cave marriage ceremonies of the Wiehler registry office are carried out regularly.
- Game park
- The "Oberbergische Postkutsche", a mail coach, runs between Nümbrecht and Wiehl every Friday, Saturday and Sunday from May to the end of October. It is a reproduction of the mail coach of the Imperial Post Office around 1871.
- Woods and nature trail
- In the Siefen below the dripstone cave ground monument "golden trough an old mountain work gallery which served the mining of iron ore and extended in branched pit countries to under the villages Hübender, cleric mountain and Abbenroth (municipality of Nümbrecht)". Siefen was mined in the 19th century, the support was finally adjusted 1912 because too low ores lined up at least since the beginning. The gallery served over decades of the Wiehler water supply later. At the restored gallery entrance built with mortar becomes the at times missing stone with the eingemeisselten inscription: Golden trough 1813 " built " again.
- About 6 km eastern of Wiehl Wiehltal dam.

== Facilities for young and old ==
- 1 of municipal and 2 church nursery schools
- Walldorf nursery school
- Town Youth meeting in the Bions store
- Ev. House of the youth
- Youth café "checkpoint"
- Youth hotel (youth hostel)
- Oasis open work for senior citizens
- Old and nursing home "Bethel"
- Welfare and social work and Knight of St John of Jerusalem health and advice center
- Knight of St John of Jerusalem accident help

== Organizations ==
- Balloon sports-fans Oberberg e.V
- Choir Nostalgie
- YMCA Wiehl e.V.
- DLRG OG Wiehl
- DRK Ortsgruppe
- FV Wiehl 2000
- Judo Wiehl e.V.
- Kneipp-Verein Wiehl
- Maltese hospice group Wiehl
- Crazy golf sports club Wiehl
- Ecumenical initiative youth café Wiehl e.V.
- Sauerländischer Gebirgsverein SGV
- Chess club
- German shepherd organization OG Wiehl
- Competitive dancing TSC Wiehl
- TC Wiehl
- Tennis club Wiehl
- TUS Wiehl
- TUS Wiehl sportsIce sports club
- Baseball-team Wiehl
- Male-voice choir 1878 e.V. Wiehl

== Parishes ==
- Ev. Parish Wiehl
- Ev .-free church municipality Wiehl
- Catholic parish Wiehl

== Schools and educational institutions ==
- Community elementary school
- Dietrich Bonhoeffer high school
- Wiehltalhalle, hall of the high school for events of every kind
- School of music of the Homburgischen municipalities of registered association
- Circle adult education center department Wiehl
- Town library
- Kulturkreis Wiehl e.V.

== Twin towns – sister cities ==
Wiehl is twinned with:

- Bistrița, Romania
- Crimmitschau, Germany
- Hem, France
- Yokneam Illit, Israel

== Notable people ==
- Laura Kampf, YouTuber, designer, and craftswoman

== Literature ==
- Siegfried Lauff, "Wiehl in the change of the times 1-3", Wiehl and thinking ore groves 1978-1990 (ISBN 3-88913-150-6)
- Ulrich Melk, Chronik von Wiehl 1131 bis 1920, Wiehl 2001 (ISBN 3-00-008600-5)
- Torsten Sülzer, Vom Dorfbrunnen zum Wasserwerk : Die Geschichte der Wasserwirtschaft an Agger - Wiehl - Bröhl, (ISBN 3-88265-207-1)
- Joachim Kleinmanns, Wiehl-Marienhagen, Broschüre - Rheinischer Verein für Denkmalpflege und Landschaftsschutz e.V. (ISBN 3-88094-571-3)
- Dietrich Rentsch, Oberbergischer Kreis 2. Marienheide - Wiehl, 1976
- 850 Jahre Wiehl 1131–1981, Festschrift zur 850-Jahrfeier der Stadt Wiehl, hg. v. Heimatverein Wiehl, o.O., o.J. [Wiehl 1982]
- Klaus Pampus: "Documentary first mentionings oberbergischer places" .Herausgeber (ed.): Bergischer history organization /Oberberg (ISBN 3-88265-206-3)
- "food oatmeal piece of paper" into exercise book 3, "materials and sources for the oberbergischen regional history". Editor: H.J. Söhn and Lothar Wirths. Ed. Bergischer history organization Oberbergische Abtlg. 2003
- Gottfr. Corbach: "Contributions to the Bergischen history". SCRIBA publishing house, Cologne. Stress this . Ausg.1976 . ISBN 3-921232-48-1
- the same: Represented and processed according to archival sources by Otto merchant to "the Homburg country in the Thirty Years' War", Brosch. ed. of the Raiffeisenbank Nümbrecht (1983)
