= Strombach (Agger) =

River in Germany

Location
- Country: Germany
- State: North Rhine-Westphalia

Physical characteristics
- Source
  - elevation: 354 m (1,161 ft)
- Mouth
  - location: Agger
  - coordinates: 50.9875°N 7.5496°E
  - elevation: 168 m (551 ft)
- Length: 8.3 km (5.2 mi)

Basin features
- Progression: Agger→ Sieg→ Rhine→ North Sea

Strombach is a river of North Rhine-Westphalia, Germany. It is a right tributary of the Agger.

== Geography ==
The current's source comes from the northern outskirts of Gummeroth at an elevation of 354 metres (1,161 ft) above sea level. NN (7 ° 31'14 E, 51 ° 2'23 "N). The stream then slowly moves in a mostly southern direction through a number of villages including: Gummeroth, Strombach, Hardt-Hanfgarten and Liefenroth around Vollmerhausen at 168 metres (551 ft) above sea level where it then opens into the Agger.

== See also ==
- List of rivers of North Rhine-Westphalia
