= Overath =

- Town
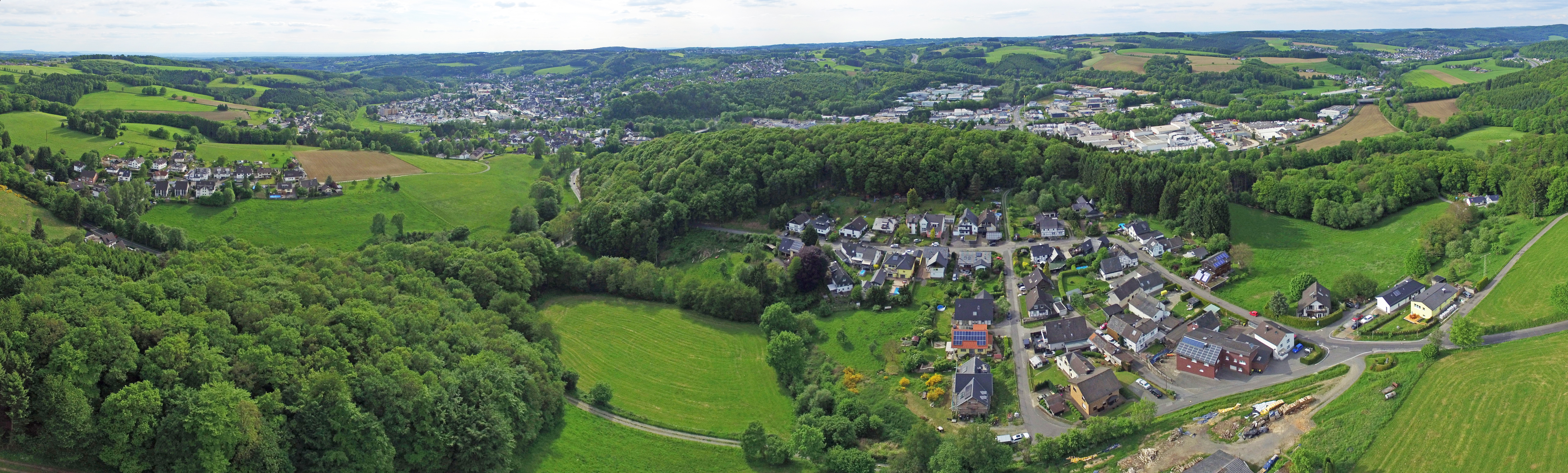

- Coat of arms

- Location of Overath within Rheinisch-Bergischer Kreis district
- Interactive map of Overath
- Location within Germany Location within North Rhine-Westphalia
- Coordinates: 50°57′N 7°18′E
- Country: Germany
- State: North Rhine-Westphalia
- Admin. region: Köln
- District: Rheinisch-Bergischer Kreis
- Subdivisions: 7

Government
  - Mayor (2025–30): Michael Eyer (CDU)

Area
  - Total: 68.88 km^{2} (26.59 sq mi)
- Elevation: 70–348 m (230–1,142 ft)

Population (2025-12-31)
  - Total: 26,707
  - Density: 387.7/km^{2} (1,004/sq mi)
- Time zone: UTC+01:00 (CET)
  - Summer (DST): UTC+02:00 (CEST)
- Postal codes: 51491
- Dialling codes: 02206, 02204, 02207
- Vehicle registration: GL
- Website: www.overath.de

Overath (German: [ˈoːvəʁaːt]; Kölsch: Ovveroth [ˈɔ̂vəˌʁɔːt]) is a town in the Rheinisch-Bergischer district of North Rhine-Westphalia, Germany.

== Geography ==
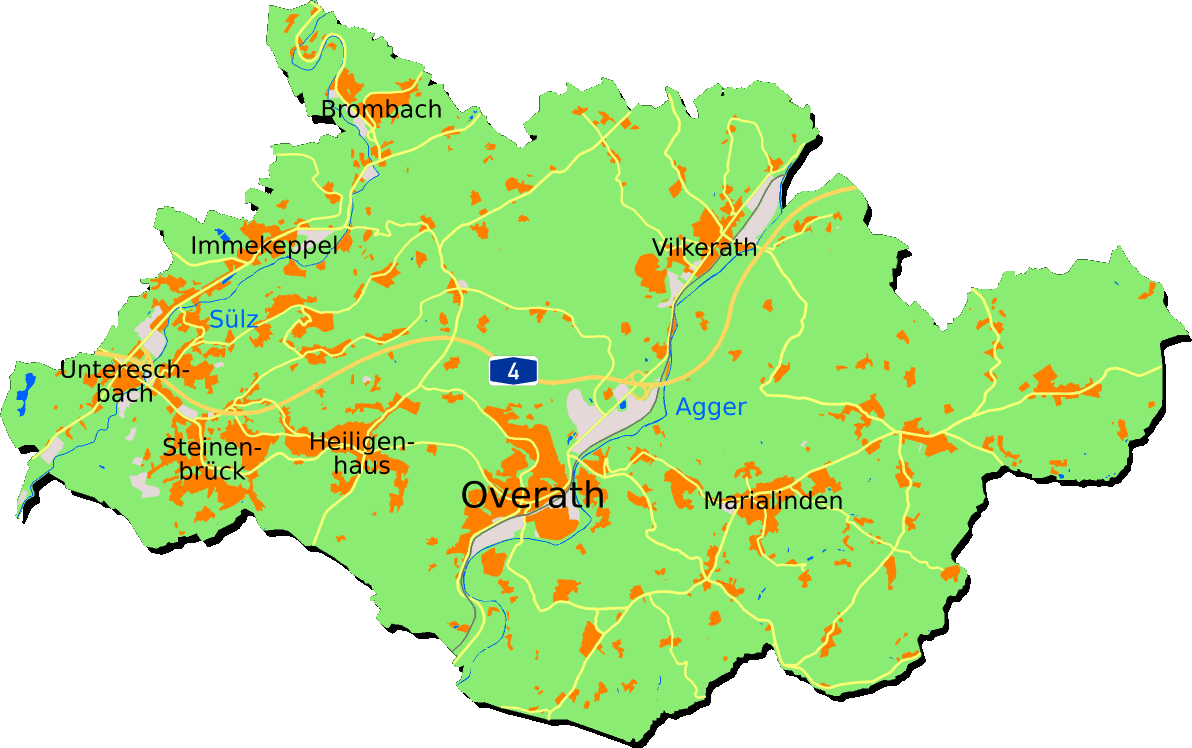
Map of Overath's quarters

Overath is located about 25 km east of Cologne, in the Bergisches Land. Despite the reclassification as a 'Stadt' (town, though the German understanding leans towards city) years ago due to surpassing the relevant population threshold, the former appellation Gemeinde (parish) seems more appropriate (particularly to the inhabitants) due to the spread-out villages it consists of.

The main settlement is in the Agger valley, with others spread on the hills surrounding it. The kleine Heckberg (small Heckberg, 348 m) near Federath is the highest point of Overath, and the whole Rheinisch-Bergischer Kreis.

Neighbouring cities are Rösrath in the West, Bergisch Gladbach in the North-West, Lindlar in the North-East, Engelskirchen in the East and Much, Neunkirchen-Seelscheid and Lohmar in the South.

=== Subdivisions ===
Overath is divided into 7 parts.

- Brombach
- Heiligenhaus
- Immekeppel
- Marialinden
- Steinenbrück
- Untereschbach
- Vilkerath

== History ==
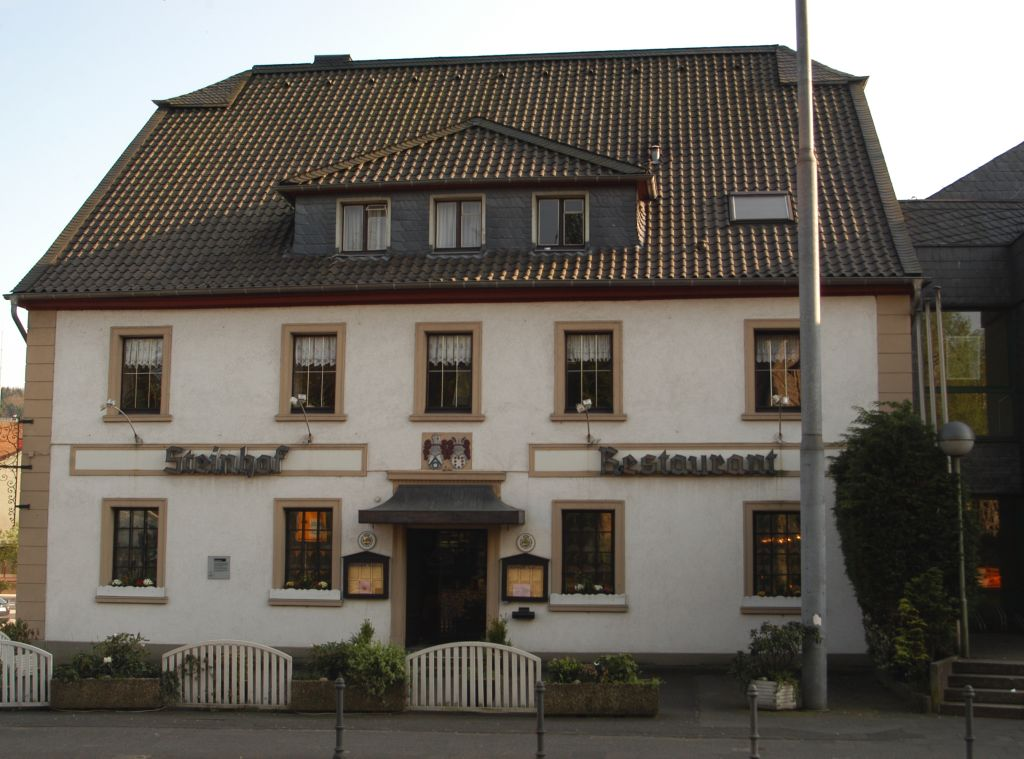
The Steinhof, a restaurant today, is the oldest establishment in Overath. The current building was constructed in 1662.

When first mentioned in 1060, Overath was called "Achera" (after the Agger river). Presumably because of the first settlement at a clearing (German Rodung) the name changed to "Ouerode" (about 1280), "Ovverode" (1304), "Overadt" (1582), and finally became "Overath".

== Demographics ==
Historical population

Year	Pop.	±% p.a.
1939	6,500	—
1946	10,500	+7.09%
1965	16,431	+2.38%
1970	18,617	+2.53%
1975	20,869	+2.31%
1980	21,468	+0.57%
1985	22,913	+1.31%
1990	23,902	+0.85%

Year	Pop.	±% p.a.
1995	25,319	+1.16%
2000	26,115	+0.62%
2005	27,106	+0.75%
2010	26,990	−0.09%
2015	27,264	+0.20%
2020	27,124	−0.10%
2025	26,707	−0.31%

Source: Landesdatabank Nordrhein-Westfalen (1965-2025)

=== Religion ===
The Catholic church is devoted to Saint Walpurga (Heilige Walburga). Until 1803 the Benedictines had a monastery in Cyriax, a subsidiary of Michaelsberg Abbey at Siegburg.

The Catholic church in Heiligenhaus is devoted to Saint Roch (Heiliger Rochus).

Marialinden's church (St. Mariä Heimsuchung) is a pilgrimage destination for Saint Mary.

== Infrastructure ==
=== Transportation ===
==== Roads ====
The B 55 und B 484 federal roads (German Bundesstraßen) as well as the A 4 Autobahn pass through area of the town. The A 4 has got two exits to Overath, Overath-Untereschbach and Overath.

==== Air transport ====
The Cologne Bonn Airport is reachable within 25 minutes.

==== Public transport ====
The railway station in Overath connects the town with Cologne and Marienheide. The train heading for Cologne departs every 30 minutes, the train heading for Marienheide departs every 60 minutes. Cologne is reachable by train in within 35 minutes.

These traffic connections, together with rural surroundings, make Overath a popular place to live for commuters.

=== Healthcare ===
There is no hospital in Overath. The nearest hospitals are in Bergisch Gladbach and Engelskirchen.

== Government ==
=== City council ===
The city council consists of 38 members. The current breakdown, from the general elections held September 26, 2004, is as follows:

Seats
Party	2004	1999
CDU	19	22
SPD	9	8
FDP	6	5
Grüne	4	3

=== Mayor ===
Michael Eyer was elected mayor (German Bürgermeister) in September 2025, representing CDU.

=== Coat of arms ===
The coat of arms of Overath was only created on March 3, 1938. It consists of two areas:

- The upper area shows the lion of Berg. It symbolizes the former jurisdiction by the Earldom of Berg.
- The lower area shows a golden bell. It is supposed to symbolize a tradition of bell making. The inclusion of the bell is, however, due to a 15th and 16th century bell making family von Overra[i]de from Cologne, which falsely led to belief that bells were cast in Overath.

== Twin towns – sister cities ==
Overath is twinned with:

- Colne Valley, England, United Kingdom
- Pérenchies, France
