= Bergneustadt =

- Town
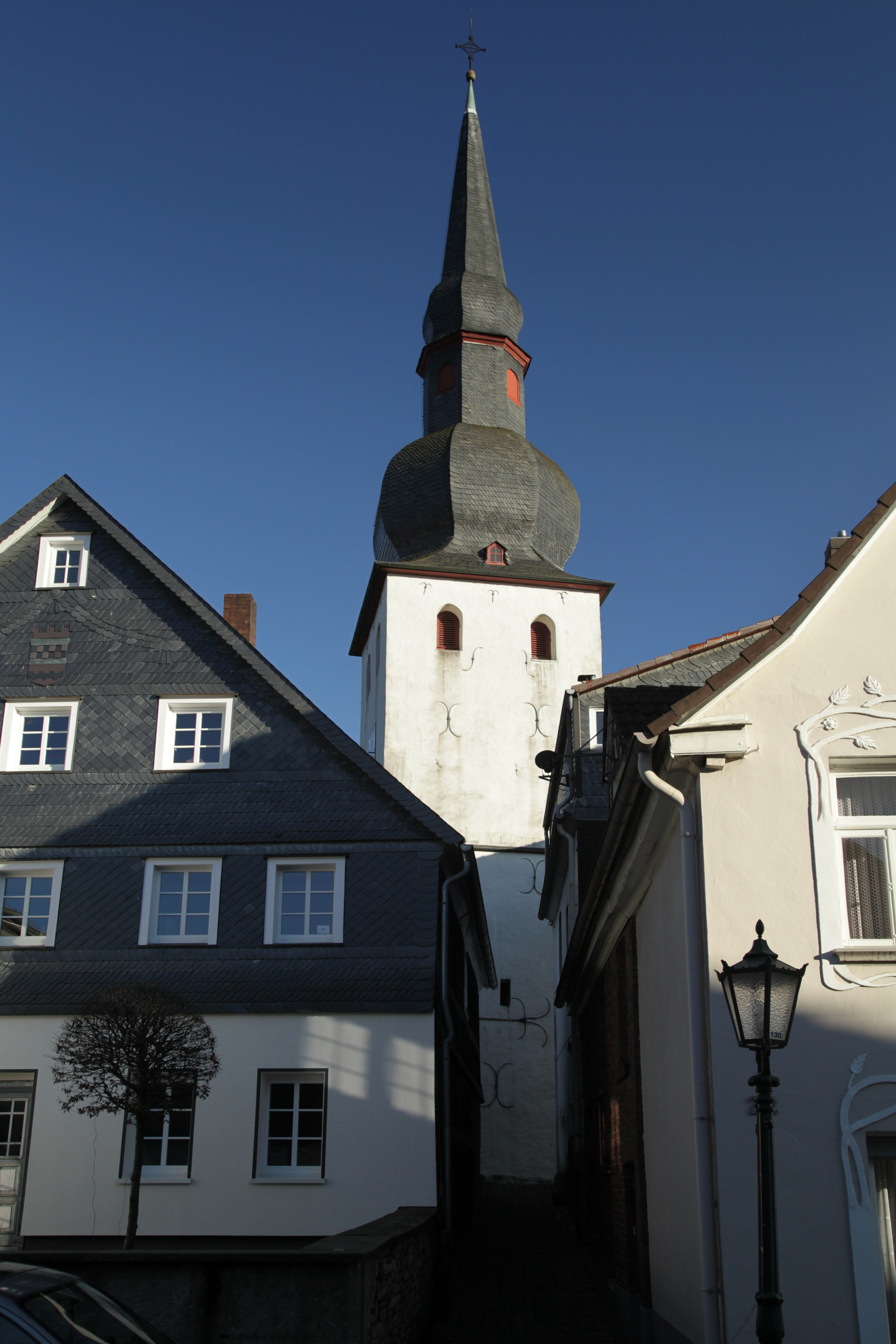

- Coat of arms

- Location of Bergneustadt within Oberbergischer Kreis district
- Interactive map of Bergneustadt
- Location within Germany Location within North Rhine-Westphalia
- Coordinates: 51°2′N 7°39′E
- Country: Germany
- State: North Rhine-Westphalia
- Admin. region: Köln
- District: Oberbergischer Kreis

Government
  - Mayor (2025–30): Matthias Thul (CDU)

Area
  - Total: 37.89 km^{2} (14.63 sq mi)
- Elevation: 206–500 m (676–1,640 ft)

Population (2025-12-31)
  - Total: 18,701
  - Density: 493.6/km^{2} (1,278/sq mi)
- Time zone: UTC+01:00 (CET)
  - Summer (DST): UTC+02:00 (CEST)
- Postal codes: 51702
- Dialling codes: 02261
- Vehicle registration: GM
- Website: www.bergneustadt.de

Bergneustadt (German pronunciation: [bɛʁkˈnɔʏʃtat]) is a municipality in the eastern part of the Oberbergischer Kreis (district), in North Rhine-Westphalia, Germany. It is located 50 km east of Cologne. It is part of the Berg region.

== History ==
In 1301, the drost Rutger of Altena started with the construction of the Niestat, as an outpost of the County of Mark against the archbishop of Cologne, on the request of Eberhard II, Count of the Mark. The new "Veste" soon received the same rights as Lüdenscheid. Together with Wipperfürth, Lüdenscheid and Lennep, it belongs to a series of town foundations of the 13th century in the border region of the County of Mark and the County of Berg.

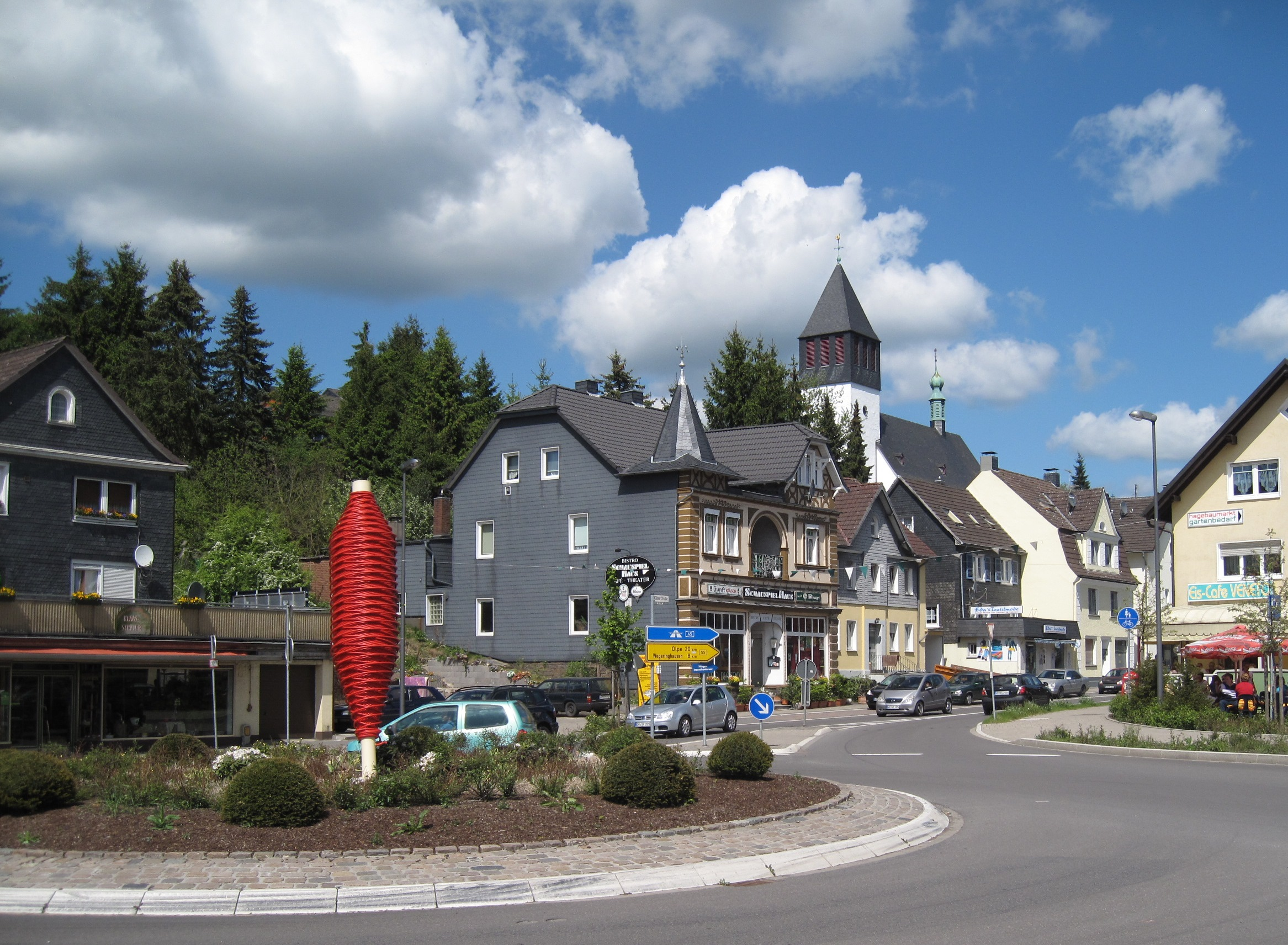
Bergneustadt in 2010

The new town had impressive fortifications, including the town castle on a mountain spur above the river Dörspe. Parts of the town walls have survived. After early 17th century Neustadt went into decline, due to war, epidemics, fires and decreased strategic importance. After 1830 the construction of major roads and the railway lines from Siegburg and Cologne to Olpe (1896-1903) helped the town to new growth, further aided by strong industrial growth since the 1950s. The main activities were car industry, paper treatment, metal treatment and plastic treatment as well as mechanical engineering.

Older than the main town are Wiedenest (1154), Altenothe (1237), Belmicke (1296); they all are a part of Bergneustadt since 1969. The decorated church (Bunte Kirche) in Wiedenest dates from the 12th century and is one of the most beautiful churches in North Rhine-Westphalia.

== Geography ==
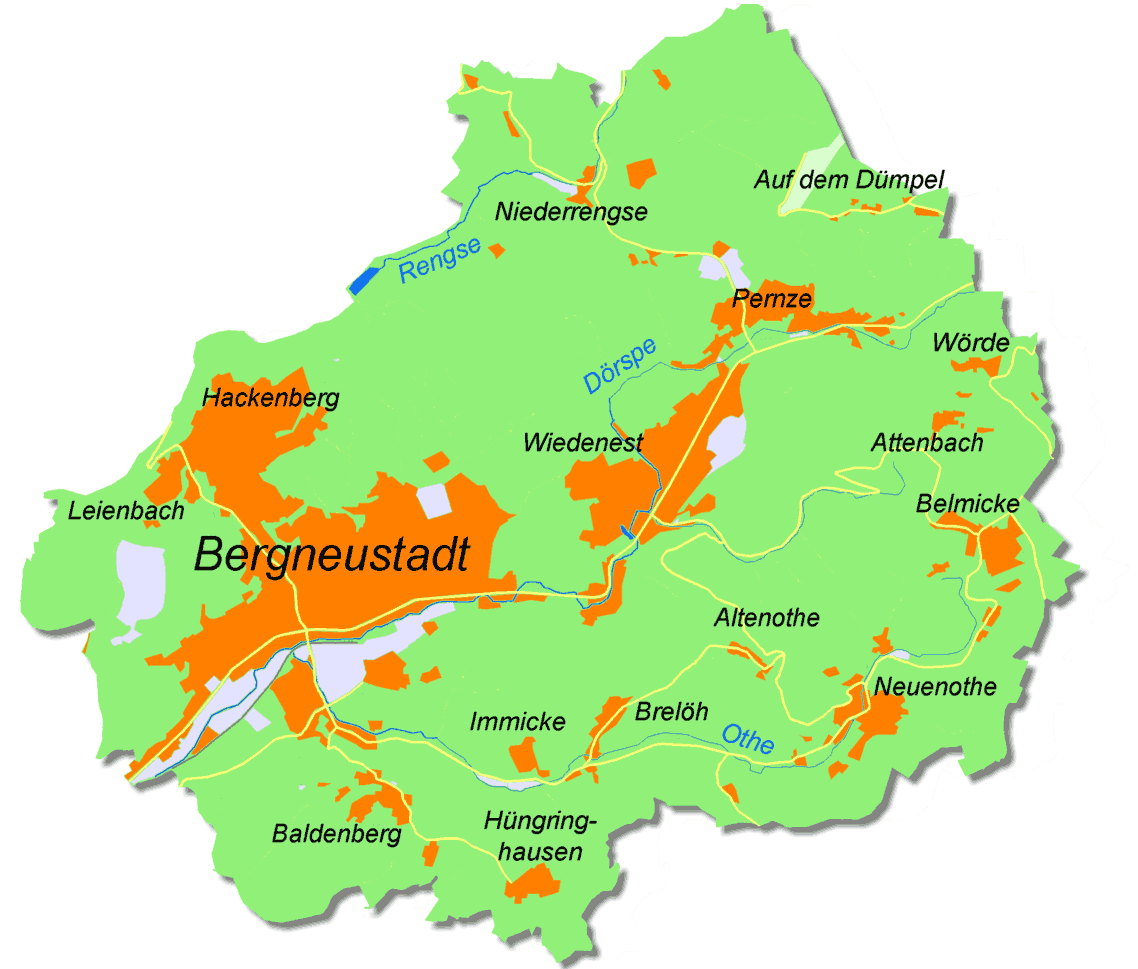
Map of the municipality Bergneustadt

Bergneustadt is situated in the Bergisches Land, an area of low hills east of the river Rhine and west of the higher Sauerland hills. The town lies in the valley of the small river Dörspe, a tributary of the Agger. Neighbouring municipalities are Gummersbach to the west, Drolshagen to the east, and Reichshof to the south.

The municipality Bergneustadt consists of the main town Bergneustadt and 22 Ortsteile (districts): Altenothe, Attenbach, Auf dem Dümpel, Baldenberg, Belmicke, Bösinghausen, Brelöh, Freischlade, Geschleide, Hackenberg, Höh, Hüngringhausen, Immicke, Leienbach, Neuenothe, Niederrengse, Pernze, Pustenbach, Rosenthal, Rosenthalseifen, Wiedenest and Wörde. The largest of these are Hackenberg (pop. 3,326 in 2005), Wiedenest (pop. 3,029) and Pernze (pop. 1,071).

== Politics ==
Bergneustadt has a youth council which allows the council to participate in decision-making for the city. The current mayor of Bergneustadt is Matthias Thul of the CDU, who has been serving as mayor since 2020. In the 2025 local election he was reelected with 61,03 % of the vote.

=== City council ===
After the 2025 local elections, the Bergneustadt city council is composed as follows:

Party	Votes	%	+/-	Seats	+/-
Christian Democratic Union (CDU)	2,919	37.2	▼2.0	12	▼1
Social Democratic Party (SPD)	2,074	26.4	▼2.4	9	▼1
Alternative for Germany (AfD)	1,465	18.7	New	6	New
Independent Voters' Association Bergneustadt (UWG)	432	5.5	▼5.9	2	▼2
Free Voters' Association Bergneustadt (FWGB)	397	5.1	▼1.3	2	±0
Alliance 90/The Greens (Grüne)	385	4.9	▼3.1	2	▼1
Free Democratic Party (FDP)	181	2.3	▼4.1	1	▼1
Valid votes	7,853	99.3			
Invalid votes	54	0.7			
Total	7,907	100.0		34	±0
Electorate/voter turnout	13,908	56.9			
Source: City of Bergneustadt

== The coat of arms ==
The arms were granted on December 24, 1876.

The town developed around a castle built in 1301 by Rüttger von Altena ordered by Earl Eberhard II of the Mark. The oldest seals of the city date from the middle of the 14th century and already show the present arms. The upper part of the arms shows the arms of the Counts of the Mark, the lower part the older arms of the (oldest) Counts of Berg, from which the Counts of the Mark descended. From 1922-1969 the city used a mural crown on the arms.

== Buildings and institutions ==
=== Historical buildings ===
- In the district Wiedenest stands a "colored church" with colorful medieval paintings at the ceiling.

=== Public utilities ===
==== Libraries ====
- Public library Bergneustadt

==== Banks ====
- Sparkasse (Savings bank) Gummersbach-Bergneustadt with four offices (city centre, district Stadtwald, district Wiedenest, district Pernze)
- Commerzbank with one office
- Deutsche Bank with one office
- Volksbank Oberberg e.V. with one office

==== Schools ====
- "Gemeinschaftsgrundschule Bergneustadt 'Auf dem Bursten' " (primary school)
- "Katholische Grundschule Bergneustadt" (catholic primary school)
- "Gemeinschaftsgrundschule Bergneustadt-Hackenberg" (primary school)
- "Gemeinschaftsgrundschule Bergneustadt-Wiedenest" (primary school)
- "Wüllenweber Gymnasium" (grammar school/high school Bergneustadt)
- "Städtische Realschule Bergneustadt" (city secondary school)
- "Gemeinschaftshauptschule" (general school Bergneustadt)

=== Religious groups and communities ===
==== Protestant parishes and churches ====
- Evangelische Kirchengemeinde Bergneustadt (Lutheran denomination) with
  • Altstadtkirche (17th century)
  • Versöhnerkirche, district Stadtwald (1966)
  • Gemeindecentrum Hackenberg (1976)
- Evangelische Kirchengemeinde Wiedenest (Lutheran denomination) with churches in
  • Wiedenest (Bunte Kerk, 11th century)
  • Neuenothe (chapel, 1960s)
  • Pernze (1960s)

==== Roman Catholic parishes and churches ====
- Roman Catholic parish Saint Stephanus, Bergneustadt
- Roman Catholic parish Saint Matthias, Hackenberg
- Roman Catholic parish Saint Anna, Belmicke, with a chapel in Wiedenest/Pernze

==== Evangelical parishes ====
- Evangelisch-freikirchliche Gemeinden (Brüdergemeinden) Wiedenest
- Evangelisch-freikirchliche Gemeinden (Brüdergemeinden) Hackenberg
- Evangelisch-freikirchliche Gemeinde (Baptisten) Bergneustadt, Wilhelmstrasse
- Common Bible school - Wiedenest (this is the bible school of the German brethren)
- Christen ohne Namen (= Christians without a name)
- Ecclesia

==== Other religious groups ====
- Jehovah's Witnesses
- New Apostolic Church

== Associations ==
- FC Wiedenest-Othetal (football) www.fc-wiedenest-othetal.de
- TV Bergneustadt (different sports, e.g. handball, gymnastics, karate)
- Chess association Bergneustadt/Derschlag
- Stamp collector's association Bergneustadt
- Baris Spor Hackenberg (football)
- SSV Bergneustadt (football)
- Bodyguard (kickboxing, Thai-boxing, boxing, yoga)
- Table tennis association "Schwalbe" Bergneustadt ("Schwalbe" being the main sponsor)
- Soar club Bergneustadt
- German Red Cross Bergneustadt
- HSG Bergneustadt-Gummersbach
- BSV (swimming)
- THW-Bergneustadt
- The Voices (choir with newer repertoire)

== Economy ==
The city's major employer is Metalsa Automotive GmbH (formerly Innomotive Systems Europe GmbH or briefly called ISE) - a supplier of the automotive industry which is specialized in the development and production of innovative structural and safety systems for automobiles. With 2000 employees in Germany and 12200 globally.

== Population ==
Historical population

Year	Pop.	±% p.a.
1871	1,549	—
1900	3,518	+2.87%
1939	4,183	+0.44%
1950	6,330	+3.84%
1965	14,759	+5.81%
1970	16,711	+2.52%
1975	17,820	+1.29%
1980	18,014	+0.22%
1985	17,131	−1.00%

Year	Pop.	±% p.a.
1990	20,040	+3.19%
1995	20,772	+0.72%
2000	20,764	−0.01%
2005	20,506	−0.25%
2010	19,584	−0.92%
2015	18,940	−0.67%
2020	18,502	−0.47%
2025	18,701	+0.21%

Source: Landesdatabank Nordrhein-Westfalen (1965-2025)

== Transport ==
=== Road ===
Bergneustadt is connected to the Bundesautobahn 4 (Cologne - Olpe) by a feeder road. The Bundesstraße 55 runs through the city centre, through the district Wiedenest and along the district Pernze. It connects the town with Gummersbach (in the West) and Drolshagen (in the East).

=== Public transport ===
At the bus stop Graf-Eberhard-Platz in the city centre are stopping the following bus lines:

- No. 301 : Gummersbach —- Bergneustadt —- Olpe
- No. 313 : Bergneustadt (city centre) —- Attenbach
- No. 314 : Bergneustadt (city centre) —- Hackenberg (district)
- No. 315 : Bergneustadt (city centre) —- Stadtwald (district)

=== Air transport ===
There is an airfield with a 600 m (1968.5 ft) long grass airstrip in the district Auf dem Dümpel. Planes with one motor and a maximal weight of 3,400 pounds and helicopters with a maximal weight of 11,400 pounds are allowed to alight.

== Town twinnings ==
- Châtenay-Malabry, F, 1967
- Landsmeer, NL, since 1968

Châtenay-Malabry and Landsmeer are also twinned since 1986

- „Arbeitsgemeinschaft Neustadt in Europa“ (see the german Wikipedia: „Neustadt in Europa“)

== Notable people ==
- Friedhelm Julius Beucher (born 1946), teacher, politician (SPD), member of the Bundestag 1990–2002
- Anja Harteros (born 1972), opera singer
- Horst Janzen (1930–1978), painter
- Johann Gottlieb Nörremberg (1787–1862), physicist
- Heinz Schilling (born 1942), historian at the Humboldt University of Berlin
