= Engelskirchen =

- Municipality
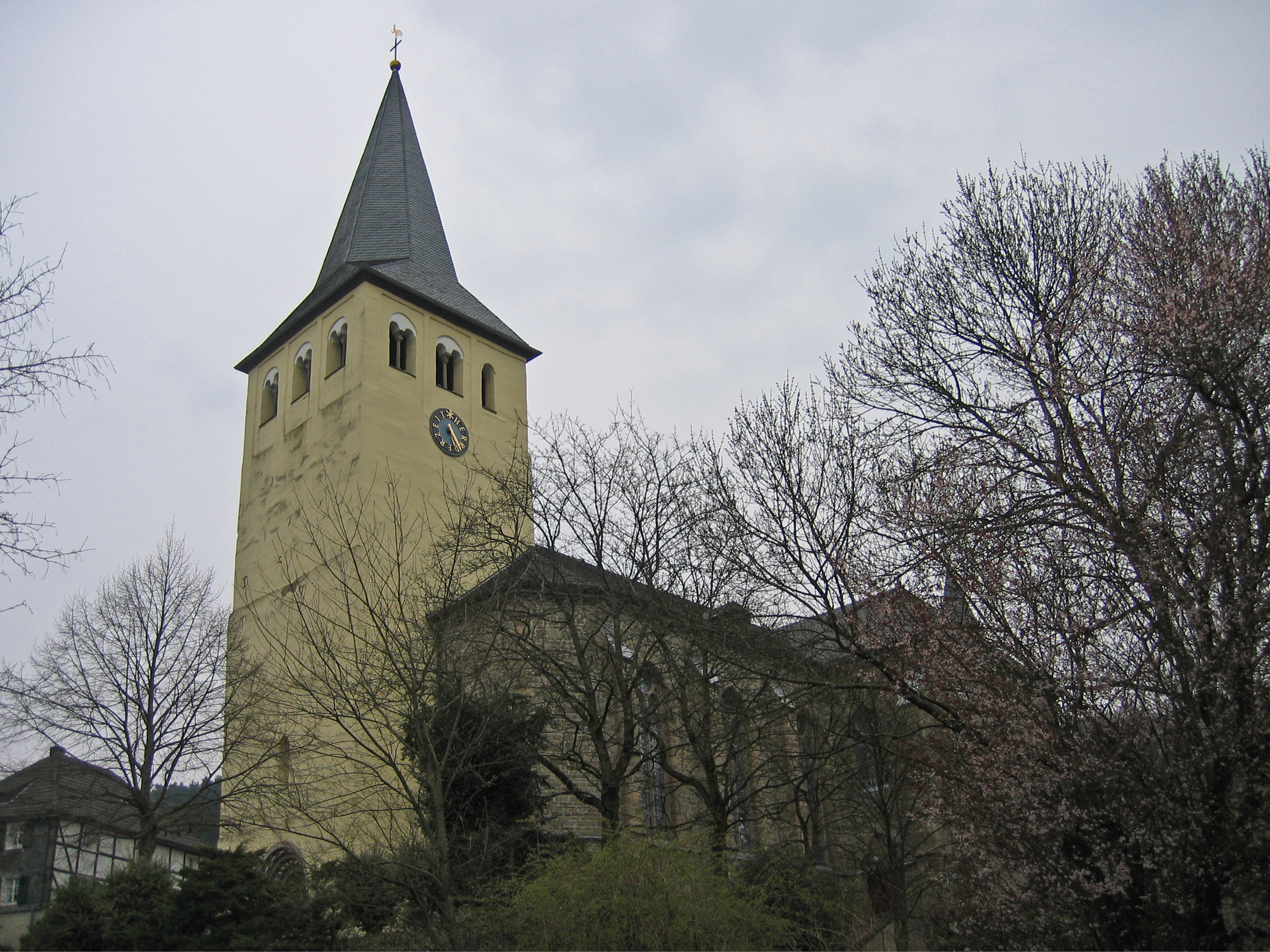
- Saints Peter and Paul Church

- Flag Coat of arms

- Location of Engelskirchen within Oberbergischer Kreis district
- Interactive map of Engelskirchen
- Location within Germany Location within North Rhine-Westphalia
- Coordinates: 50°59′N 7°25′E
- Country: Germany
- State: North Rhine-Westphalia
- Admin. region: Köln
- District: Oberbergischer Kreis

Government
  - Mayor (2020–25): Dr. Gero Karthaus (SPD)

Area
  - Total: 63.03 km^{2} (24.34 sq mi)
- Elevation: 124 m (407 ft)

Population (2025-12-31)
  - Total: 19,775
  - Density: 313.7/km^{2} (812.6/sq mi)
- Time zone: UTC+01:00 (CET)
  - Summer (DST): UTC+02:00 (CEST)
- Postal codes: 51766
- Dialling codes: 02263
- Vehicle registration: GM
- Website: www.engelskirchen.de

Engelskirchen (German pronunciation: [ɛŋl̩sˈkɪʁçn̩], lit. 'angel’s churches') is a municipality in Oberbergischer Kreis, Germany in North Rhine-Westphalia, about 40 kilometres (25 miles) east of Cologne. The neighbouring municipalities are (clockwise from the west) Overath, Lindlar, Gummersbach, Wiehl and Much.

== History ==
Engelskirchen is an old Bergisches Land settlement mentioned for the first time in 1353 as Engellerskerken. On 1 January 1975, the independent municipalities of Engelskirchen and Ründeroth, formally known as 'Runde Rode' were combined to form the modern-day Engelskirchen.

== Population ==
Historical population

Year	Pop.	±% p.a.
1965	17,181	—
1970	17,454	+0.32%
1975	17,323	−0.15%
1980	17,983	+0.75%
1985	18,144	+0.18%
1990	19,400	+1.35%
1995	20,442	+1.05%

Year	Pop.	±% p.a.
2000	20,647	+0.20%
2005	20,569	−0.08%
2010	19,988	−0.57%
2015	19,307	−0.69%
2020	19,297	−0.01%
2025	19,775	+0.49%

Source: Landesdatabank Nordrhein-Westfalen

== Coat of arms of Engelskirchen ==
The coat of arms, granted on 24 March 1976, contains the lion of the Counts of Berg and the chequered bar of the arms of the Counts of the Mark. Historically the municipality was part of both counties.

== Subdivision ==
The municipality Engelskirchen consists of the following settlements: Albertsthal, Bellingroth, Bickenbach, Blumenau, Büscherhof, Büscherhöfchen, Buschhausen, Daxborn, Distelhaus, Dörrenberg, Dumpe, Ehreshoven, Engelskirchen, Erlenhof, Feckelsberg, Forkscheid, Grünscheid, Hahn, Hardt, Haus Ley, Haus Selbach, Heide, Hintersteimel, Hülsen, Hollenberg, Kaltenbach, Kastor, Lepperhammer, Loope, Lüdenbach, Madonna, Meisenbüchel, Miebach, Müllensiefen, Neuenhaus, Neuhardt, Neuremscheid, Niederhof, Oberbüchel, Oberhollenberg, Oberstaat, Obersteeg, Oesinghausen, Ötterstal, Ohl, Osberghausen, Papiermühle, Perdt, Remerscheid, Rennbruch, Rommersberg, Rosenau, Rottland, Ründeroth, Schiffarth, Schnellenbach, Staadt, Steeg, Stiefelhagen, Stürzenberg, Thal, Unterbüchel, Unterhollenberg, Unterkaltenbach, Unterschelmerath, Unterstaat, Vordersteimel, Wahlscheid, Walbach, Wallefeld, Werthsiefen, Westen and Wiehlmünden.

== Sites of interest ==
=== Museums ===
- Baumwollspinnerei Ermen & Engels, one of six locations of the Rheinisches Industriemuseum
- Oelchenshammer, a museum forge

=== Castles and castles ===
- Ehreshoven Castle
- Water castle Alsbach

=== Monuments ===
- The old warrior's monument with thing site.
- The grave yard next to the St. Peter and Paul's church with crosses and a small chapel is the modern Memorial for war victims.
- The Lohmühle and three other mills in the Lambachtal
- Aggertal cave in Ründeroth

=== Catholic parish church of Saints Peter and Paul ===
The origin of the parish church with the name Saints Peter and Paul in Engelskirchen lies in the 13th century. The massive west tower dates back to this time. It became an independent parish following its separation from Saint Severinus parish in Lindlar in 1554. The number of parishioners outgrew the capacity of the church in the 19th century. Then a new three-aisle long house on round pillars with transepts and separate main choir was established. From 1943 to 1945 homeless inhabitants of Cologne and foreign civilian prisoners were housed here. Nonetheless, an air raid on the last day of the war resulted in two bombs destroying part of the church. The bombs hit the aisle and tower, and the vault collapsed. Three years later, a minimal renovation was done. In the 1970s, there was a more thorough renovation. Later a new sacristy was built.

=== Christmas post office ===
Each year from November 15 until December 22, the post office of Engelskirchen (whose name literally means "angel's churches") answers letters to the Christkind (Christ Child). In 2009, over 160,000 letters arrived from all over the world.

== Twin towns ==
- Plan-de-Cuques, France, since 1972
- Mogilno, Poland, since 2012

== Literature ==
- Josef Hesse - Engelskirchen im 19. und 20. Jahrunderte (Engelskirchen in the 19th and the 20th Centuries), Engelskirchen 1985
- Peter Opladen and Edmund Schiefeling, Engelskirchen im Aggertal 1051
