= Agger (river) =

River in Germany

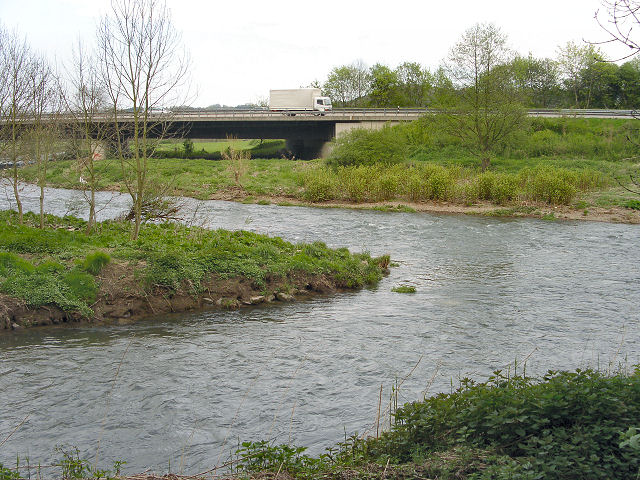
- The confluence of the Sülz and Agger Rivers near Lohmar

Location
- Country: Germany
- State: North Rhine-Westphalia

Physical characteristics
- Source
  - location: Sauerland
- Mouth
  - location: Sieg
  - coordinates: 50°48′2″N 7°10′27″E
- Length: 69.5 km (43.2 mi)
- Basin size: 816 km^{2} (315 sq mi)

Basin features
- Progression: Sieg→ Rhine→ North Sea
- Tributaries
  - left: Wiehl, Naafbach
  - right: Leppe, Sülz

The Agger (German pronunciation: [ˈaɡɐ]) is a river in Germany, a right tributary of the Sieg in North Rhine-Westphalia. It is 69.5 kilometres (43.2 mi) long. Its source is in the Sauerland hills, near Meinerzhagen. It winds through the towns Engelskirchen, Overath and Lohmar. Near Siegburg the Agger flows into the Sieg.

== Tributaries ==
The following rivers are tributaries to the river Agger (from source to mouth):

- Left: Rengse, Dörspe, Steinagger, Halstenbach, Wiehl, Kaltenbach, Loopebach, Schlingenbach, Lombach, Hohner Bach, Naafbach, Jabach, Auelsbach, Rothenbach
- Right: Genkel, Seßmarbach, Rospebach, Strombach, Loper Bach, Walbach, Leppe, Oberscheider Bach, Sülz

== See also ==
- List of rivers of North Rhine-Westphalia
