= Lohmar =

- Town
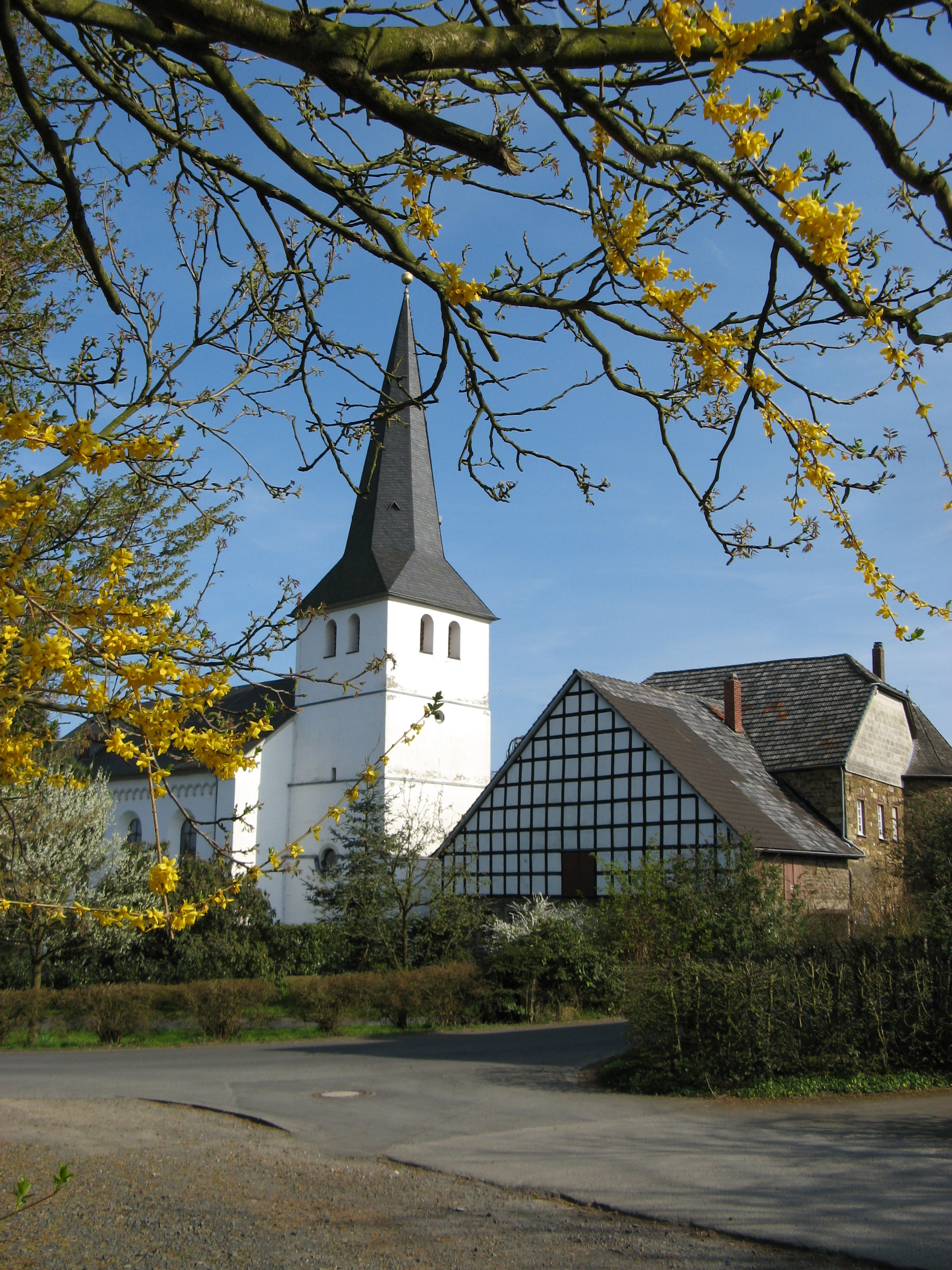
- Protestant church in Honrath

- Coat of arms

- Location of Lohmar within Rhein-Sieg-Kreis district
- Interactive map of Lohmar
- Location within Germany Location within North Rhine-Westphalia
- Coordinates: 50°49′N 7°13′E
- Country: Germany
- State: North Rhine-Westphalia
- Admin. region: Köln
- District: Rhein-Sieg-Kreis
- Subdivisions: 12

Government
  - Mayor (2020–25): Claudia Wieja (Greens)

Area
  - Total: 65.62 km^{2} (25.34 sq mi)
- Elevation: 64 m (210 ft)

Population (2025-12-31)
  - Total: 30,904
  - Density: 471.0/km^{2} (1,220/sq mi)
- Time zone: UTC+01:00 (CET)
  - Summer (DST): UTC+02:00 (CEST)
- Postal codes: 53797
- Dialling codes: 02205, 02206, 02241, 02246, 02247
- Vehicle registration: SU
- Website: www.lohmar.de

Lohmar (German pronunciation: [ˈloːmaʁ]; Ripuarian: Luhme) is a municipality and a town in the Rhein-Sieg district, in North Rhine-Westphalia, Germany.

== Geography ==
Lohmar is located about 20 km east of Cologne and 15 km north-east of Bonn in the Bergisches Land area. Because it is only 20 minutes by car to Cologne or Bonn, Lohmar is a popular place for commuters.

The municipality of Lohmar is divided into two parts: Lohmar itself and Wahlscheid 7 km to the north. About a third of the total population lives in Wahlscheid (a separate municipality until 1969). In total Lohmar comprises 30 districts. The most important are Lohmar itself (est. population approx. 9500), Donrath (2200), Heide (2100) and Birk (1400) in the south, as well as Wahlscheid (3200), Neuhonrath (2000), Honrath (1500) and Agger (1000) in the north.

Lohmar, Donrath, Wahlscheid, Neuhonrath and Agger are located in the Agger valley, the other villages in the uplands.

== History ==
Lohmar was first mentioned as a donation of archbishop Sigewid to the church of Cologne. A farmyard in Lomereis mentioned.

Lohmar is also mentioned on the Arc de Triomphe in Paris as a place of Napoleon's visit. While his inspection of the army positioned in the Rhineland in 1811 he lived in Schloss Auel in Lohmar.

== Population ==
Historical population

Year	Pop.	±% p.a.
1965	13,235	—
1970	18,853	+7.33%
1975	21,432	+2.60%
1980	23,489	+1.85%
1985	25,163	+1.39%
1990	27,098	+1.49%
1995	29,509	+1.72%

Year	Pop.	±% p.a.
2000	30,659	+0.77%
2005	31,235	+0.37%
2010	31,129	−0.07%
2015	30,348	−0.51%
2020	30,316	−0.02%
2025	30,904	+0.38%

Source: Landesdatabank Nordrhein-Westfalen

== Politics ==
=== Town council ===
The town council consists of 40 members. The current breakdown after the local elections held on 13 September 2020 is as follows:

- CDU 16 members
- Grüne 14 members
- SPD 5 members
- FDP 2 members
- UWG 2 members
- Volksabstimmung 1 member

The CDU and Grünen govern the town as a coalition.

=== Mayor ===
- Mayor: Claudia Wieja (Grüne)

=== Coat of arms ===
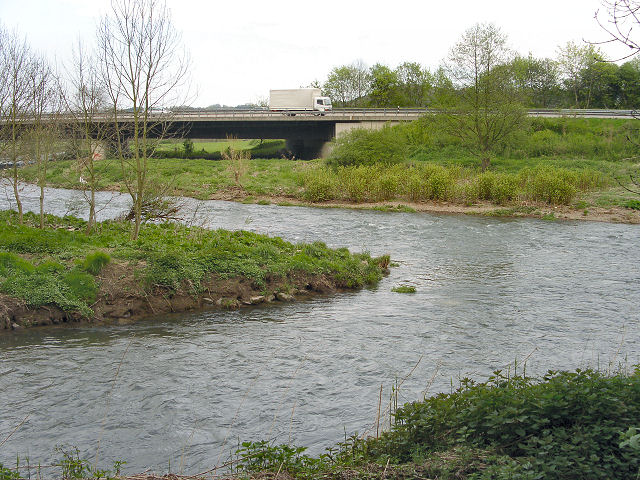
Meeting of Agger (upper) and Sülz (lower)

The coat of arms contains a lion of Berg in the upper fragment. It symbolizes the former jurisdiction by the Earldom of Berg. The lower fraction shows the meeting of the Agger and the Sülz rivers.

== Twin towns – sister cities ==
Lohmar is twinned with:

- Eppendorf, Germany (1990)
- Frouard, France (1974)
- Pompey, France (1974)
- Vila Verde, Portugal (1986)
- Żarów, Poland (2007)

== Transport ==
Lohmar is served by Honrath railway station on the Cologne–Overath railway. A train to Cologne stops every 30 minutes. The trip to Cologne lasts about 30 minutes. A service runs in the other direction to Overath every 30 minutes.

=== Roads ===
Lohmar is connected to the Bundesautobahn 3 with following exits:

- Rösrath/Lohmar-Nord (only coming from Cologne)
- Lohmar-Nord/Rösrath
- Lohmar

The Bundesautobahn 4 connects through exit

- Overath

=== Airports ===
The Cologne Bonn Airport is reachable within 25 minutes.
