= Much, North Rhine-Westphalia =

Much
- Municipality
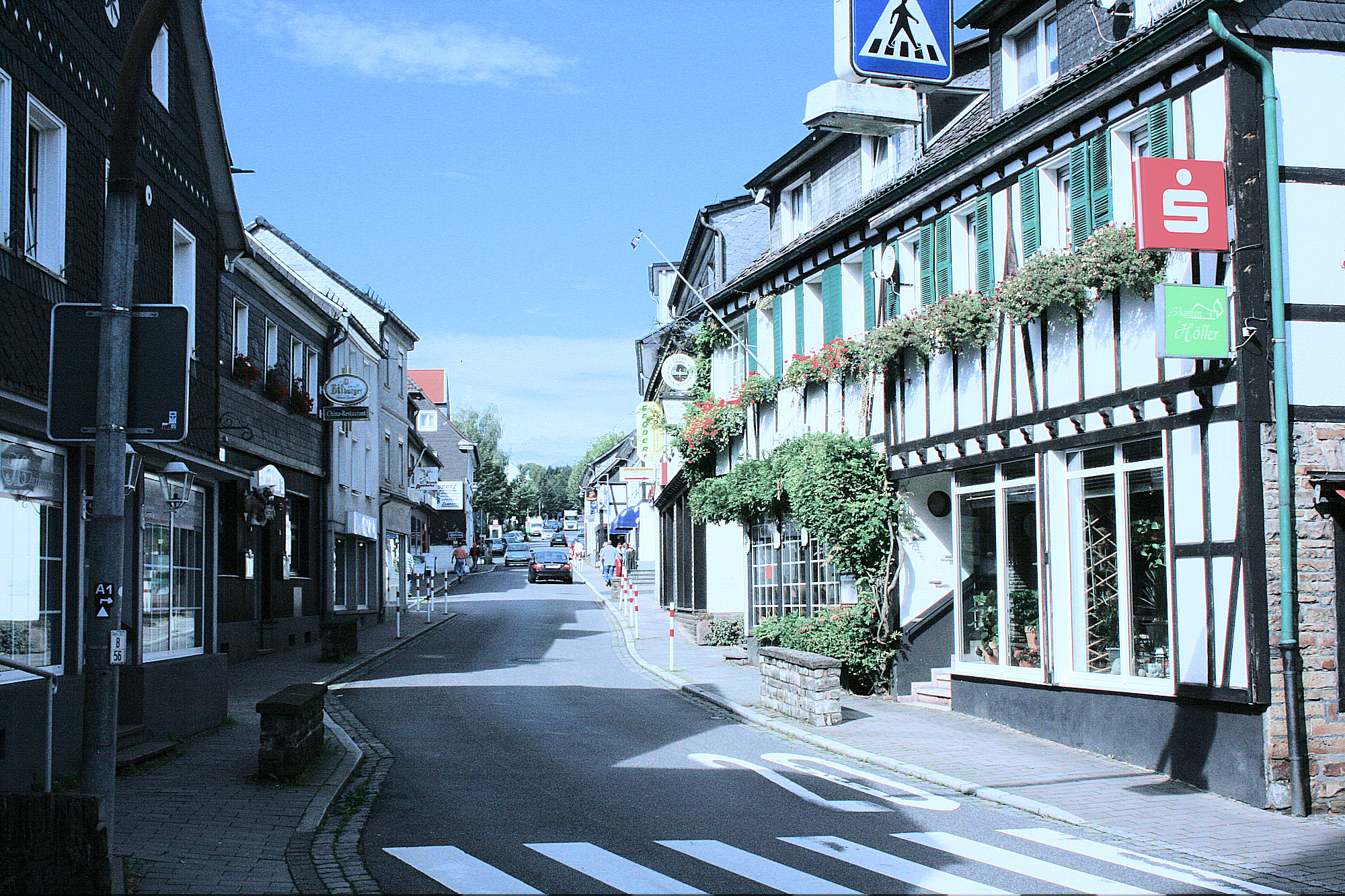

- Coat of arms

- Location of Much within Rhein-Sieg-Kreis district
- Interactive map of Much
- Location within Germany Location within North Rhine-Westphalia
- Coordinates: 50°55′N 7°24′E
- Country: Germany
- State: North Rhine-Westphalia
- Admin. region: Köln
- District: Rhein-Sieg-Kreis
- Subdivisions: 114

Government
  - Mayor (2020–25): Norbert Büscher (CDU)

Area
  - Total: 78.06 km^{2} (30.14 sq mi)
- Elevation: 236 m (774 ft)

Population (2025-12-31)
  - Total: 14,629
  - Density: 187.4/km^{2} (485.4/sq mi)
- Time zone: UTC+01:00 (CET)
  - Summer (DST): UTC+02:00 (CEST)
- Postal codes: 53804
- Dialling codes: 02245
- Vehicle registration: SU
- Website: www.much.de

Much (German pronunciation: [ˈmuːx]) is a municipality in the Rhein-Sieg district, in North Rhine-Westphalia, Germany. It is situated approximately 30 kilometres (19 mi) north-east of Bonn, and 20 kilometres (12 mi) south-west of Gummersbach.

== Population ==
Historical population

Year	Pop.	±% p.a.
1965	7,245	—
1970	7,841	+1.59%
1975	8,738	+2.19%
1980	10,176	+3.09%
1985	11,239	+2.01%
1990	12,318	+1.85%
1995	13,883	+2.42%

Year	Pop.	±% p.a.
2000	14,785	+1.27%
2005	15,095	+0.42%
2010	14,893	−0.27%
2015	14,468	−0.58%
2020	14,491	+0.03%
2025	14,629	+0.19%

Source: Landesdatabank Nordrhein-Westfalen

== Twin towns ==
- Doullens, France, since 1976
- Groß Köris, Brandenburg, since 1991
