= Sieg (river) =

River in Germany

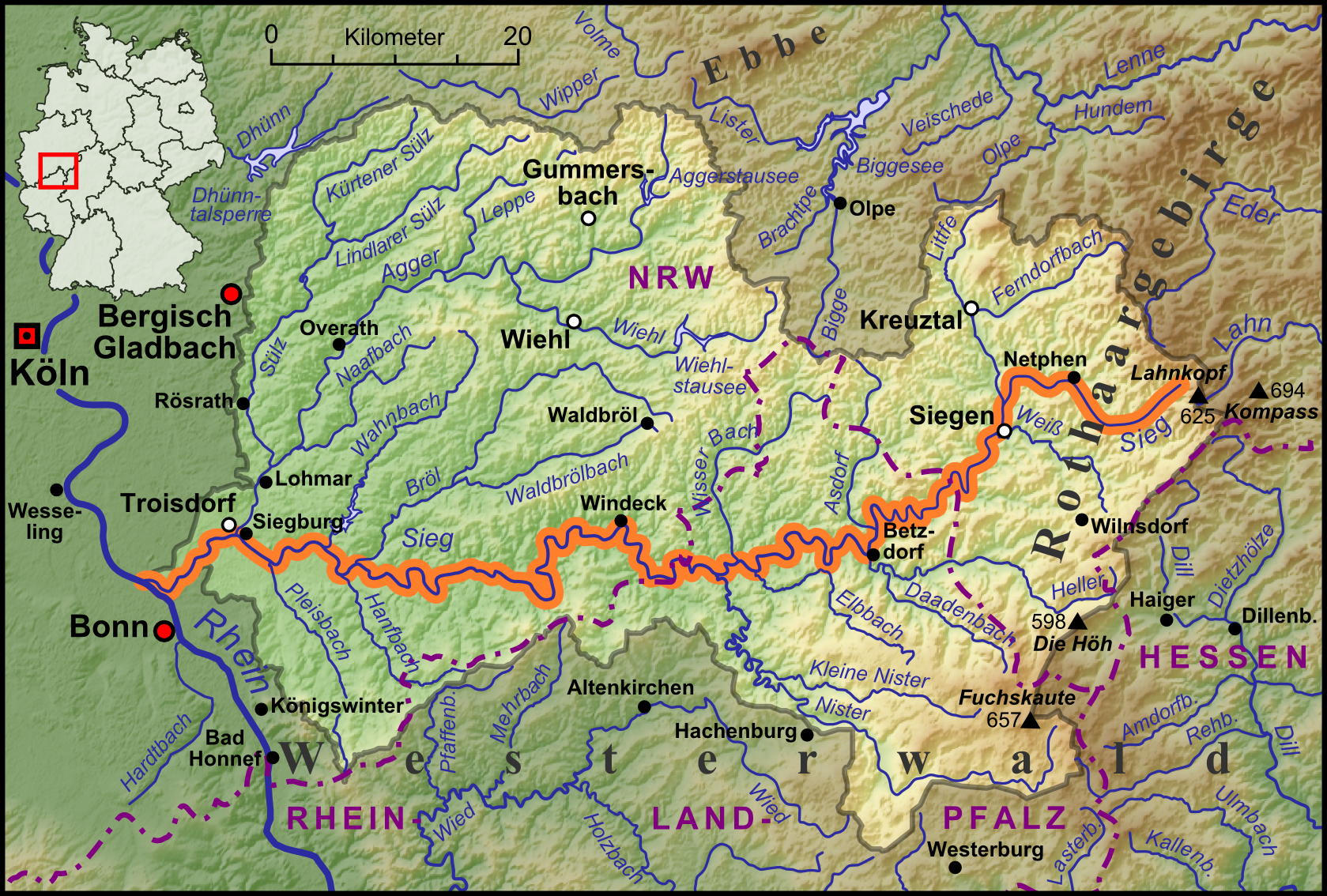
- Drainage basin map of the Sieg

Location
- Country: Germany

Physical characteristics
- Source
  - location: Siegerland
  - elevation: 603 m (1,978 ft)
- Mouth
  - location: Rhine
  - coordinates: 50°46′7″N 7°4′32″E
- Length: 155.1 km (96.4 mi)
- Basin size: 2,857 km^{2} (1,103 sq mi)
- Discharge
  - average: 52 m^{3}/s (1,800 cu ft/s)

Basin features
- Progression: Rhine→ North Sea
- Tributaries
  - left: Heller, Nister
  - right: Bröl, Agger

The Sieg (German pronunciation: [ziːk]) is a river in North Rhine-Westphalia and Rhineland-Palatinate, Germany. It is a right tributary of the Rhine.

The river is named after the Sicambri. It is 155 kilometres (96 mi) in length.

The source is located in the Rothaargebirge mountains. From here the river runs southwestwards to the city of Siegen and the hills of Siegerland, both named after the river. Further west the Sieg valley forms the boundary of the Bergisches Land (northern) and Westerwald (southern). The river finally runs through a protected area east of the city of Bonn.

After passing the cities of Hennef and Siegburg, the river flows into the Rhine at the Naturschutzgebiet Siegaue, a protected area immediately to the northeast of the city of Bonn, near Niederkassel/Mondorf.

== Sieg Spring ==
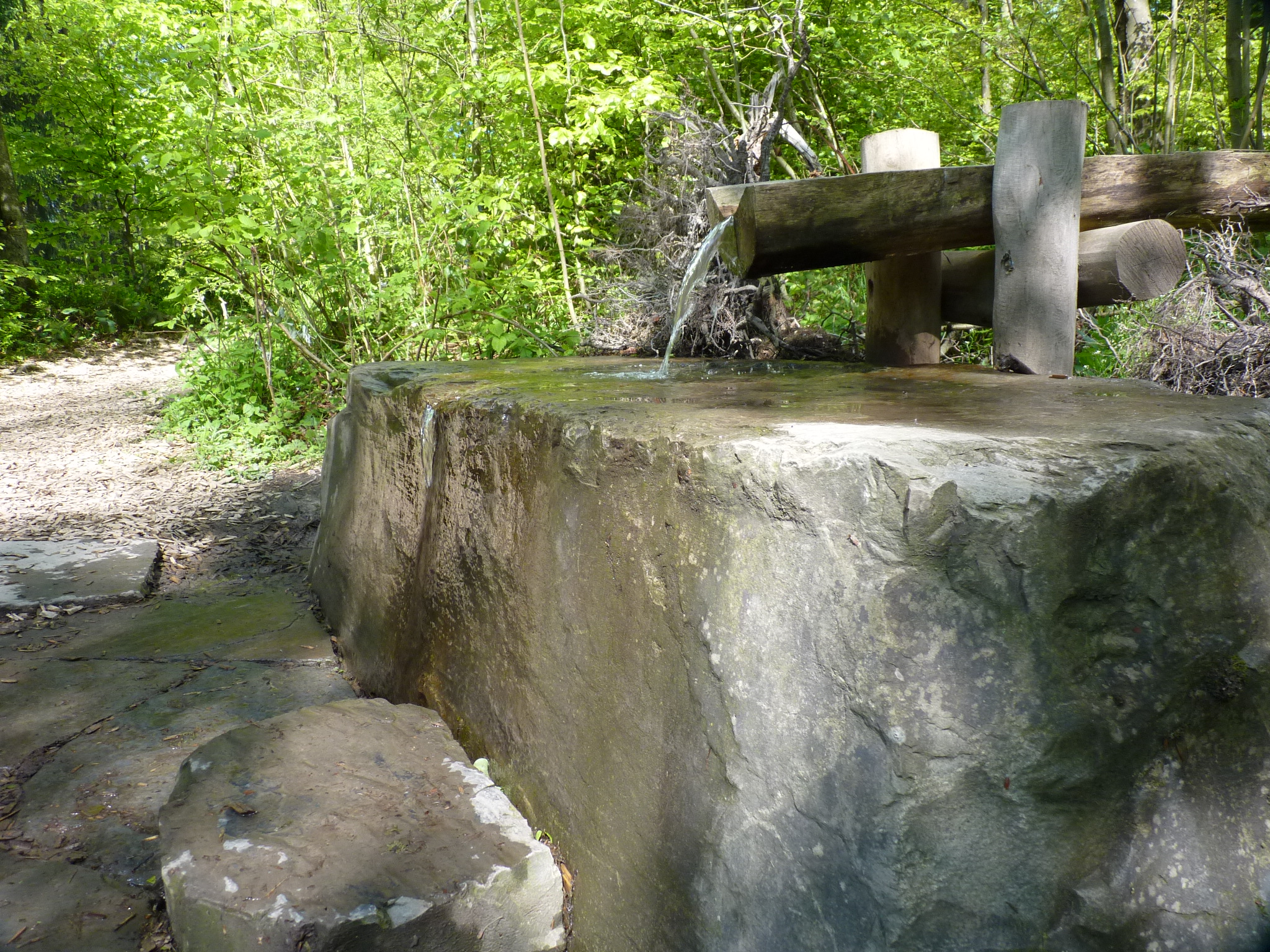
Sieg Spring in May 2014

The Sieg Spring (German: Siegquelle), the source of the Sieg, is at an elevation of 603 metres (1,978 ft), near the village of Großenbach, North Rhine-Westphalia. The location was restored in 2013.

== Tributaries ==
The main tributaries of the Sieg are, from source to mouth:

- Ferndorfbach (right)
- Weiß (left)
- Asdorf (right)
- Heller (left)
- Wisser Bach (right)
- Nister (left)
- Bröl (right)
- Wahnbach (right)
- Pleisbach (left)
- Agger (right)

== See also ==
- List of rivers of North Rhine-Westphalia
- List of rivers of Rhineland-Palatinate
