= Villiper Bach =

River of North Rhine-Westphalia, Germany

Coordinates: 50.6722°N 7.0785°E

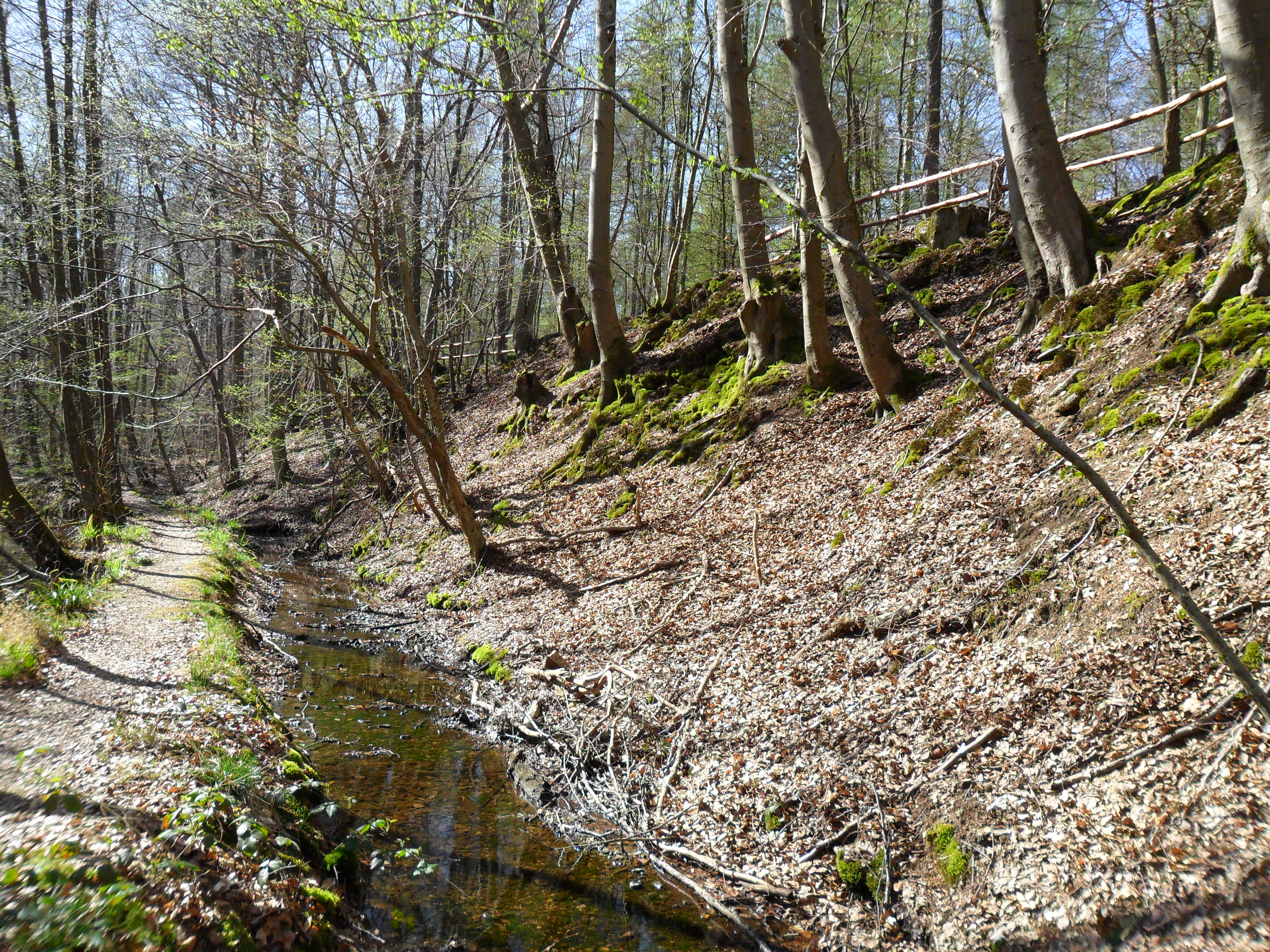

Location
- Country: Germany
- State: North Rhine-Westphalia

Basin features
- Progression: Endenicher Bach→ Hardtbach→ Rhine→ North Sea

Villiper Bach is a river in North Rhine-Westphalia, Germany.

== See also ==
- List of rivers of North Rhine-Westphalia
