= Dietzgen =

Dietzgen is a surname. Notable people with the surname include:

- Joseph Dietzgen (1828–1888), German socialist philosopher, Marxist, and journalist
- Eugene Dietzgen (1862–1929), his son
