= Göttchesbach =

River in Germany

Coordinates: 51.6932°N 7.0766°E

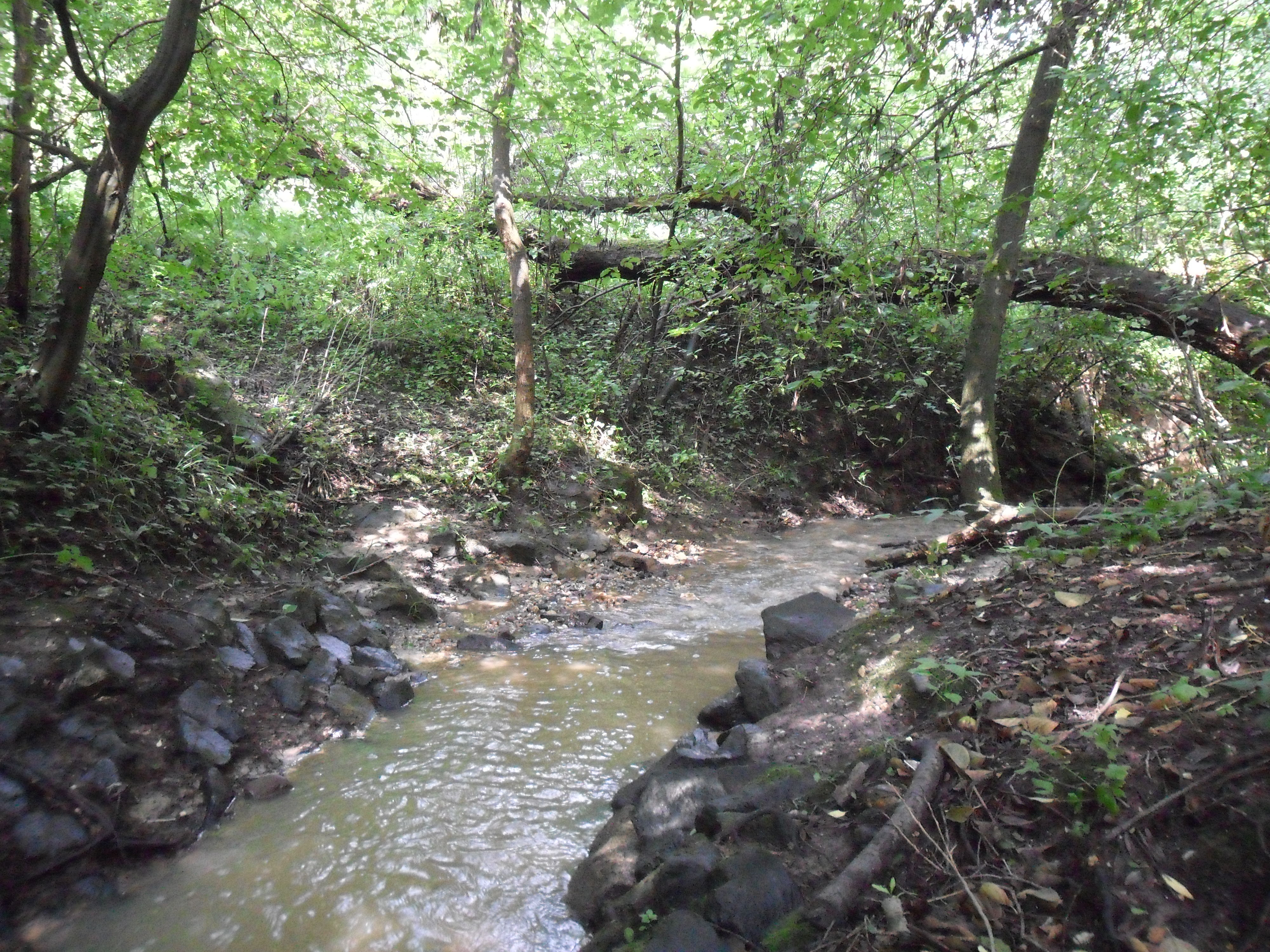

Location
- Country: Germany
- States: North Rhine-Westphalia

Basin features
- Progression: Endenicher Bach→ Hardtbach→ Rhine→ North Sea

Göttchesbach is a river of North Rhine-Westphalia, Germany. It is 4.9 km long and a left tributary of the Katzenlochbach.

== See also ==
- List of rivers of North Rhine-Westphalia
