= Dichbach =

River in Germany

Coordinates: 50°42′32″N 7°02′47″E

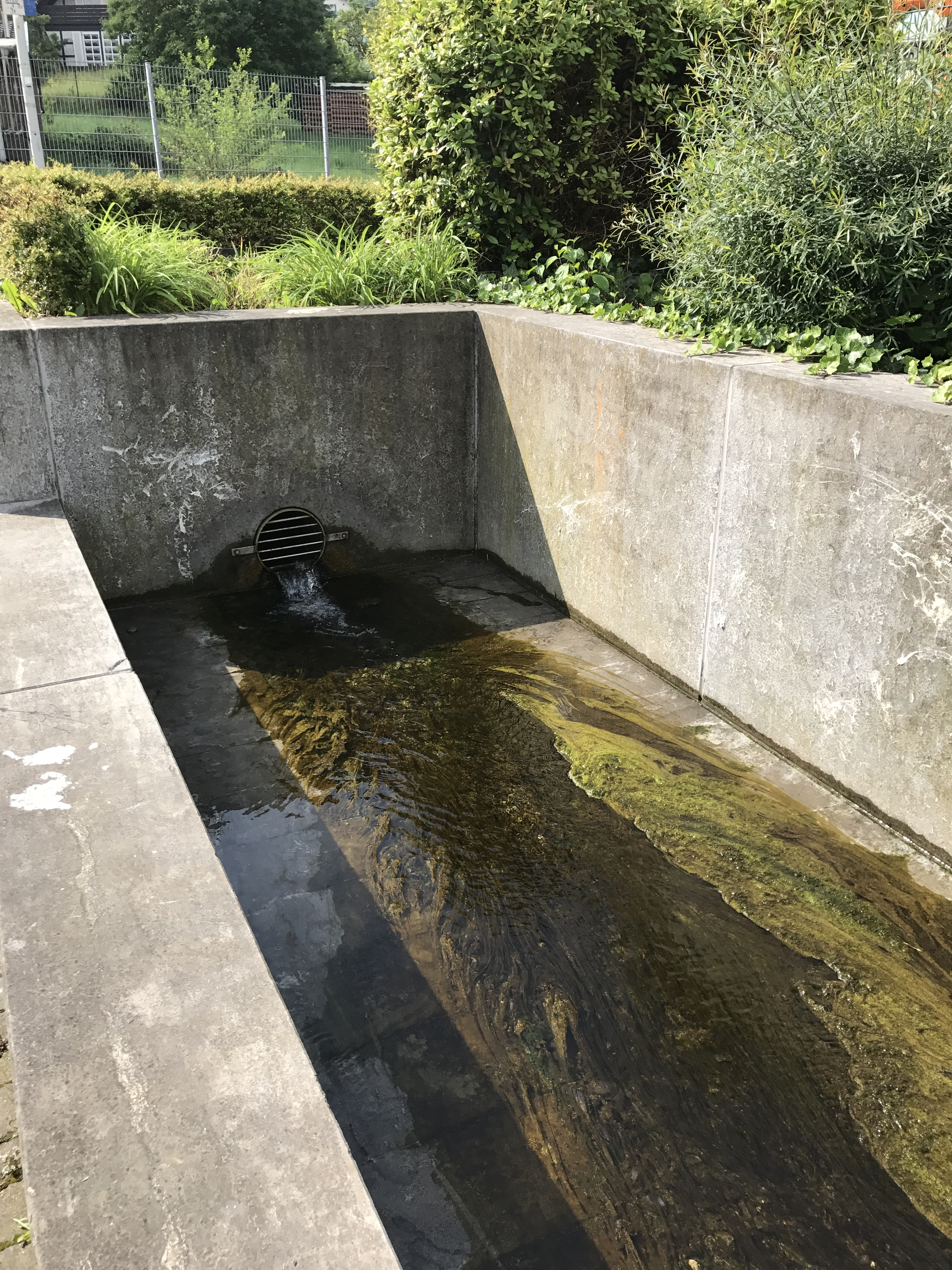

Location
- Country: Germany
- State: North Rhine-Westphalia

Physical characteristics
- Mouth: Heilsbach

Basin features
- Progression: Heilsbach→ Hardtbach→ Rhine→ North Sea

Dichbach is a river of North Rhine-Westphalia, Germany. It is 2.1 km long and a right tributary of the Wahnbach.

== See also ==
- List of rivers of North Rhine-Westphalia
