= Hohnderfeldbach =

River in Germany

Coordinates: 50°42′45″N 7°03′41″E

Location
- Country: Germany
- States: North Rhine-Westphalia

Basin features
- Progression: Endenicher Bach→ Hardtbach→ Rhine→ North Sea

Hohnderfeldbach is a river of North Rhine-Westphalia, Germany that flows through the Lengsdorf district in Bonn. Since the 1970s, the river sparsely flows on account of holes in the piping as well as a Bundesgrenzschutz hall functioning as a receptacle for water.

== See also ==
- List of rivers of North Rhine-Westphalia
