= Wendbach =

River in Germany

Location
- Country: Germany
- State: North Rhine-Westphalia

Physical characteristics
- Mouth
  - location: Wahnbach
  - coordinates: 50.8482°N 7.3213°E

Basin features
- Progression: Wahnbach→ Sieg→ Rhine→ North Sea

Wendbach is a small river of North Rhine-Westphalia, Germany. It is 7.3 km (4.5 mi) long and flows as a left tributary into the Wahnbach near Neunkirchen-Seelscheid.

== See also ==
- List of rivers of North Rhine-Westphalia
