= Hardtbach =

Hardtbach may refer to:

- Hardtbach (Rhine), a river of North Rhine-Westphalia, Germany, left tributary of the Rhine
- Hardtbach, a small river of North Rhine-Westphalia, Germany, left tributary of the Wupper
