= Heilsbach =

River in Germany

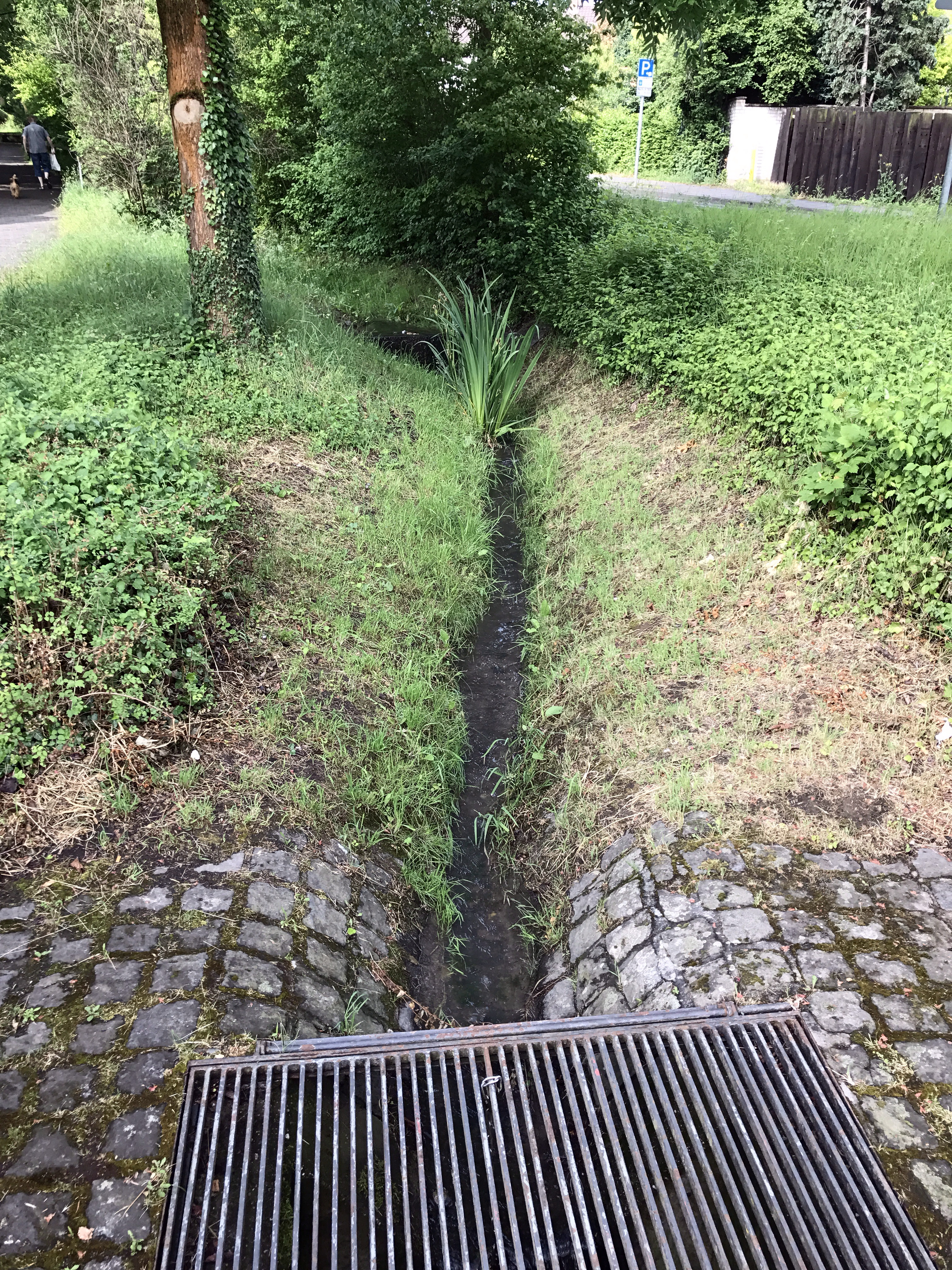
- Heilsbach near Derlestraße (Bonn)

Location
- Country: Germany
- States: North Rhine-Westphalia

Physical characteristics
- Source
  - elevation: 112 m
- Mouth: Hardtbach
  - coordinates: 50°43′16″N 7°02′27″E
  - elevation: 75 m
- Length: 1.8 km

Basin features
- Progression: Hardtbach→ Rhine→ North Sea
- Tributaries
  - right: Dichbach

The Heilsbach is a river of North Rhine-Westphalia, Germany. It flows into the Hardtbach in Bonn-Lessenich.

== See also ==
- List of rivers of North Rhine-Westphalia
