= John Givan Davis Mack =

American engineer (1867–1924)

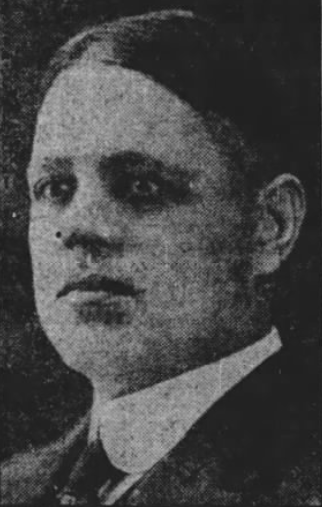
- Born: September 5, 1867; Terre Haute, Indiana
- Died: February 24, 1924 (aged 56); Madison, Wisconsin
- Education: Cornell University
- Occupation(s): Engineer, professor, curator
- Employer: University of Wisconsin

John Givan Davis Mack (September 5, 1867 – February 24, 1924) was a professor of engineering at the University of Wisconsin. He was also curator of the museum of the Wisconsin Historical Society. He was for many years State Chief Engineer.

== Biography ==
John Givan Davis Mack was born in Terre Haute, Indiana on September 5, 1867. He graduated from Cornell University in 1888. In 1893 he started work at the University of Wisconsin as an instructor.

In 1898 he registered the patent of the Mack Improved Mannheim Simplex Slide Rule, which he then assigned to Eugene Dietzgen who put the slide rule into production.

He died from a heart attack in Madison on February 24, 1924. Upon his death, a portrait of Professor Mack was given to the Wisconsin Historical Society Library to mark over thirty years involvement with the university. It was painted by his friend Morton Grenhagen.

== Publications ==
- Efficiency tests of steam engine governors, and the variation in speed, during the single revolution, (1888) with Charles Billings Dix, Cornell University
