= Allner See =

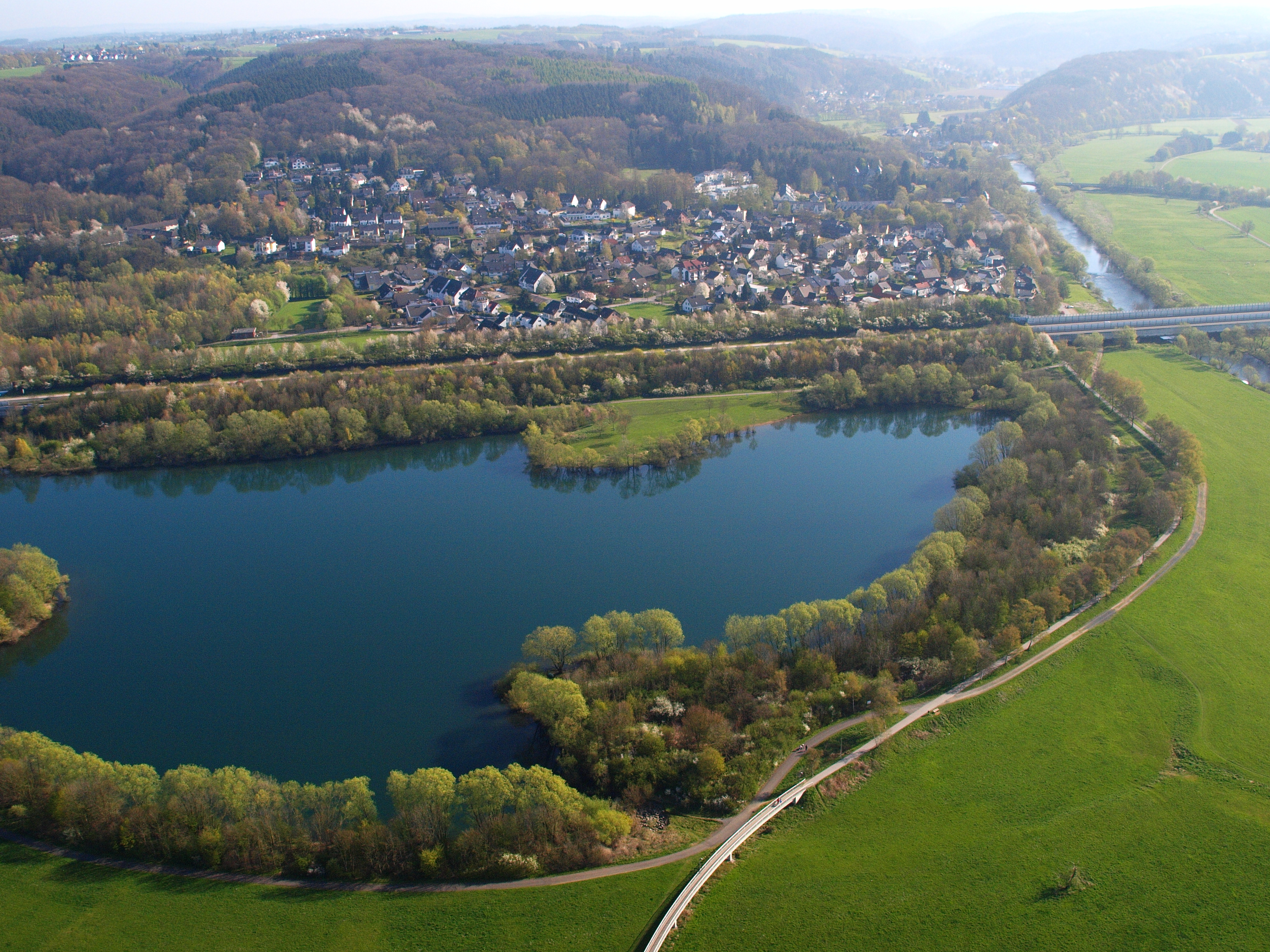

- Location within North Rhine-Westphalia
- Location: Rhein-Sieg-Kreis, North Rhine-Westphalia
- Coordinates: 50°46′45″N 7°17′30″E
- Type: artificial lake
- Primary inflows: none
- Primary outflows: none
- Basin countries: Germany
- Surface area: 0.10 km^{2} (0.039 sq mi)
- Max. depth: 7 m (23 ft)
- Surface elevation: 63.5 m (208 ft)

Allner See is an artificial lake near Hennef in Rhein-Sieg-Kreis, North Rhine-Westphalia, Germany. At an elevation of 63,5 m, its surface area is 0.10 km^{2}. Directly to the north is the 15th century castle Schloss Allner.

Starting in 1979 excavations to obtain sand and gravel for the construction of Highway 560 created a pit some six meters below the water table. In 1986 it was decided by the Hennef town administration to create a lake, and embankments and protection strips were built. In 1990 trees were planted and landscaping was finished just as the highway was completed, producing the lake in its current form. The lake has been stocked with fish for anglers. Swimming is allowed as well as stand-up paddling. But other water sports are prohibited.

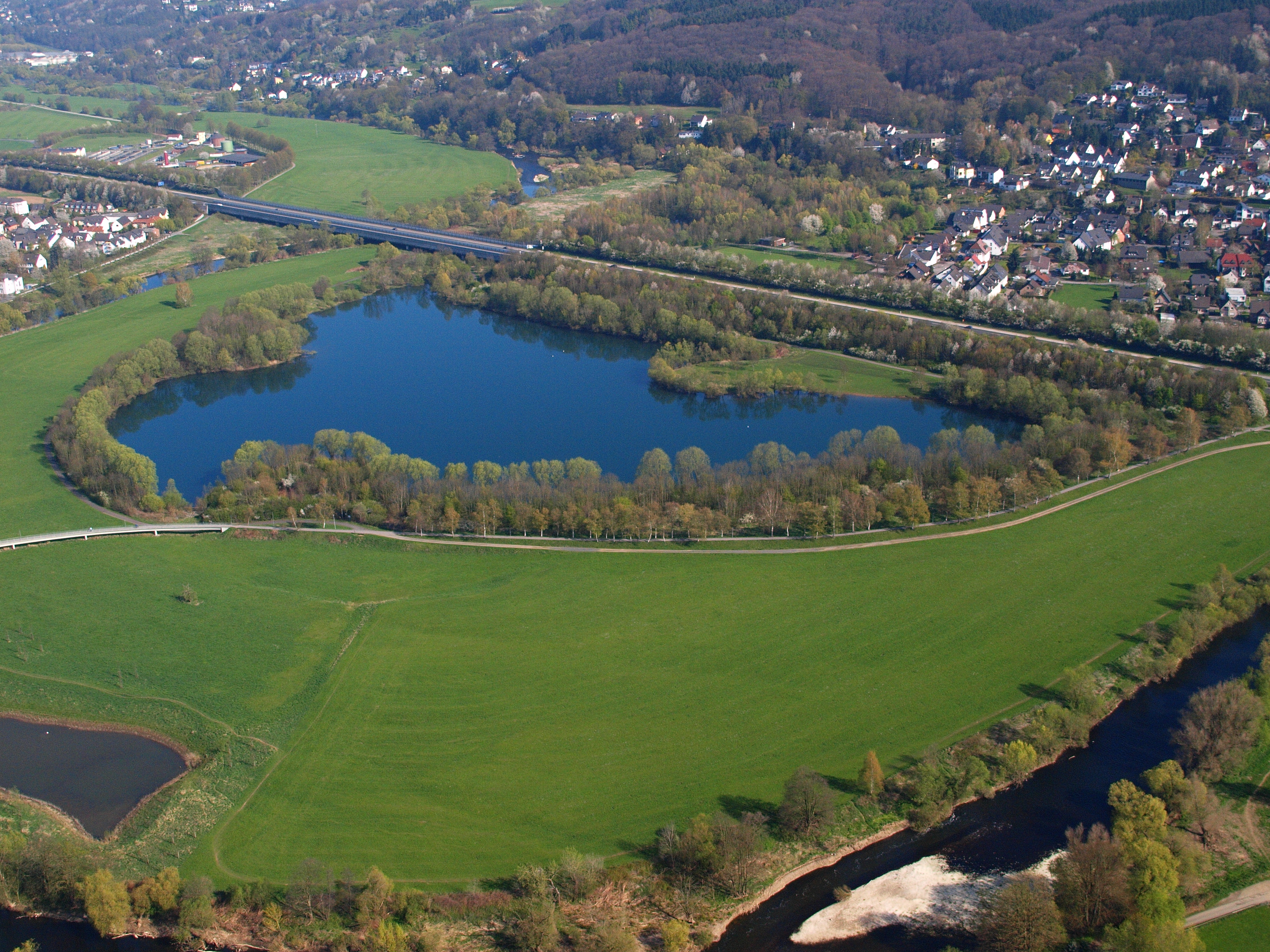
