= Walter von Loë =

Prussian general (1828–1908)

Freiherr Walter von Loë
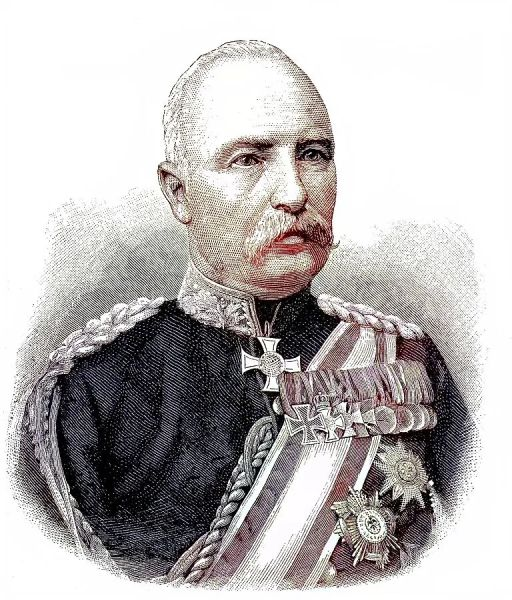
- Born: 9 September 1828; Hennef, Rhine Province, Kingdom of Prussia
- Died: 6 July 1908 (aged 79); Bonn, Kingdom of Prussia, German Empire
- Military career
- Allegiance: Kingdom of Prussia; German Empire
- Branch: Prussian Army; Imperial German Army
- Service years: 1845–1897
- Rank: Generalfeldmarshall
- Conflicts: First Schleswig War; Austro-Prussian War; Franco-Prussian War
- Awards: Order of the Black Eagle; Iron Cross

Friedrich Karl Walter Degenhard Freiherr von Loë (9 September 1828 – 6 July 1908) was a Prussian soldier and aristocrat. Loë had the distinction of being one of the few Roman Catholics to reach the rank of Generalfeldmarschall (field marshal) in the Prussian and imperial German armies.

== Biography ==
Walter was born on 9 September 1828 in Schloss Allner, Hennef, to Baron Maximilian von Loë (1801–1850), a chamberlain in the Prussian royal court and chief administrator of the Sieg district in the Rhine Province, and his first wife, Countess Helene von Hatzfeldt-Werther-Schönstein (1801–1838). The House of Loë was an ancient Catholic noble family of Westphalian origin, who was raised to the status of baron of the Holy Roman Empire in 1629. Walter had two younger brothers: Engelbert (1833–1904), and Otto (1835–1892), who would later become a member of the Reichstag.

=== Military career ===
In his youth, Loë was educated at the Ritterakademie in Bedburg until 1845, when he served his required year in the military and was transferred to the reserves. After graduating from the academy, he studied at Bonn University. Loë was not to stay at the university for long, however, as war with Denmark broke out over a border dispute known as the Schleswig-Holstein Question. The duchies of Schleswig and Holstein, located along the Danish border, were claimed by both Prussia and Denmark. When German Schleswig-Holsteiners rebelled, Prussia and other German states sent forces to intervene. Loë served as a lieutenant of German cavalry during the conflict, eventually transferring to the Prussian 3rd Hussars.

In 1851, the war with Denmark concluded with an agreement, the 1852 London Protocol, which allowed the Danes to retain Schleswig-Holstein. Loë remained in the military, however, fighting rebels in Baden before becoming adjutant of Prussia's Army Riding School. A major by 1861, Loë became an aide-de-camp to King William I of Prussia, serving in this capacity for one year, upon which he accompanied the King's brother, Prince Albert, to the Caucasus. In 1863, Loë was appointed military attaché to the French army in Algeria; whilst in North Africa, he participated in a French campaign against Arab rebels.

Returning to Prussia, Loë was transferred to the army's Grand Headquarters, seeing action in the Battle of Königgrätz. He was promoted firstly to lieutenant colonel (1867) and then to full colonel (1868), and commanded the Seventh Hussars during the Franco-Prussian War, after which Germany was unified under William, now Emperor of the entire German nation. Loë's forces performed satisfactorily during the war, and he advanced to the level of brigade commander. Serving in both command and staff roles, Loë—having succeeded to his father's title of baron—rose to major general and then to lieutenant general. He became the commander of the 5th Division in 1879, and served from 1880 to 1884 as Prussian adjutant general, after which he was given command of the VIII Army Corps.

In February 1893, Loë was sent to Rome as Germany's liaison to the Holy See, meeting with Pope Leo XIII. Upon his successful completion of this diplomatic mission, Loë was made colonel general of the cavalry. After spending two years in charge of the cavalry branch, he was promoted to field marshal on 1 January 1905, becoming one of the few Catholics to receive this highest rank after service in the Protestant-dominated Prussian army. Additionally, Loë was made Commander-in-chief of the Marches (German: Oberbefehlshaber in den Marken) and Governor of Berlin.

=== Later life ===
In 1897, the field marshal retired from military service due to ill health, although he retained his positions as adjutant general and emissary. He was further appointed a member of the Prussian House of Lords for life in 1900, after completing another diplomatic mission. He died on 6 July 1908 of complications from a lung catarrh in Bonn.

== Marriage and issue ==
On 24 May 1859, Loë married his distant cousin Franziska von Nimptsch, née Countess Hatzfeldt zu Trachenberg (1833–1922), who had three children of her own from a previous marriage. The couple had three children: Helene (1860–1902), and twins Margarethe (1866–1943) and Hubert (1866–1897).

== Catholic faith ==
Loë's promotion to field marshal was exceptional in that this honour was rarely given to Catholics. Traditionally a Protestant state, Prussia allowed few Catholics to rise that high in rank. Despite his beliefs, Loë supported practices such as dueling, often embracing the traditions of Prussian Protestant officers.

Loë's faith, as well as his connection to the House of Hatzfeldt, would also bring him into conflict with Imperial Chancellor Otto von Bismarck, who spearheaded the anti-Catholic Kulturkampf during the 1870s. Bismarck was among those involved in the affair between his son Herbert and Princess Elisabeth von Carolath-Beuthen, the latter of whom was Loë's sister-in-law.

== Honours and awards ==
- The Loestraße in Südstadt, Bonn, is named in his honour.

=== Orders and decorations ===
- Prussia:
  - Knight of the Red Eagle, 4th Class with Swords, 1862; 3rd Class with Bow, 1864; 2nd Class with Oak Leaves and Swords on Ring, 18 January 1875; 1st Class with Enamel Band of the Royal Crown Order, 23 September 1884; Grand Cross, 17 March 1888
  - Knight's Cross of the Royal House Order of Hohenzollern, with Swords, 20 September 1866; Grand Commander's Cross (50 years) with Star and Swords on Ring, 7 April 1897
  - Service Award Cross
  - Iron Cross (1870), 1st Class with 2nd Class on Black Band
  - Knight of the Royal Crown Order, 2nd Class with Star, 20 September 1876; 1st Class, 22 March 1883
  - Knight of the Black Eagle, 20 September 1890; with Collar, 17 January 1891
  - Knight of Merit of the Prussian Crown, 18 January 1901
- Hohenzollern: Cross of Honour of the Princely House Order of Hohenzollern, 1st Class
- Hanover: Royal Guelphic Order, 4th Class, 1857
- Russia:
  - Knight of St. Anna, 2nd Class in Diamonds, with Swords and Crown, 21 December 1862; 1st Class
  - Knight of St. Vladimir, 4th Class
- France: Grand Officer of the Legion of Honour, 10 September 1864
- Ottoman Empire: Order of Osmanieh, 3rd Class
- Bavaria: Grand Cross of the Military Merit Order
- Belgium: Grand Officer of the Order of Leopold, 14 March 1874; Grand Cordon (military)
- Sweden-Norway: Commander Grand Cross of the Sword, 7 July 1874
- (Austrian Empire) (Kingdom of Hungary) Austria-Hungary:
  - Grand Cross of the Order of Franz Joseph, 1877
  - Knight of the Iron Crown, 1st Class, 1881
  - Grand Cross of the Royal Hungarian Order of St. Stephen, 1893; in Brilliants, 1899
- (Saxe-Coburg and Gotha) (Duchy of Saxe-Altenburg) (Saxe-Meiningen) Ernestine duchies: Grand Cross of the Saxe-Ernestine House Order, 1881
- Spain: Grand Cross of the Order of Charles III, 3 December 1883
- Grand Duchy of Hesse: Grand Cross of the Ludwig Order, 15 November 1890
- Luxembourg: Knight of the Gold Lion of Nassau
- Netherlands: Grand Cross of the Netherlands Lion
- Persia: Order of the Lion and the Sun, 1st Class
- Italy: Grand Cross of the Crown of Italy
- Holy See: Knight of the Supreme Order of Christ, February 1893 – during his diplomatic visit to the Vatican
- Saxe-Weimar-Eisenach: Grand Cross of the White Falcon, 1893
- Saxony: Knight of the Rue Crown, 1895
- Württemberg: Grand Cross of the Württemberg Crown, 1895
- Baden: Knight of the House Order of Fidelity, 14 April 1897

=== Military appointments ===
- À la suite of the 7th (1st Rhenish) Hussars "King William I"

=== Honorary citizenships and doctorates ===
- Honorary Citizen of the City of Bonn, 1897
- Honorary Doctorate from the Rheinische Friedrich-Wilhelms University, 8 July 1908

== Bibliography ==
- von Deines, Adolf (1876). Das Königs-Husaren-Regiment (1 Rheinisches) Nr. 7 von der Formation des Stammregiments bis zur Gegenwart (in German). Berlin: E. S. Mittler und Sohn.
- "Loë, Friedrich Karl Walter Degenhard, Freiherr von". Meyers Konversations-Lexikon (in German). 10 (4 ed.). Leipzig, Vienna: Verlag des Bibliographisches Institut: 866. 1885–1892.
- Stumpf, Reinhard (1987). Loë, Walter Freiherr. Vol. 15. Berlin: Duncker & Humblot. p. 14. ISBN 3-428-00196-6.
- Schlözer, Leopold von (1914). Generalfeldmarschall Freiherr von Loe. Ein militärisches Zeit- und Lebensbild (in German). Stuttgart, Berlin: Deutsche Verlags-Anstalt.
