= Schloss Allner =

Castle in Rhein-Sieg-Kreis, Germany

- Near Hennef in Germany
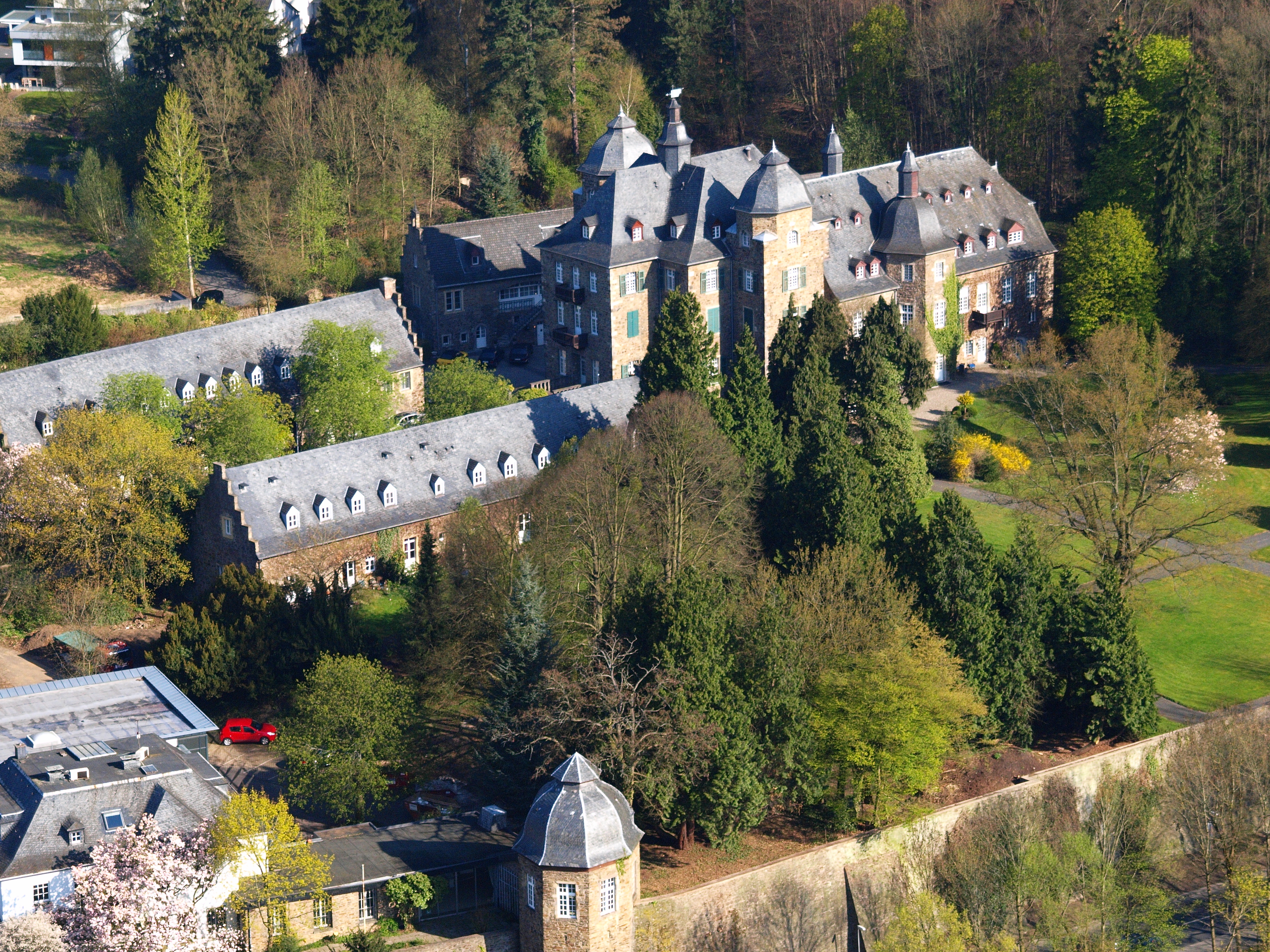
- Schloss Allner seen from above in 2010.

Site information
- Owner: Franz Schilke
- Open to the public: No
- Condition: Restored

Location
- Coordinates: 50°46′51.3″N 7°18′06.1″E

Site history
- Built: Early 15th century
- Built by: Merkelsbach family
- Demolished: 1945 (partial demolition)
- Events: Assault by US troops on April 7–8, 1945

Schloss Allner is a fifteenth-century castle in Rhein-Sieg-Kreis, North Rhine-Westphalia, Germany. It is located on the southern slope of the Nutscheid Ridge, on the north bank of the River Sieg, and just northeast of the Allner See. It lies to the northeast of the town of Hennef, east of the district of Allner.

During its history it has served as a residence, a municipal seat and an orphanage. During World War II it was the scene of an unsuccessful attempt by the Wehrmacht to halt the advancing Allied forces from crossing the Sieg and entering the Ruhr Valley.

== Description ==
Formerly surrounded by a moat, the buildings of the cross-shaped four-story mansion, with rectangular towers in the front corners, are crowned by a central lantern roof dating back to the mid-17th century. The front entrance has an 18th-century imperial staircase, edged with balustrades made of trachyte, flanking the original round-arched doorway within a rectangular aperture designed to receive a raised drawbridge. On either side of this lower entrance are sandstone escutcheons bearing the coat of arms of the Merode family. Two octagonal towers flank the great hall.

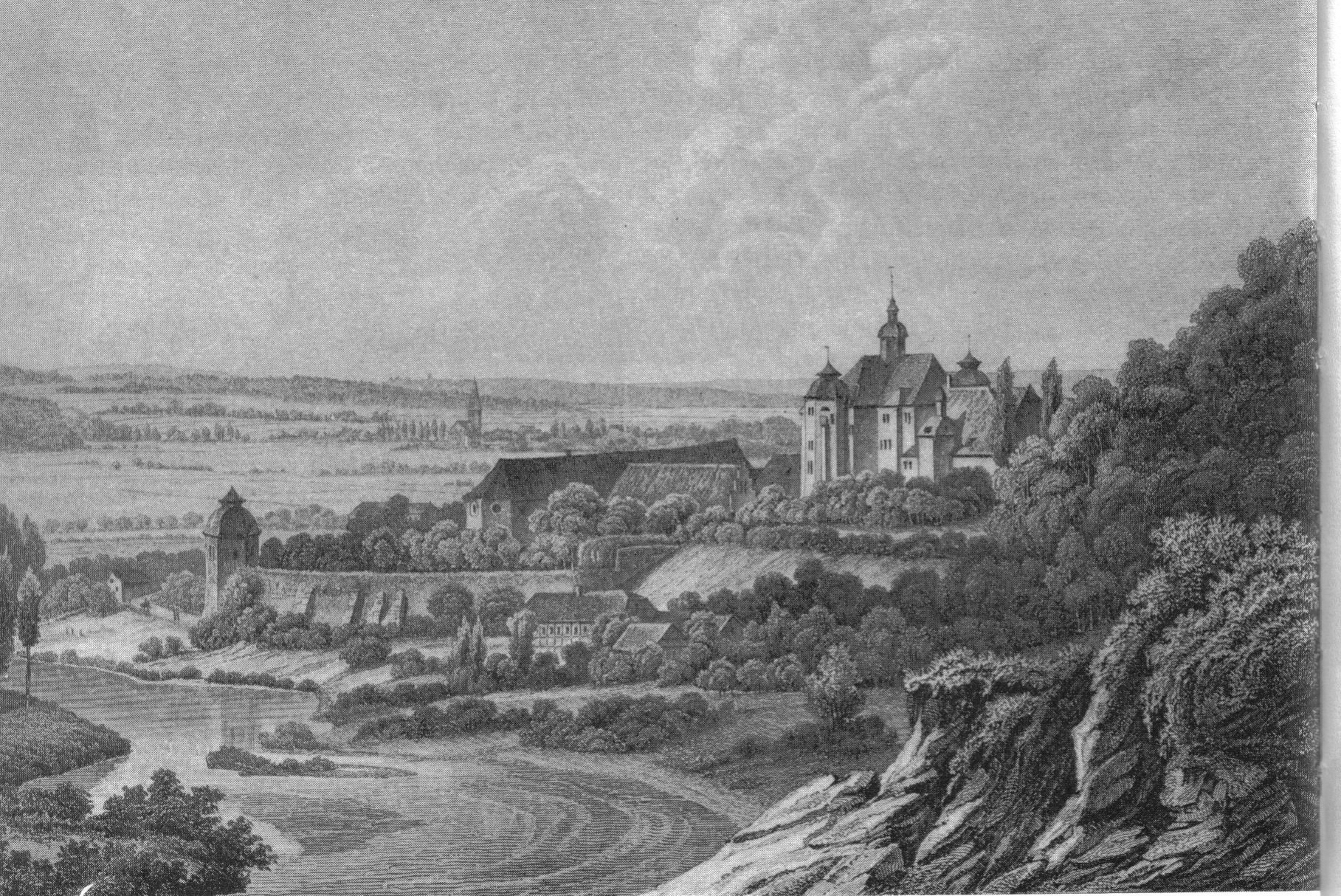
Schloss Allner in 1850, seen from the east

In the great hall, the two fireplaces are decorated with the Scheiffart family coat of arms. A stone staircase with a carved oak banister leads to the chapel on the second floor of the manor. The basement area contains a kitchen and a wine cellar with 18th century wood paneling and wall cabinets, and a low vaulted ceiling. A round-arched cellar door bears the date 1667 on its keystone and has a carved stone face for the insertion of a deadbolt.

Outside the manor's front doorway is a Baroque arched portal, bearing the Merkelsbach family coat of arms and brackets for a narrow drawbridge. To the west stand two long stone outbuildings with crow-stepped gables, dating to the 16th century, which contain servant's quarters and stables. A third outbuilding was constructed in the 17th century on the castle's north side to serve as the forester's residence.

On the lower grounds near the river a three-story octagonal tower, built in 1550, is located on the 10-meter-high Ashlar curtain wall. Within the wall, to the north of the tower, is a glass-domed 17th century garden house. The castle's main gate consists of a red sandstone archway with a lion mask in the keystone and a marriage coat of arms of Bertram Scheiffart von Merode and Lucie von Hatzfeldt, dated 1643. On a northwest section of the wall is a second marriage escutcheon commemorating the wedding of Johann Wallraff Scheiffart von Merode and Maria Anna von Harff, dated 1668.

== History ==
The original cruciform structure was built sometime around 1419. It first appears in historical records in 1421, mentioned as being in the possession of Arnold von Merkelsbach, vassal of Stifts Vilich and the bailiff of the Blankenberg Office of the Duchy of Berg.

In 1557 the ownership went by marriage to Wallraff Scheiffart von Merode, also called von Kühlseggen. In 1643, Bertram Scheiffart von Merode expanded the core building of the manor, adding the great hall and the two rear towers. At the end of the 17th century possession went by marriage to Daniel Salentin Spies von Büllesheim. At the end of the 18th century, a dispute settlement at the Imperial Chamber Court had the castle (and also Schloss Merten and Schloss Schönstein) handed over to Franz Ludwig von Hatzfeldt. He spent several months at Schloss Allner every year.

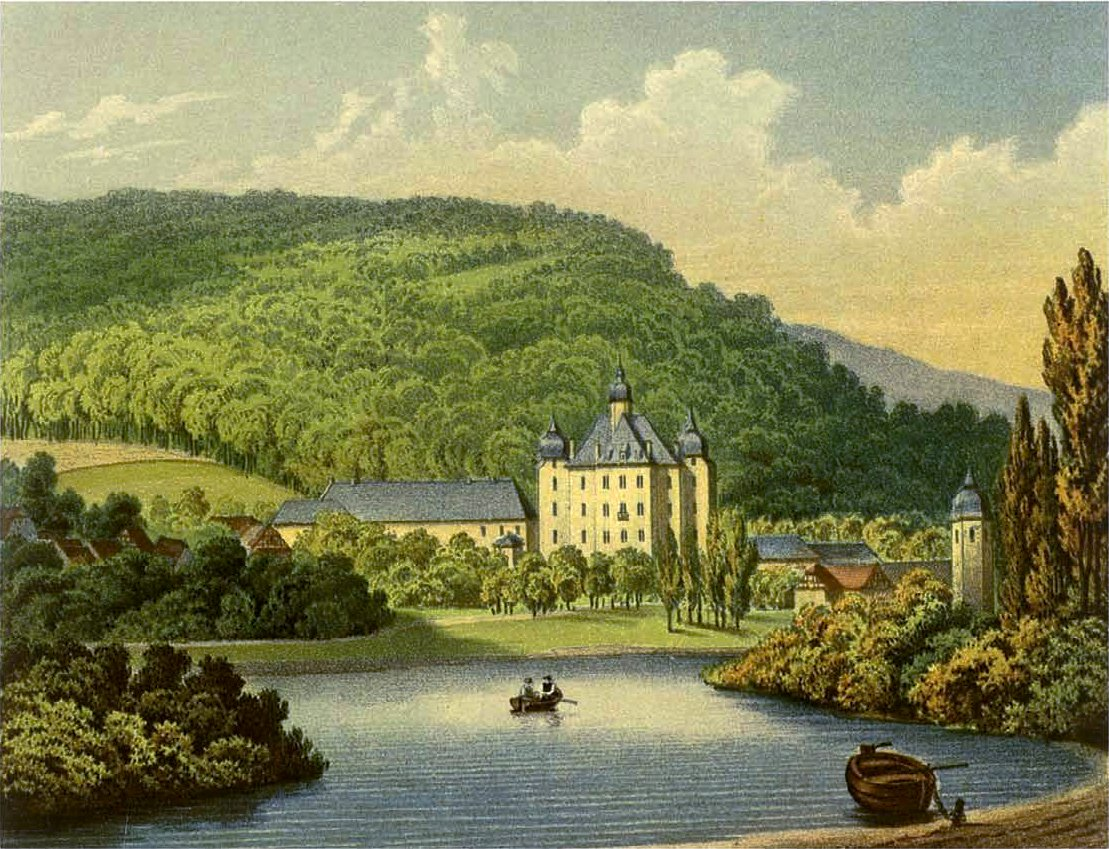
Schloss Allner seen from the west sometime between 1857 and 1875

His son-in-law, Clemens von Loë succeeded him as owner of the castle. The Prussian general Walter von Loë was born in Schloss Allner on September 9, 1828. From 1837 to 1848 Maximilian von Loë was district administrator of Siegburg and Schloss Allner became the seat of the district office. After his death in 1850, his heirs left the castle and it stood empty for twenty years.

In 1870 the Düsseldorf ophthalmologist Albert Mooren bought the castle and it was rebuilt in 1875-6 by the Franciscan brother Paschalis Gratzke in the Gothic Revival style. Gratzke added steeply pitched concave Mansard roofs on both the front towers and a third roof which joined the two towers flanking the great hall. He also removed a balcony over the front door and added a terrace and a staircase on the northwest side facing the garden.

In 1883 the castle was sold to the industrialist Philipp Heinrich Cockerill, whose daughter Lucy moved into the castle in 1884 with her husband, the writer Count Alfred Adelmann von Adelmannsfelden. Their only daughter Irma was born in the castle in 1884. She lived there from 1923 with her husband, ophthalmologist Adolf Pagenstecher who became the castle's owner. In 1928 their daughter Lucy was born in the castle and baptized in the chapel.

=== World War II ===
On 7 April 1945 the US 97th Infantry Division attempted to cross the Sieg River just south of Schloss Allner. Two Wehrmacht officers and a small group of soldiers from the 353rd Infantry Division of the LVIII. Panzerkorps positioned machine guns in the towers of Schloss Allner and opened fire on the Americans as they launched boats into the river.

According to the after action report:

"Machine-gun fire was strafing the crossing area from castle ALLNER where it had a clear field of fire and from a wooded spur at a bend in the river W of the crossing, firing upriver toward the boats. Artillery fire, TD's, heavy MG fire and mortars were all brought to bear on this castle but although it crumbled, the MG fire continued. Fire was also coming from the high ground N of the river."

In two days the 922nd Field Artillery Battalion fired over three thousand 105 mm rounds at the area around the castle. After crossing the river, elements of the 387th Infantry Regiment assaulted the castle:

"The 2d Battalion hit very stiff resistance at the ALLNER Castle and on the ridge in the loop of the river. Anti-tank company and the TD's blasted the castle from the S bank of the SIEG River and G Company was able to clear it out."

The castle was heavily damaged by mortars, artillery and small arms fire before the Americans finally took possession of it on 8 April. The front corner tower on the south side of the manor sustained a direct hit from US artillery and was almost completely destroyed. John Rosauer estimates that ten US soldiers were killed in the assault, but there are no estimates of German military casualties.

=== Orphanage scandal ===
In 1950 Lucy Pagenstecher married Rainer C. Horstmann, mayor of the municipality of Lauthausen from 1956 to 1969. Horstmann sold the castle for the symbolic price of one Deutschmark to the Bonn Caritas Association, a Catholic charity. From 1953 to 1973 the castle was used as an orphanage, the Cockerill Children's Home, staffed by Catholic nuns of the order "Schwestern vom kostbaren Blut" (Sisters of the Precious Blood).

Extensive renovations to repair damage from the war were completed in 1962, replacing the mansard roofs with tented roofs.

In the 1960s complaints began to surface in regard to the care of the 120 mostly illegitimate children living at the orphanage. On 12 April 1965 an inspection revealed overcrowding, poor sanitation and severe mistreatment of children in the home. Children were malnourished and showed signs of jaundice and beatings. Some were believed to have died from abuse and neglect. Although there were no explicit reports of sexual abuse, the investigation found that girls were occasionally removed from the orphanage on weekends and were "completely distraught" upon their return. The report did not recommend any follow-up action and none was taken until the early 1970s. A series of investigations and indictments led to the closure of the orphanage in 1973, at which time all of the orphanage's records were destroyed.

In 2010 a report based on interviews of 35 former residents and employees of the orphanage described children being tied to their beds and a chronic lack of trained staff. Former residents reported signs of psychological trauma including panic attacks and depression.

Schloss Allner remained empty for the next 11 years, suffering devastation and looting of the interior. In 1983 the Hennef town council had the doors and windows boarded up to prevent further vandalism.

== Present day ==
The castle was purchased in 1984 by Professor Franz Schilke. Condominiums were built on the sprawling grounds known as "The Schlosspark" outside the walls of the castle. In 2010 a bridge was constructed to the castle's well-preserved watermill. Now located at Schloßstraße, Schloss Allner is a private residential estate.

== Gallery ==
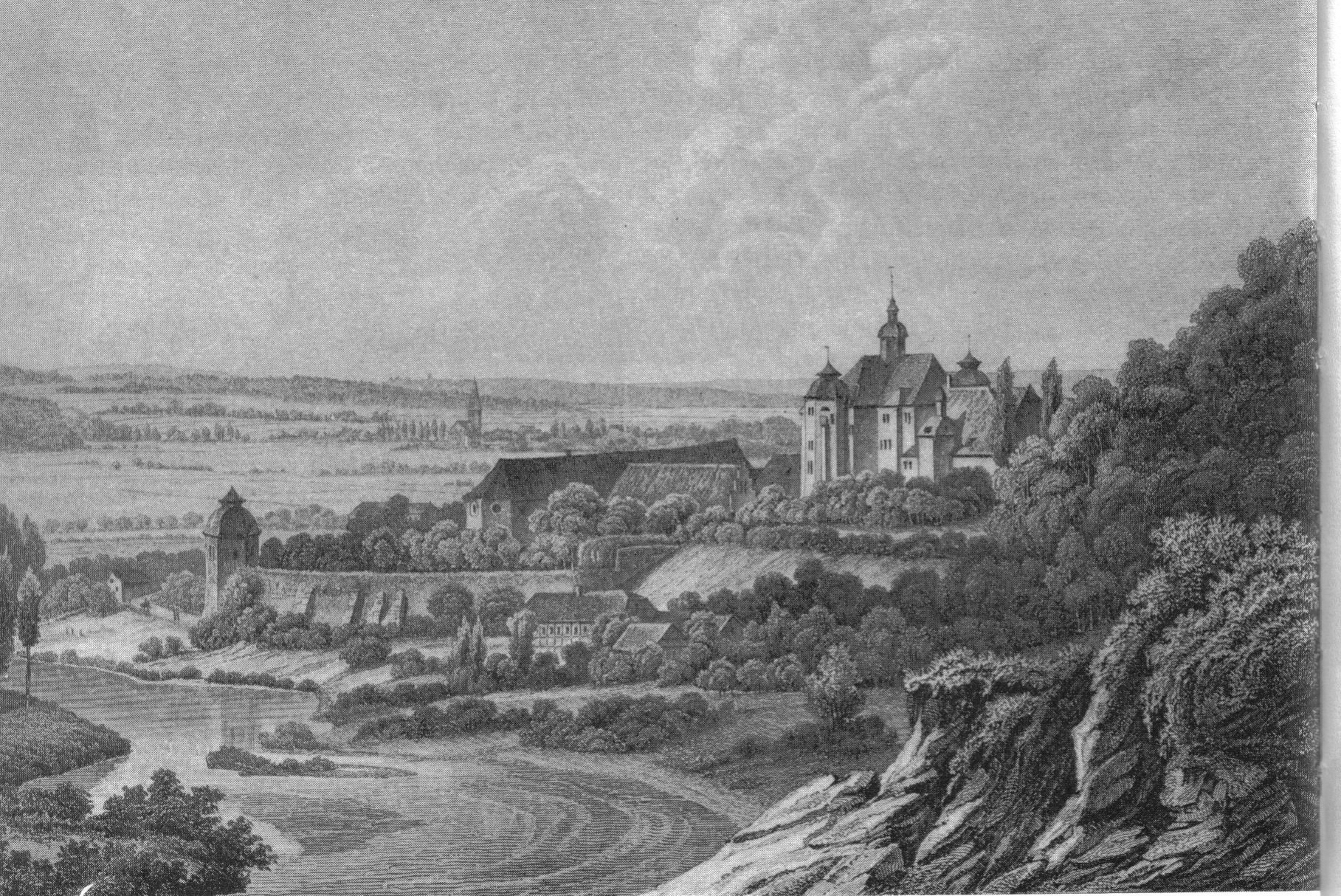
Schloss Allner in 1850. Engraving by Christian Hohe.

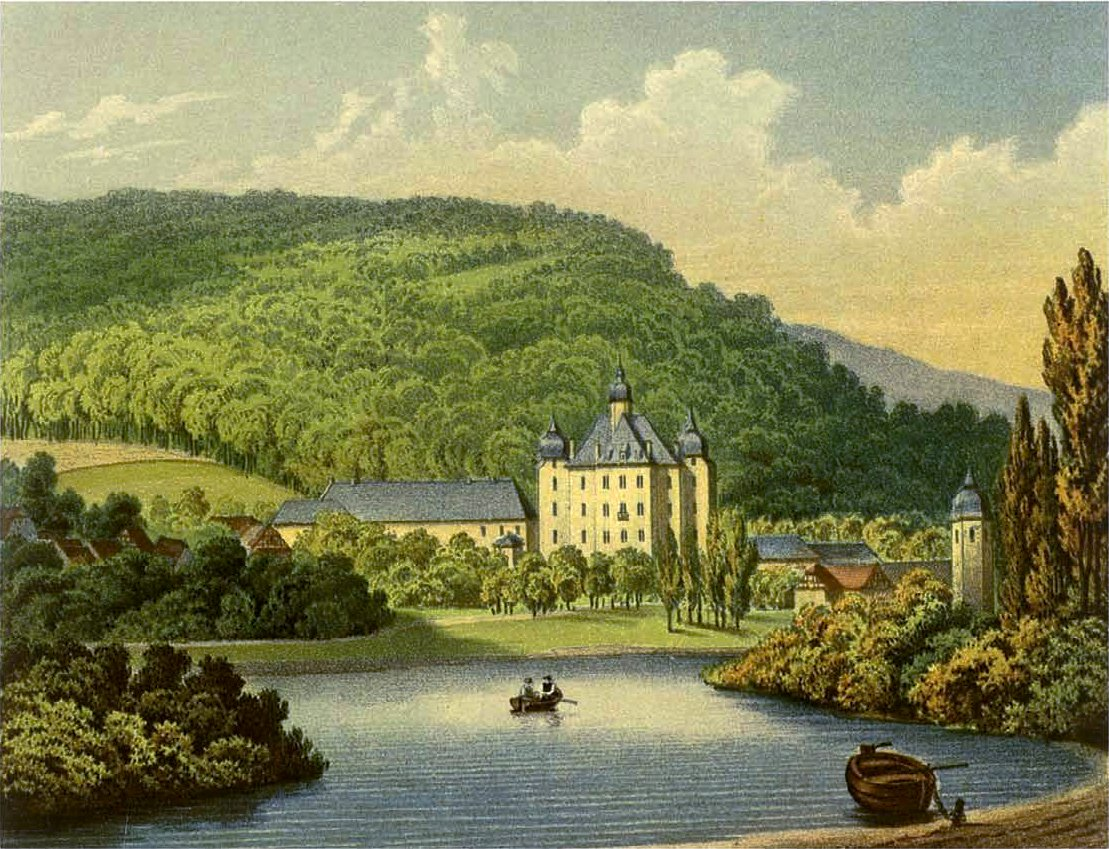
Schloss Allner between 1857 and 1875.

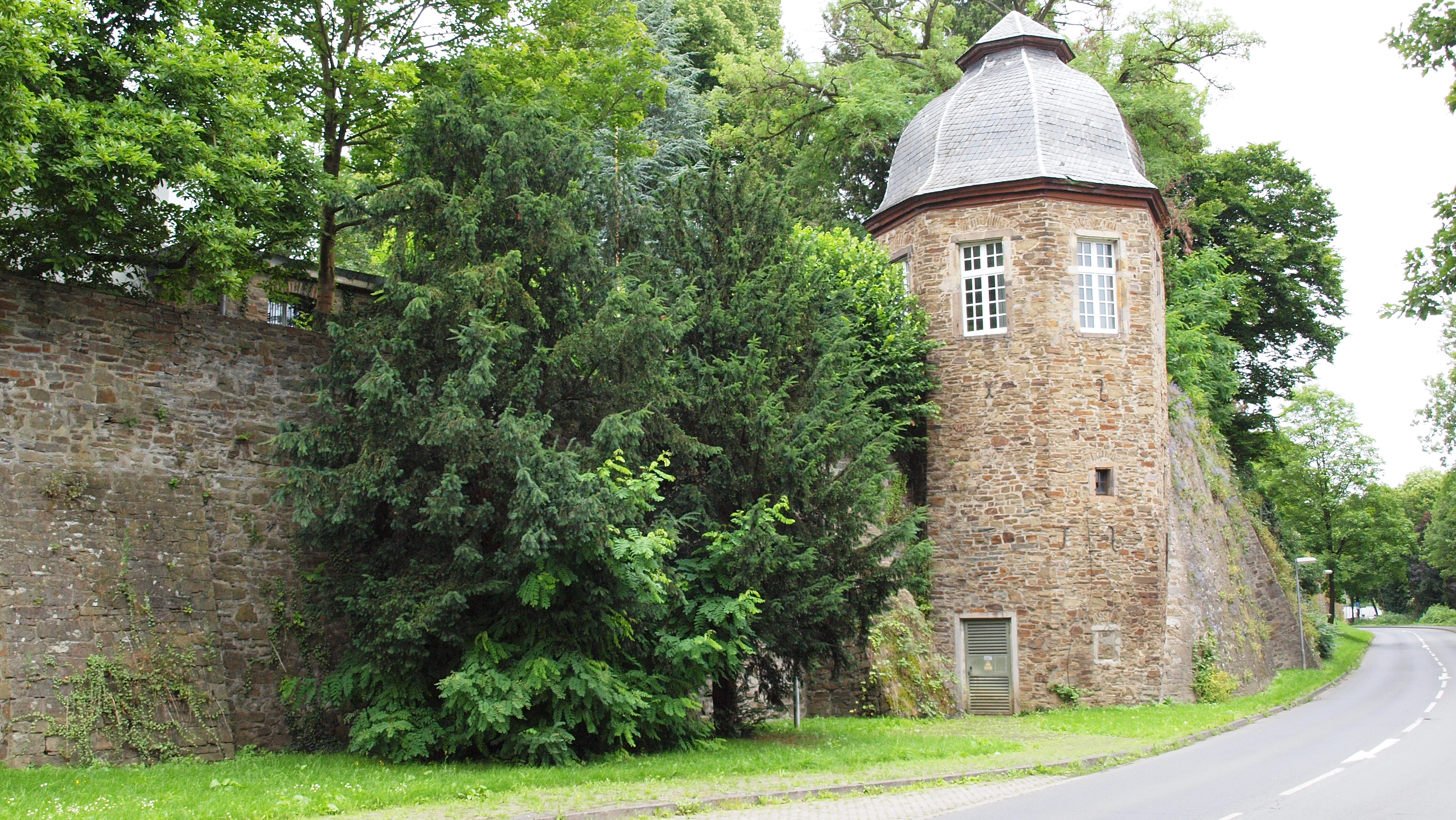
Octagonal tower on the curtain wall near the river, built in 1550.

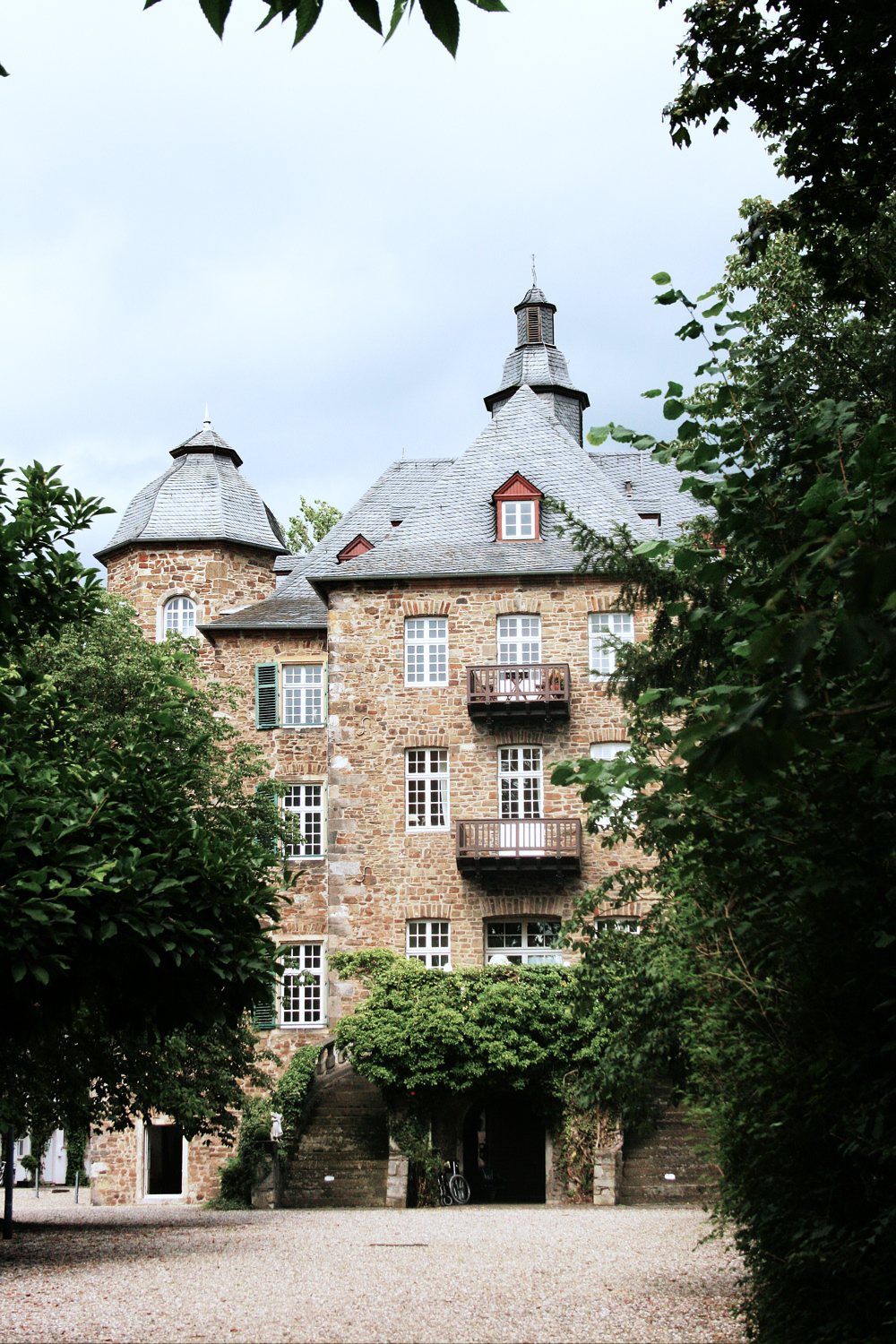
Front entrance with imperial staircase.

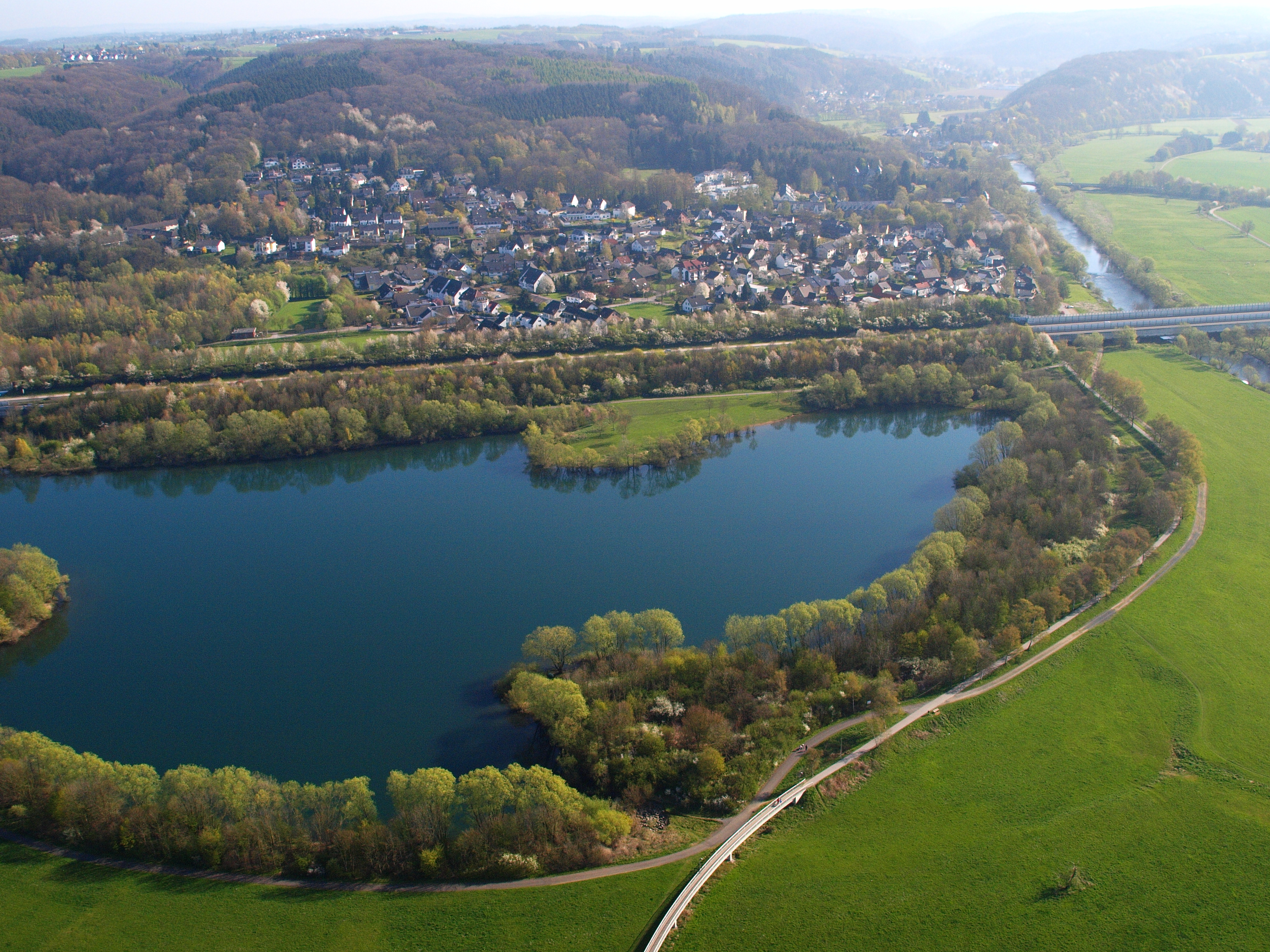
Schloss Allner from above (upper right) with the Allner See in the foreground.

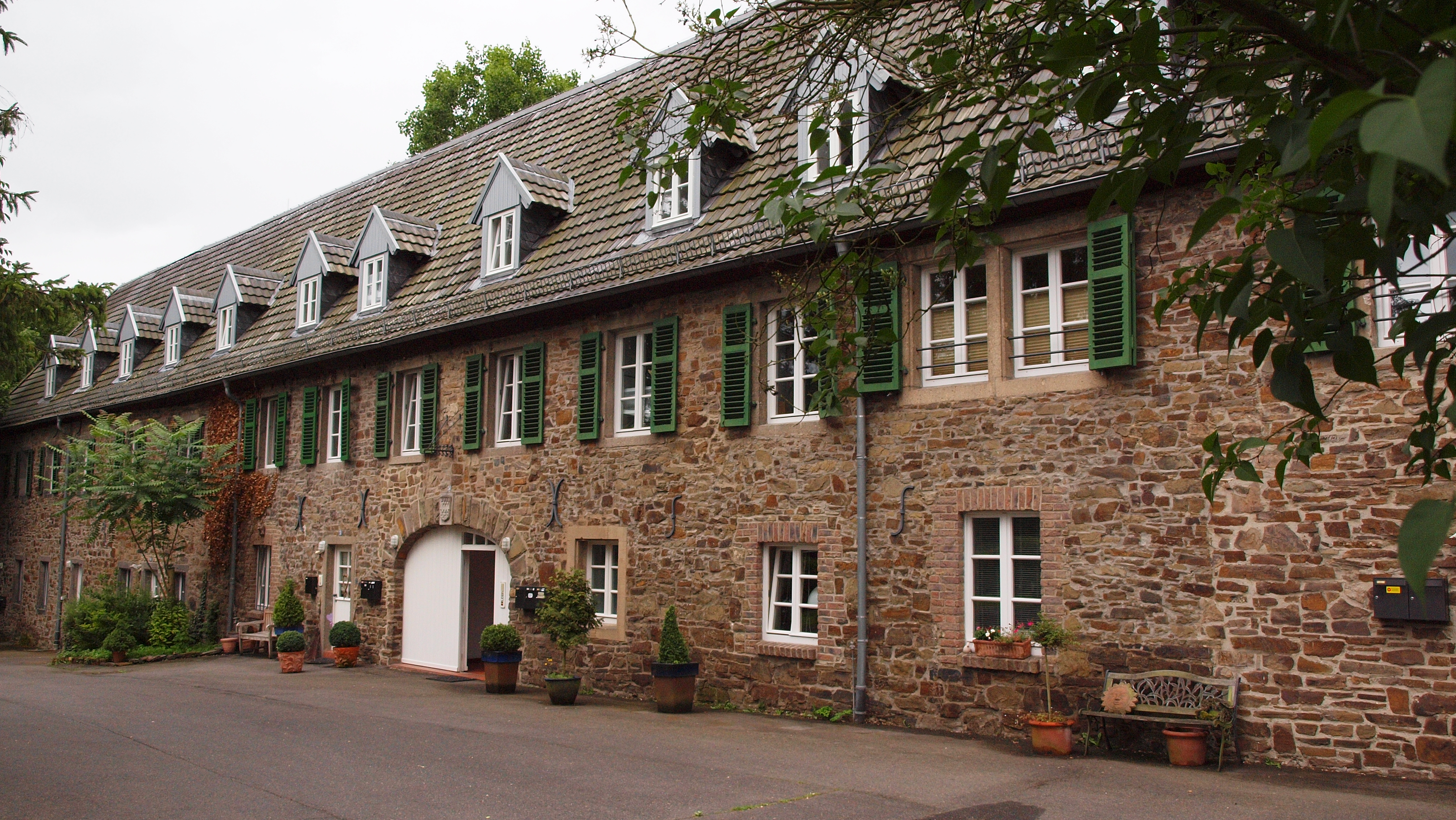
16th century outbuilding containing the stables.

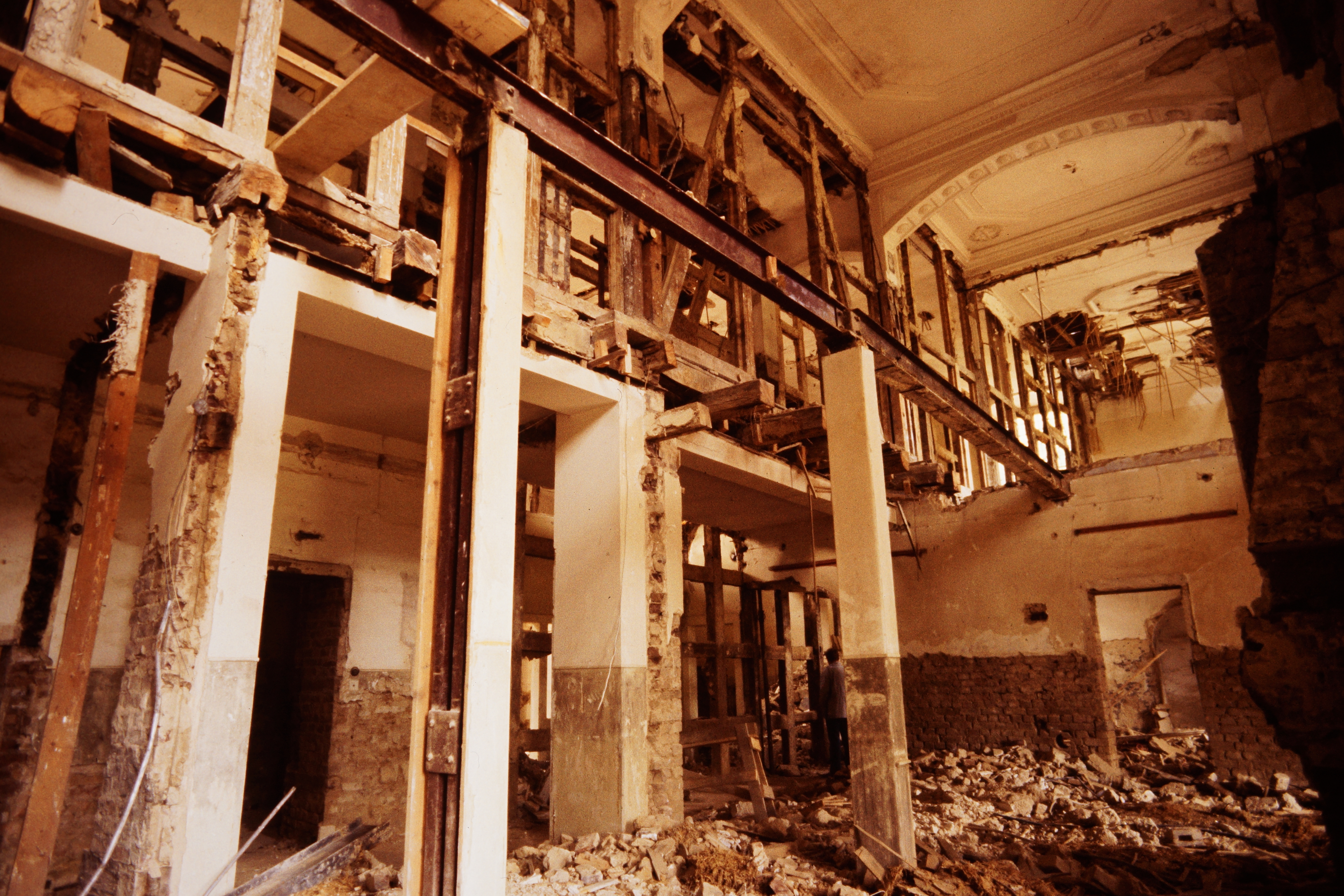
Interior of the manor during its conversion to condominiums in May 1986.
