= Rütsch =

Coordinates: 50.7436°N 7.3183°E

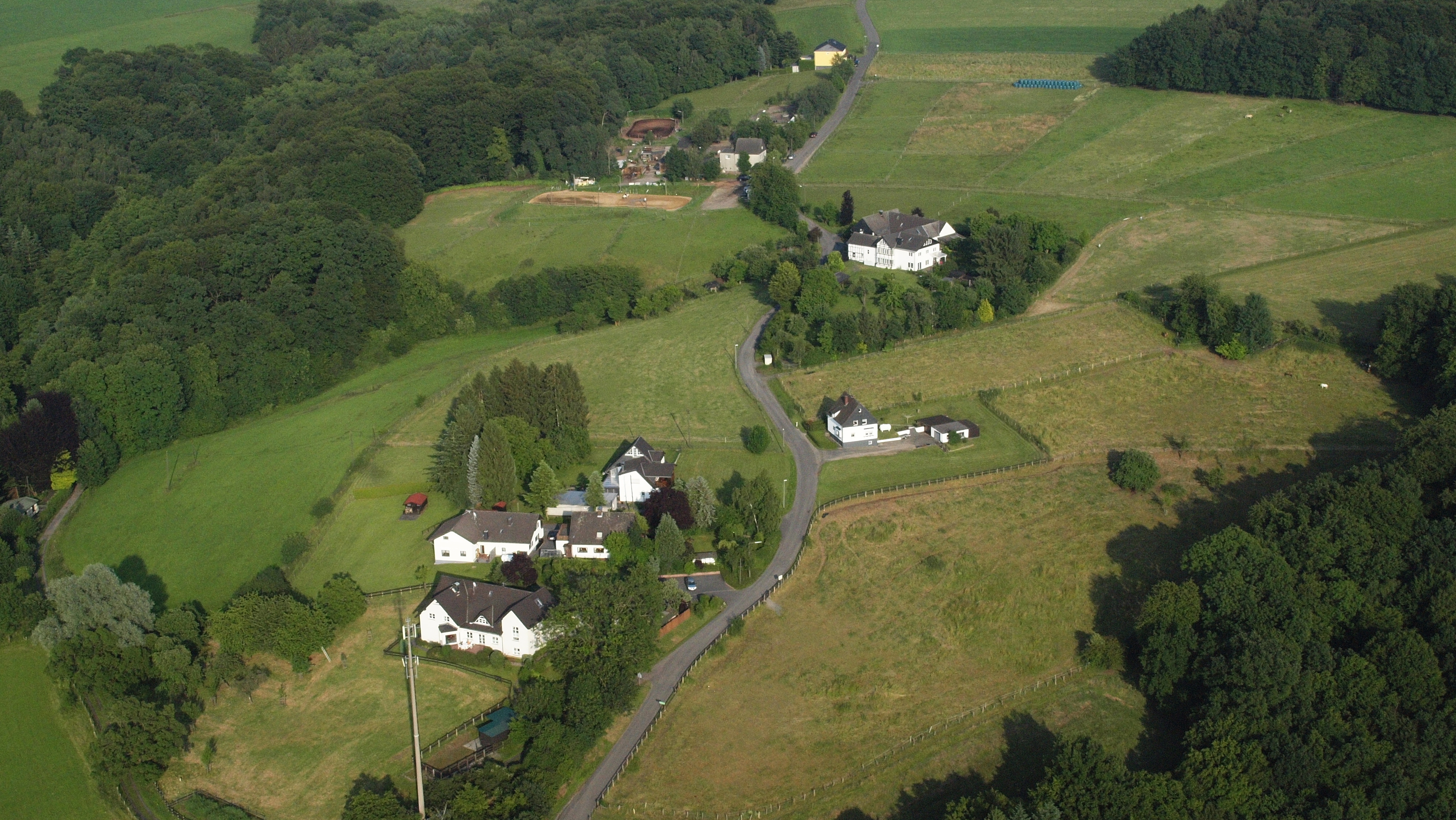

Rütsch is an Ortsteil (village) in the city of Hennef in the Rhein-Sieg district in North Rhine-Westphalia, Germany.

== Location ==
The village lies in an altitude ranging from 131 to 167 meters above sea level on the slopes of the Westerwald, but is nevertheless a part of the Natural Park Bergisches Land. Neighbouring villages are Kurenbach and Lichtenberg.

== History ==
In 1910 there were following households in Rutsch: farmer Maximilian Engels, factory worker Heinrich Meurer, mason Heinrich Stricker and mason Heinrich Wittkopp. In 2024 the village had 26 inhabitants.

Until 1 August 1969 the village Rütsch belonged to the Uckerath municipality. As a part of municipal reform of the Bonn area, Uckerath, and thus also the village Rütsch, were assigned to the then-new independent municipality Hennef (Sieg).
