= Hennef (Sieg) =

- Town
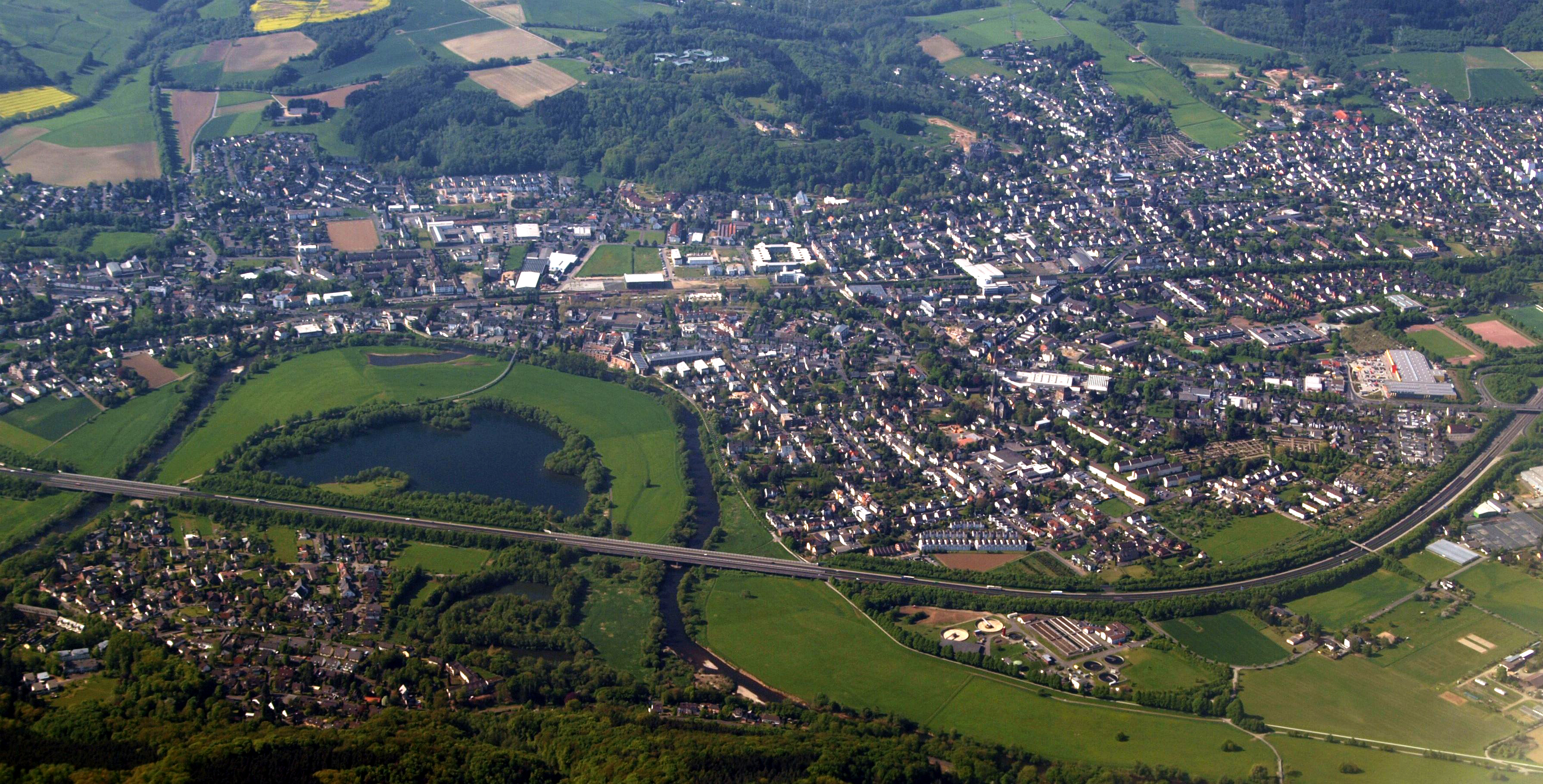
- Aerial view of Hennef, May 2008

- Coat of arms

- Location of Hennef within Rhein-Sieg-Kreis district
- Interactive map of Hennef
- Location within Germany Location within North Rhine-Westphalia
- Coordinates: 50°47′N 7°17′E
- Country: Germany
- State: North Rhine-Westphalia
- Admin. region: Köln
- District: Rhein-Sieg-Kreis

Government
  - Mayor (2020–25): Mario Dahm (SPD)

Area
  - Total: 105.89 km^{2} (40.88 sq mi)
- Elevation: 68 m (223 ft)

Population (2025-12-31)
  - Total: 48,112
  - Density: 454.36/km^{2} (1,176.8/sq mi)
- Time zone: UTC+01:00 (CET)
  - Summer (DST): UTC+02:00 (CEST)
- Postal codes: 53773
- Dialling codes: 02242/02248
- Vehicle registration: SU
- Website: www.hennef.de

Hennef (Sieg) (German pronunciation: [ˈhɛnɛf]) is a town in the Rhein-Sieg district of North Rhine-Westphalia, Germany. It is situated on the river Sieg, approx. 7 kilometres (4 miles) south-east of Siegburg and 15 km (9 mi) east of Bonn. Hennef is the fourth-biggest town in the Rhein-Sieg-Kreis (i.e. district). It is the site of the 15th-century castle, Schloss Allner, next to the Allner See. Within Hennef is the town of Stadt Blankenberg, with the castle of Blankenberg.

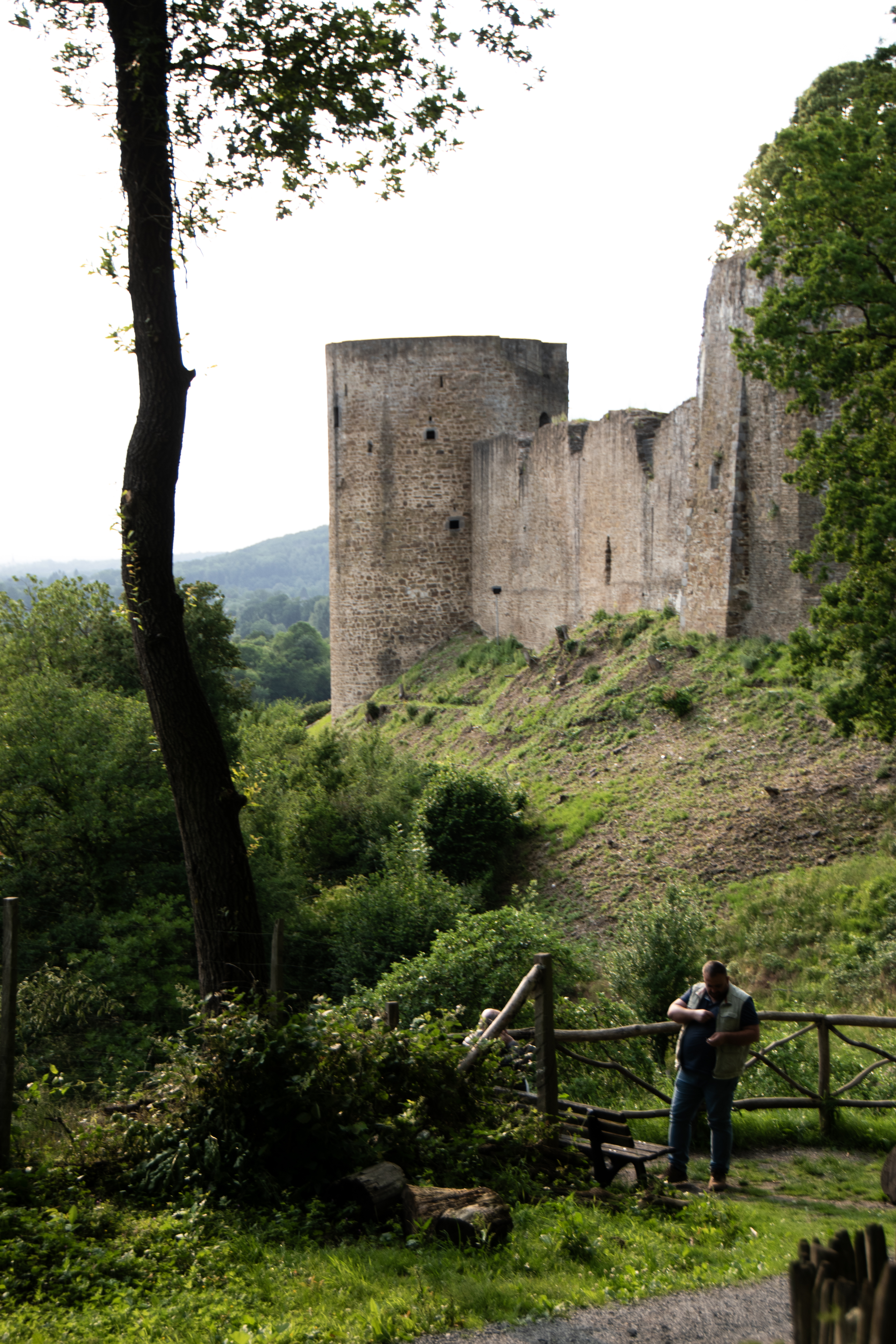
Blankenberg Castle, Blankenberg, Hennef

== Villages in Hennef ==
Hennef is known as the "City of 100 villages". The official list counts 89.

=== List of villages with number of inhabitants in 2024. ===
1. Adscheid: 209
2. Ahrenbach: 8
3. Allner: 1424
4. Altenbödingen: 433
5. Altglück: 1
6. Auel: 83
7. Beiert: 12
8. Berg: 61
9. Blankenbach: 38
10. Bödingen: 308
11. Bröl: 1332
12. Bülgenauel: 245
13. Büllesbach: 48
14. Büllesfeld: 11
15. Dahlhausen: 158
16. Dambroich: 671
17. Darscheid: 55
18. Depensiefen: 7
19. Derenbach: 10
20. Dondorf: 120
21. Dürresbach: 18
22. Eichholz: 166
23. Eulenberg: 457
24. Fernegierscheid: 95
25. Greuelsiefen: 448
26. Hahnenhardt: 19
27. Halberg: 4
28. Halmshanf: 14
29. Hanf: 242
30. Happerschoß: 1426
31. Haus Ölgarten: 9
32. Heckelsberg: 4
33. Heisterschoß: 1203
34. Hermesmühle: 25
35. Hofen: 36
36. Hommerich: 10
37. Hossenberg: 35
38. Hove: 27
39. Hüchel: 382
40. Hülscheid: 82
41. Issertshof: 20
42. Käsberg: 69
43. Kningelthal: 84
44. Knippgierscheid: 33
45. Köschbusch: 150
46. Kraheck: 76
47. Kümpel: 57
48. Kurenbach: 86
49. Kurscheid: 289
50. Lanzenbach: 426
51. Lauthausen: 558
52. Lescheid: 47
53. Lichtenberg: 1119
54. Liesberg: 2
55. Löbach: 24
56. Lückert: 95
57. Meisenbach: 73
58. Michelshohn: 27
59. Mittelscheid: 268
60. Niederhalberg: 63
61. Oberauel: 419
62. Oberhalberg: 41
63. Petershohn: 3
64. Raveneck: 8
65. Ravenstein: 35
66. Rott: 838
67. Röttgen: 42
68. Rütsch: 26
69. Schächer: 18
70. Scheuren: 13
71. Scheurenmühle: 25
72. Sommershof: 66
73. Söven: 968
74. Stadt Blankenberg: 614
75. Stein: 87
76. Stoßdorf: 1678
77. Striefen: 174
78. Süchterscheid: 464
79. Theishohn: 4
80. Uckerath: 3446
81. Wasserheß: 96
82. Weingartsgasse: 224
83. Weldergoven: 1045
84. Wellesberg: 171
85. Westerhausen: 506
86. Wiederschall: 5
87. Wiersberg: 48
88. Wippenhohn: 32
89. Zumhof: 34

== Population ==
Historical population

Year	Pop.	±% p.a.
1965	23,099	—
1970	26,053	+2.44%
1975	27,808	+1.31%
1980	29,228	+1.00%
1985	30,107	+0.59%
1990	32,521	+1.55%
1995	38,115	+3.23%

Year	Pop.	±% p.a.
2000	42,711	+2.30%
2005	45,493	+1.27%
2010	46,114	+0.27%
2015	46,902	+0.34%
2020	47,544	+0.27%
2025	48,112	+0.24%

Source: Landesdatabank Nordrhein-Westfalen

== Twin towns – sister cities ==
Hennef is twinned with:

- Banbury, England, United Kingdom (1981)
- Le Pecq, France (1997)
- Nowy Dwór Gdański, Poland (2001)
- Foley, Alabama, United States (2022)

== Transport links ==
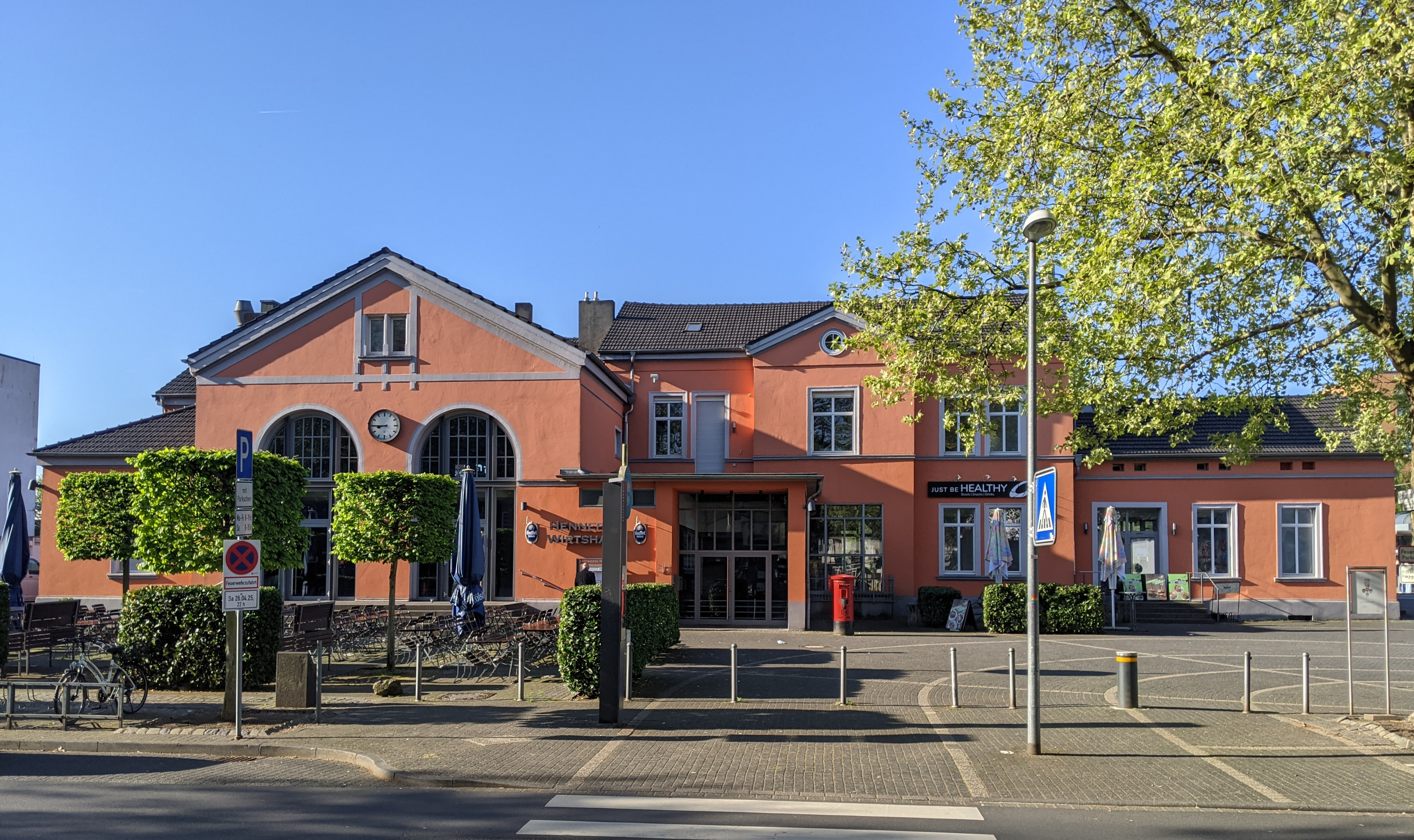
Henenf (Sieg) station, reception building

Henenf is served by the lines S12 and S19 of the Cologne S-Bahn and the local train RE9 (Rhein-Sieg-Express), it is located in the area of the fare association Rheinland-Tarif.

== Trivia ==
- The first calibratable automatic weighing scales in the world were invented by Carl Reuther in Hennef
- Hennef's current district of Geistingen was first mentioned in a document from 885. Hennef itself was first mentioned in 1075 as "Hannafo"
- The national football team sometimes trains at the Sportschule Hennef; at the FIFA Confederations Cup in 2005 the Argentina national football team stayed here.
- Football teams Tura Hennef and F.C. Geistingen amalgamated in 2005 to become Hennef '05
- The song What Is Love by Haddaway was written and produced in Hennef

== Notable people ==
- Annika Zeyen (born 1985), Paralympic champion (wheelchair basketball and Handbike)
- Joseph Dietzgen (1828–1888), philosopher
- Hank Levine (born 1965), movie director, producer
- Walter von Loë (1828–1908), Prussian field marshal
- Ranga Yogeshwar (born 1959), scientist
- Kim Petras (born 1992), pop singer and songwriter
