= Eugene Dietzgen =

American businessman

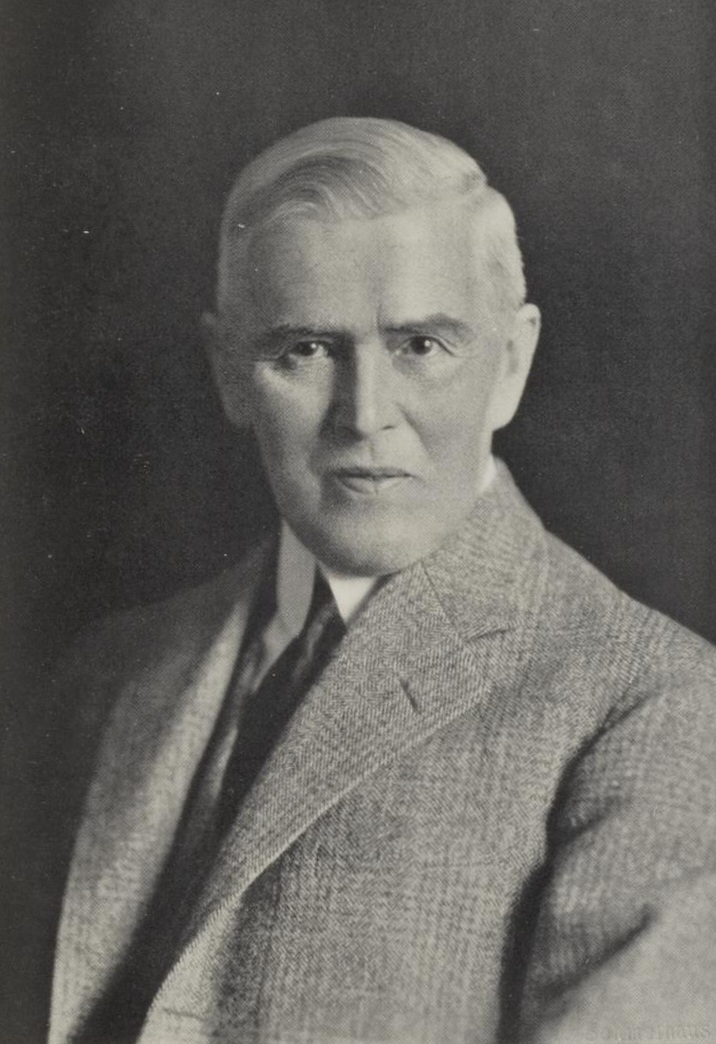
Eugene Dietzgen

Eugene Dietzgen (1862–1929) was a German-American manufacturer of engineering supplies. He was also a writer and promoter of the ideas of his father, the Marxist philosopher Joseph Dietzgen.

== Early life ==
Eugene Dietzgen, the eldest son of Joseph Ditzgen, was born in Uckerath, Prussia. At age two he was taken by his father to Tsarist Russia, where he was educated in the Russian language and in his father's trade, tannery. They both returned in 1868.

In 1881, Eugene's father sent him to America to escape the military draft and to hide some of his father's socialist literature; the literature had already landed Joseph in jail a few years before. Eugene was only 19 years old when he arrived in New York City. He began work with a German drafting company, and eventually moved to Chicago.

== Business life ==
In Chicago, Dietzgen started the Eugene Dietzgen Drafting Company, which operates today as Dietzgen Corporation, a privately held company.

Dietzgen, heavily influenced by his father, one of Karl Marx's favorite philosophers, provided his factory workers with many amenities not often found in the 19th century. These included separate bathrooms for men and women, open windowsills with flowers decorating the air, and a general atmosphere of a healthy working community. The original building still stands at 218 East 23rd Street, Chicago. By 1906, Dietzgen had two manufacturing plants. The company still exists, and its second building remains as a part of DePaul University, at the corner of Fullerton Avenue and Sheffield, in Chicago's once heavily German neighborhood of Lincoln Park.

The company was noted for its production of slide rules, which Dietzgen started in 1898 after acquiring a patent from John Givan Davis Mack (1867–1924). His company's Mack Improved Mannheim Simplex Slide Rule sold from 1902 to 1912 for $4.50.

== Editor and writer ==
Dietzgen actively promoted the work of his father, Joseph, and added additional philosophical material of his own.

== Personal life ==
Dietzgen's first wife was unable to conceive; they divorced, and in 1912 Eugene moved to Zurich, Switzerland. There he met his second wife, Jansen, and they had three boys and three girls.
