= Joseph Dietzgen =

German philosopher (1828–1888)

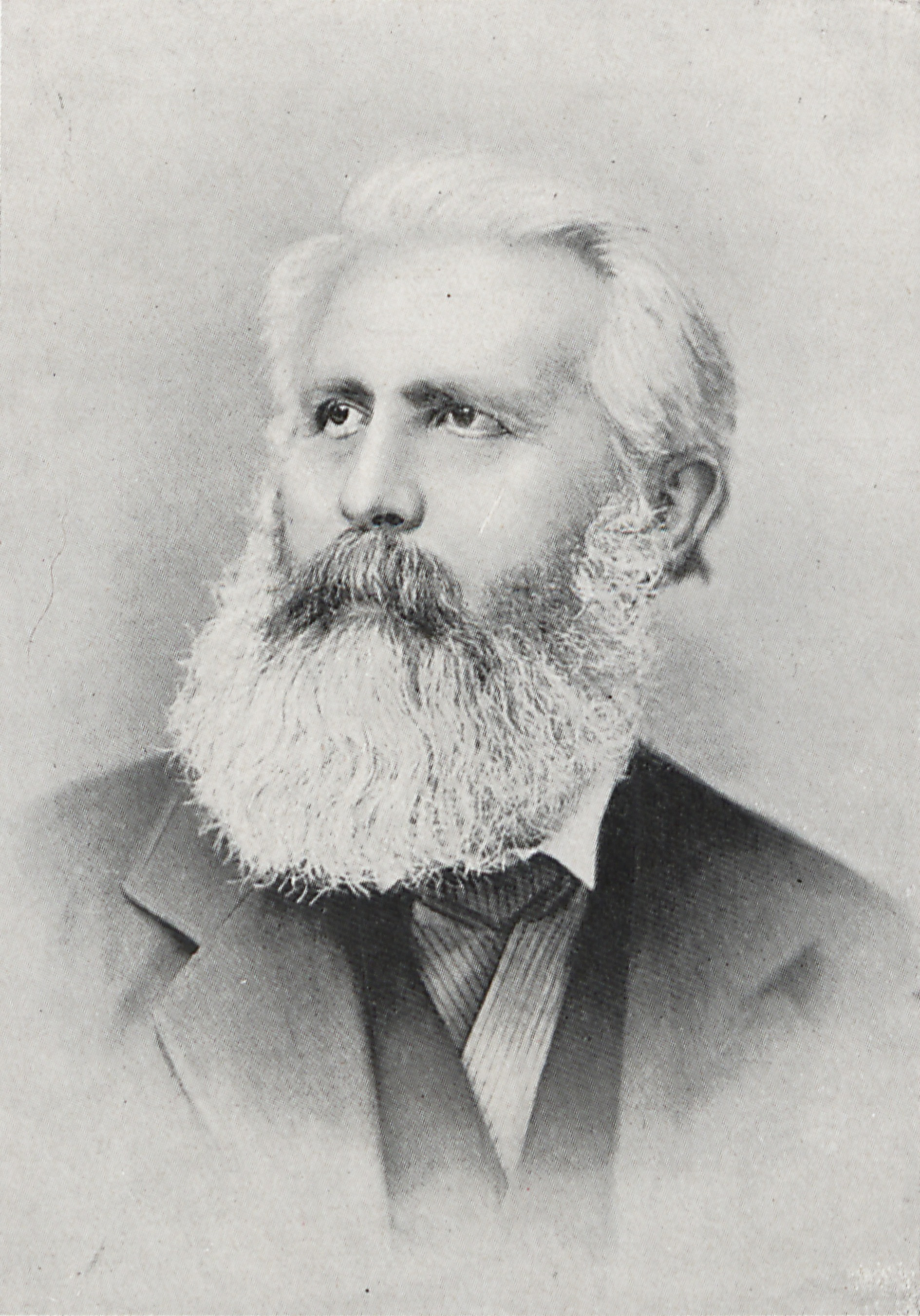
- Born: Peter Josef Dietzgen; December 9, 1828; Blankenberg, Rhine Province, Kingdom of Prussia, German Confederation
- Died: 15 April 15, 1888; Chicago, Illinois, U.S.

Philosophical work
- Era: 19th-century philosophy
- Region: Western philosophy
- School: Continental philosophy Marxism
- Main interests: Epistemology, logic, dialectics
- Notable ideas: Dialectical materialism

Peter Josef Dietzgen (German: [ˈdiːt͡sɡən]; December 9, 1828 – April 15, 1888) was a German socialist philosopher and journalist. He is credited with independently developing the philosophical theory of dialectical materialism that is associated with Karl Marx and Friedrich Engels.

== Life ==
Dietzgen was born in Blankenberg in the Rhine Province of Prussia. He was the oldest of five children of father Johann Gottfried Anno Dietzgen (1794–1887) and mother Anna Margaretha Lückerath (1808–1881). Entirely self-educated, Joseph was, like his father, a tanner by profession, eventually inheriting his uncle's business in Siegburg.

Early in his youth, Joseph Dietzgen worked with the famed Forty-Eighters of the 1848 German Revolution. It was there that he met Karl Marx and other socialist revolutionaries, and began his career as a socialist philosopher. Following the failure of the 1848 Revolution, he spent time in the United States from 1849 to 1851, returning again for a visit from 1859 to 1862. While in the New World, he traversed the American South and witnessed first hand the lynchings which had come to characterize the slave states. During the period between his travels, Dietzgen along with Marx joined the Alliance of Communists in Germany in 1852. In 1853, after marrying his wife Cordula Finke, Dietzgen established his tannery business in Winterscheid (today part of Ruppichteroth), Germany. He and his wife had one son, Eugene.

When Dietzgen returned to the U.S. in 1859, he set up another tannery in Montgomery, Alabama. From 1864 to 1868 he lived with Eugene in St. Petersburg, where Dietzgen was manager of the state tannery and worked with the Emperor of Russia on establishing new types of tanneries in Russia. During his time in Russia, Dietzgen wrote one of his earliest texts, The Nature of Human Brain-Work, which was published in 1869. Upon reading it, Marx forwarded a copy to Engels, remarking, "My opinion is that J. Dietzgen would do better to condense all his ideas into two printer's sheets and have them published under his own name as a tanner. If he publishes them in the size he is proposing, he will discredit himself with his lack of dialectical development and his way of going round in circles." While Dietzgen traveled, his wife managed the family tannery business in Germany until he returned in mid-1869. Once he was back home, he was visited by Marx and his daughter, who proclaimed that Dietzgen had become "the Philosopher" of socialism. By 1870, Marx had embraced Dietzgen as a friend, and later praised him and his theory of dialectical materialism in the 2nd edition of the first volume of Das Kapital.

On June 8, 1878, Dietzgen was arrested following the publication of a lecture he gave in Cologne, "The Future of the Social-Democracy". He spent two months in prison on remand before his trial was held. Although he was released along with copies of his article, he was re-arrested twice more before being freed. In 1881 Joseph sent Eugene to the U.S. to avoid the Kaiser's upcoming army draft, to safeguard his own articles and documents, and to secure a family home in America. Eugene was 19 when he arrived in New York, but he quickly launched a thriving family business in Chicago, the Eugene Dietzgen Drafting Company. During this period, Joseph and his son kept in close contact through correspondence, much of which has been preserved. In 1884, Dietzgen moved to the U.S. for the third and last time, initially to New York to become editor of Der Sozialist, a job he held until 1886. He was then hired to edit the Chicago-based anarchist newspaper Chicagoer Arbeiter-Zeitung after its previous editors were hanged in reaction to the Haymarket bombings.

Joseph Dietzgen's life and work have for some underscored the unity that existed on the political left at the time of the First International, before Anarchists and Marxists were later divided. He wrote in an 1886 letter: "For my part, I lay little stress on the distinction, whether a man is an anarchist or a socialist, because it seems to me that too much weight is attributed to this difference." This suggests he took a more conciliatory view of the disputes of the moment (see Anarchism and Marxism).

== Philosophy ==
Dietzgen's most significant contribution to philosophy is generally considered to be his work on dialectical materialism. He drew from Georg Wilhelm Friedrich Hegel's concept of the dialectic, and from the 19th-century materialism of Ludwig Feuerbach (a former Young Hegelian). Similar theoretical views were being developed independently by Marx and Engels. In his "Thirteenth Letter on Logic", Dietzgen summarized his philosophical positions:

The red thread winding through all these letters deals with the following points: The instrument of thought is a thing like all other common things, a part or attribute of the universe. It belongs particularly to the general category of being and is an apparatus which produces a detailed picture of human experience by categorical classification or distinction. In order to use this apparatus correctly, one must fully grasp the fact that the world unit is multiform and that all multiformity is a unit. It is the solution of the riddle of the ancient Eleatic philosophy: How can the one be contained in the many, and the many in one?

His explicit evocation of the Eleatics (Parmenides, Zeno of Elea, and Melissus of Samos) illustrated a distinctive quality in Dietzgen's writing, and set his language apart from the "mainstream" of dialectical materialism as it was more commonly articulated.

In 1906, Eugene wrote a preface to a Russian translation of Joseph Dietzgen's major works, in which Eugene characterized his father's philosophical teachings as an important supplement to Marxism:

If the founders of historical materialism, and their followers, in a whole series of convincing historical investigations, proved the connection between economic and spiritual development, and the dependence of the latter, in the final analysis, on economic relations, nevertheless they did not prove that this dependence of the spirit is rooted in its nature and in the nature of the universe. Marx and Engels thought that they had ousted the last spectres of idealism from the understanding of history. This was a mistake, for the metaphysical spectres found a niche for themselves in the unexplained essence of the human spirit and in the universal whole which is closely associated with the latter. Only a scientifically verified criticism of cognition could eject idealism from here.

This prompted a negative reaction from Georgi Plekhanov, one of the earliest Russian Marxists (as well as co-founder of the Iskra magazine and Russian Social-Democratic Labor Party), in an article published in 1907:

Despite all our respect for the noble memory of the German worker-philosopher, and despite our personal sympathy for his son, we find ourselves compelled to protest resolutely against the main idea of the preface from which we have just quoted. In it, the relationship of Joseph Dietzgen to Marx and Engels is quite wrongly stated".

In Materialism and Empirio-criticism: Critical Comments on a Reactionary Philosophy (1909), Lenin's philosophical polemic against Ernst Mach (and more pertinently, his rival Alexander Bogdanov), Lenin quoted extensively from Dietzgen. Elsewhere Lenin made notes concerning Dietzgen among the works later grouped into Lenin's Philosophical Notebooks (Collected Works, Vol. 38., Lawrence & Wishart, 1980). In the note on pages 403-406, Lenin compared Dietzgen unfavourably to Feuerbach:

...To be does not mean to exist in thought. In this respect Feuerbach's philosophy is far clearer than the philosophy of Dietzgen. "The proof that something exists," Feuerbach remarks, "has no other meaning than that something exists not in thought alone."

== Death ==
On April 15, 1888, Dietzgen died at home in Chicago while smoking a cigar. He had taken a stroll in Lincoln Park, and was having a political discussion in a "vivacious and excited" manner about the "imminent collapse of capitalist production". He stopped in mid-sentence with his hand in the air – dead of paralysis of the heart. He is buried at the Waldheim Cemetery (now Forest Home Cemetery), in Forest Park, Illinois, near the graves of those executed after the Haymarket Affair (popularly known as the Haymarket Martyrs).

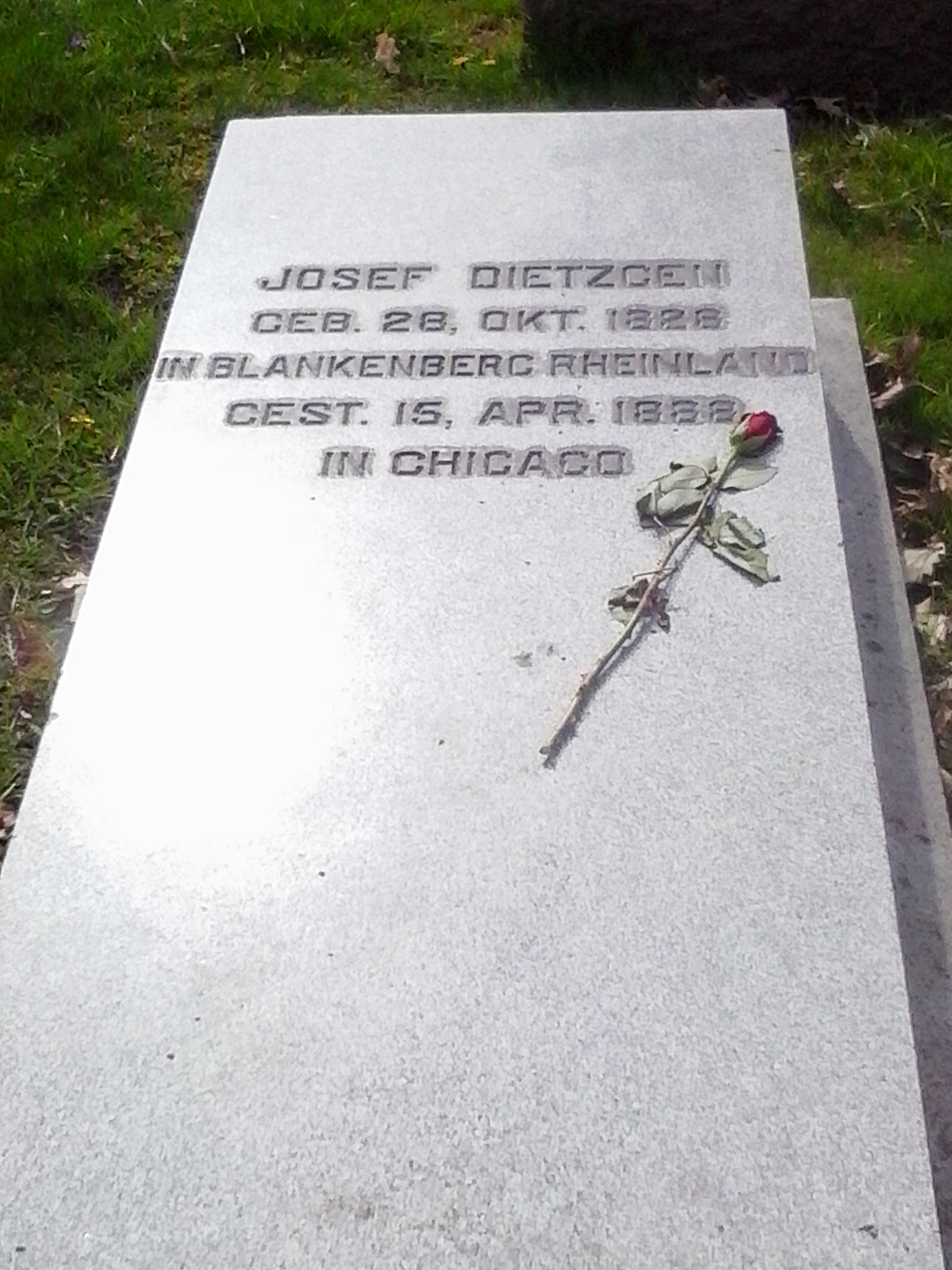
Grave of Josef Dietzgen, Forest Home (formerly Waldheim) Cemetery, Forest Park, Illinois

== Legacy ==
Anton Pannekoek, the Dutch astronomer and council communist (belonging to a position which Lenin decried in "Left-Wing" Communism: An Infantile Disorder) noted that, in Materialism and Empirio-criticism, Lenin cited Dietzgen's early 1880s work, "Letters on Logic", but not the final one to be composed, The Positive Outcome of Philosophy (1887).

In his 1938 book Lenin as Philosopher (written after Materialism and Empirio-criticism had been given the status of a paradigm of philosophy in the USSR), Pannekoek included a highly critical response to the text. Pannekoek charged that Lenin had ignored Dietzgen's last philosophical work and therefore misunderstood the development of Dietzgen's thought.

In his polemic against Lenin, Pannekoek appeals to Dietzgen as an authority on Marxist philosophy. Dietzgen's writings are most discussed and attract the most interest in the context of these debates, but have otherwise fallen into obscurity in present-day philosophy.

Dietzgen figured on a commemorative postage stamp issued in the German Democratic Republic.

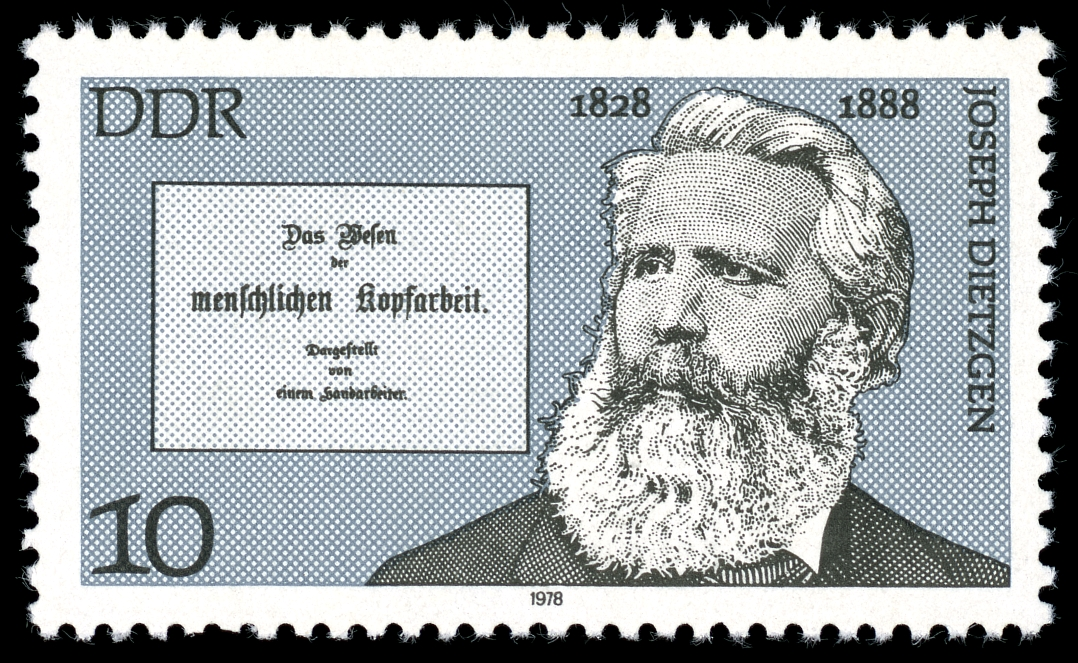
Dietzgen on an East German commemorative stamp

== Major works ==
- The Nature of Human Brainwork (1869)
- "The Religion of Social Democracy" Six sermons from 1870 to 1875
- "Scientific Socialism" (1873)
- "The Ethics of Social Democracy" (1875)
- "Social Democratic Philosophy" (1876)
- "The Inconceivable: a Special Chapter in Social-Democratic Philosophy" (1877)
- "The Limits of Cognition" (1877)
- "Our Professors on the Limits of Cognition" (1878)
- "Letters on Logic" (addressed to Eugene Dietzgen) (1880–1884)
- "Excursions of a Socialist into the Domain of Epistemology" (1886)
- The Positive Outcome of Philosophy (1887)

More recent editions:

- Nature of Human Brain Work: An Introduction to Dialectics, Left Bank Books, Reprint 1984, ISBN 0317185586
- Philosophical Essays on Socialism and Science, Religion, Ethics; Critique-Of-Reason and the World-At-Large, Kessinger Publications, 2004, ISBN 1432615130
- The Positive Outcome of Philosophy; The Nature of Human Brain Work; Letters on Logic, Kessinger Publications, 2007, ISBN 054822210X

== Collected writings ==
- Josef Dietzgen, Sämtliche Schriften, hrsg. von Eugen Dietzgen, 4. Auflage, Berlin, 1930
- Joseph Dietzgen, Schriften in drei Bänden, hrsg. von der Arbeitsgruppe für Philosophie an der Akademie der Wissenschaften der DDR zu Berlin, Berlin, 1961–1965
