= Wahnbach =

River in Germany

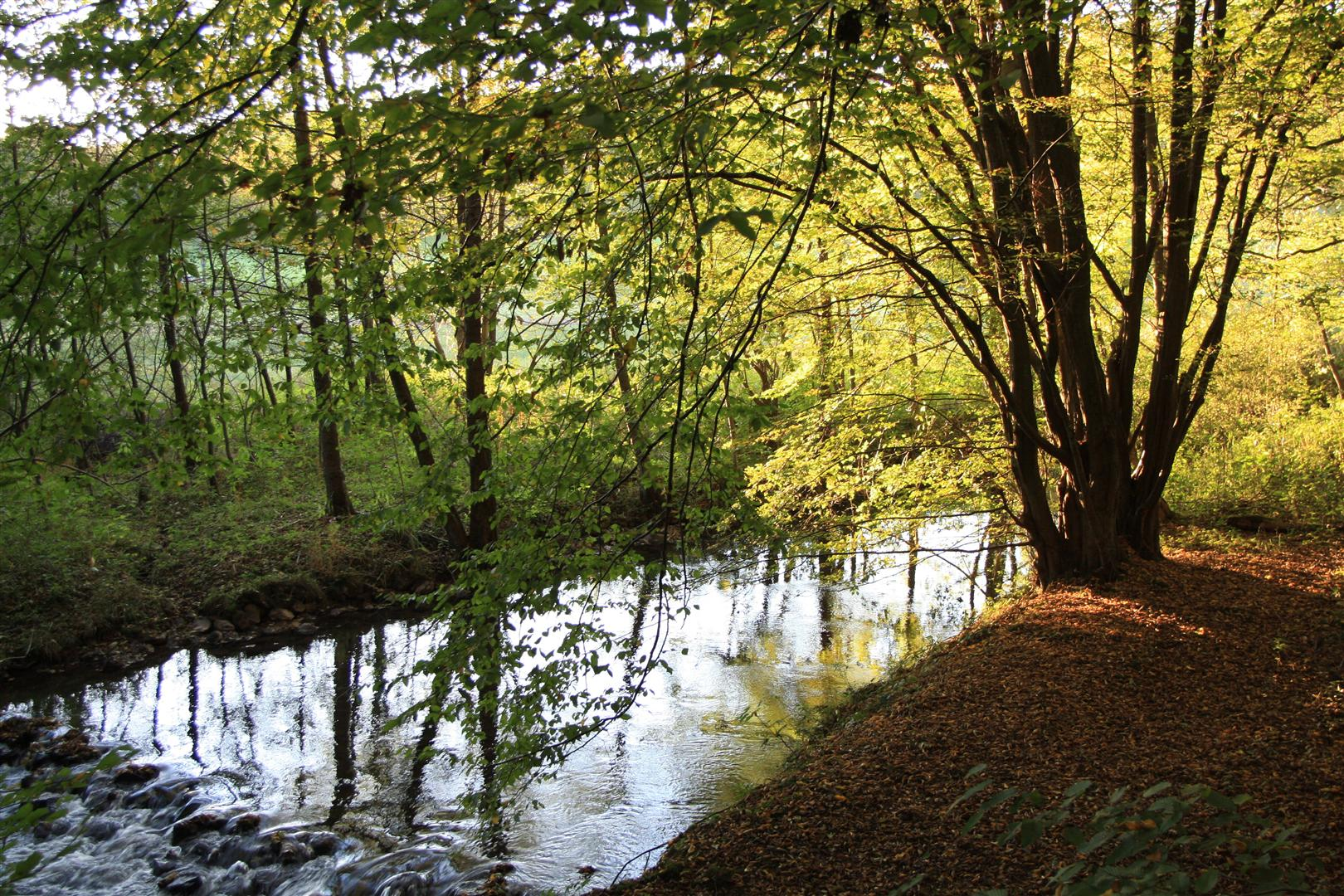

Location
- Country: Germany
- State: North Rhine-Westphalia

Physical characteristics
- Mouth
  - location: Sieg
  - coordinates: 50.7939°N 7.2717°E
- Length: 29.4 km (18.3 mi)

Basin features
- Progression: Sieg→ Rhine→ North Sea

Wahnbach is a river of North Rhine-Westphalia, Germany. It flows into the Sieg near Hennef.

== See also ==
- List of rivers of North Rhine-Westphalia
