= Endenicher Bach =

River in Germany

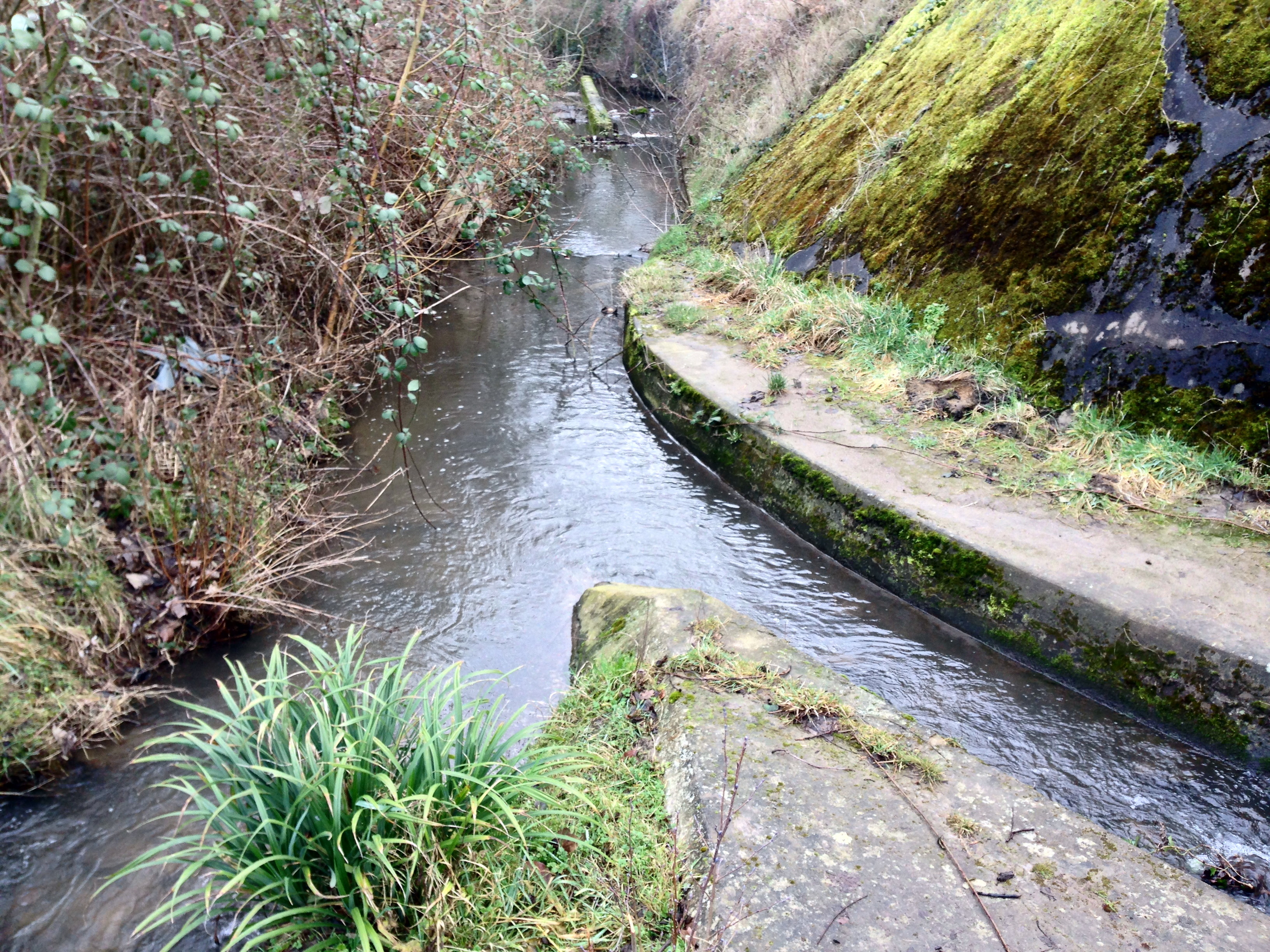
- Flow from Endenicher Bach into Dransdorfer Bach

Location
- Country: Germany
- Location: Bonn, North Rhine-Westphalia
- Reference no.: DE: 271982

Physical characteristics
- Source
  - location: South of Röttgen (near the Jakobskreuz)
  - coordinates: 50°40′03″N 7°04′09″E
  - elevation: ca. 175 m above sea level (NHN)
- Mouth
  - location: In Endenich into the cities underground watersystem.
  - coordinates: 50°43′34″N 7°04′27″E
  - elevation: ca. 65 m above sea level (NHN)
- Length: 11.565 km
- Basin size: 28.298 km²

Basin features
- Progression: Dransdorfer Bach→ Rhine→ North Sea
- Landmarks: Cities: Bonn
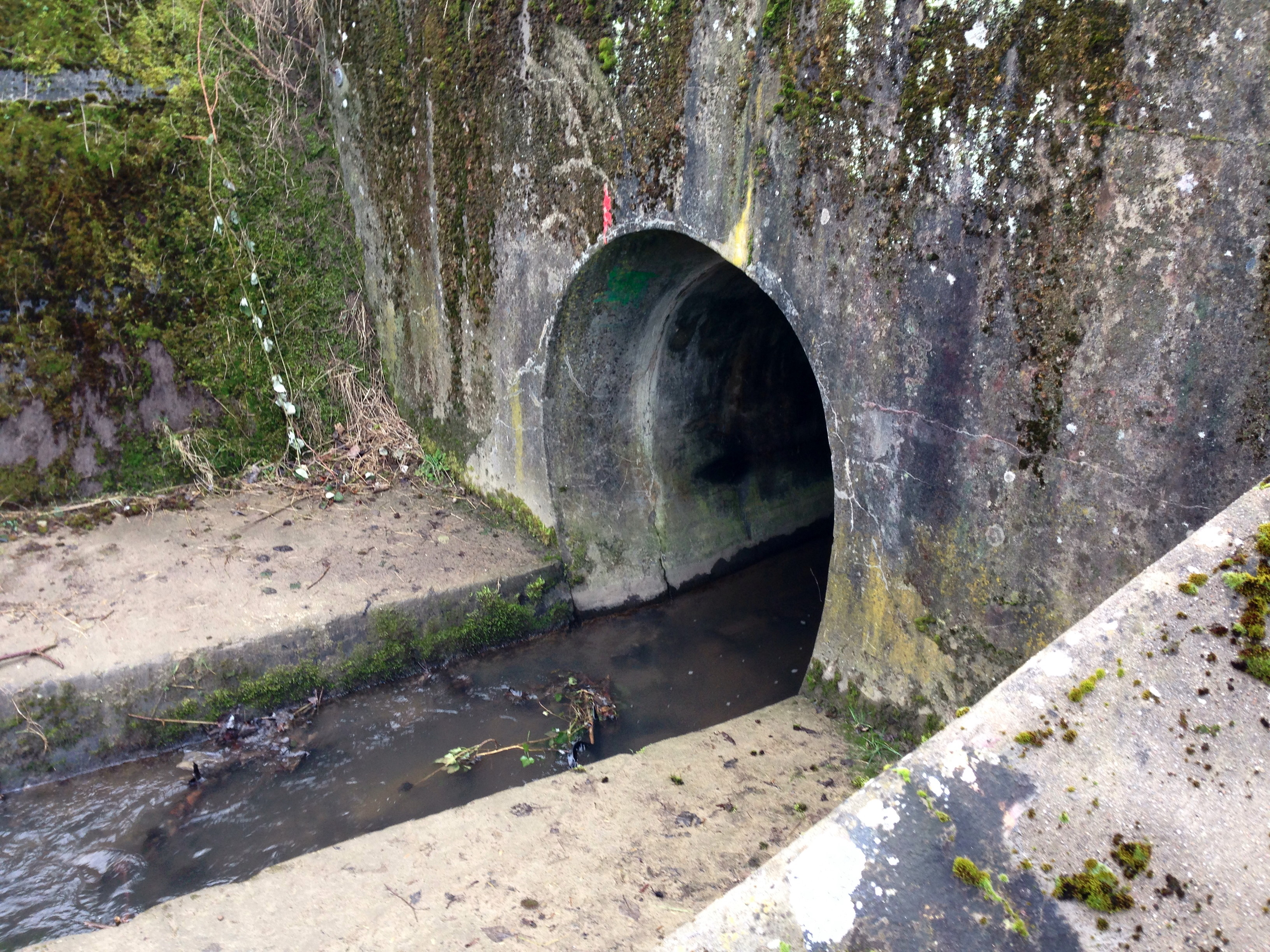
- The underground part at Siemens Street

Endenicher Bach ("stream of Endenich") is a river of North Rhine-Westphalia, Germany.

The Endenicher Bach is called Katzenlochbach at its origin but goes through some name changes on its way to a confluence with the Hardtbach (commonly known as the Dransdorfer Bach), which later flows into the river Rhine. It first changes into Endenicher Bach and later into Lengsdorfer Bach. With a length of 11 kilometres (6.8 mi), it's the longest stream in Bonn.

== See also ==
- List of rivers of North Rhine-Westphalia
