= Hardtbach (Rhine) =

River in Germany

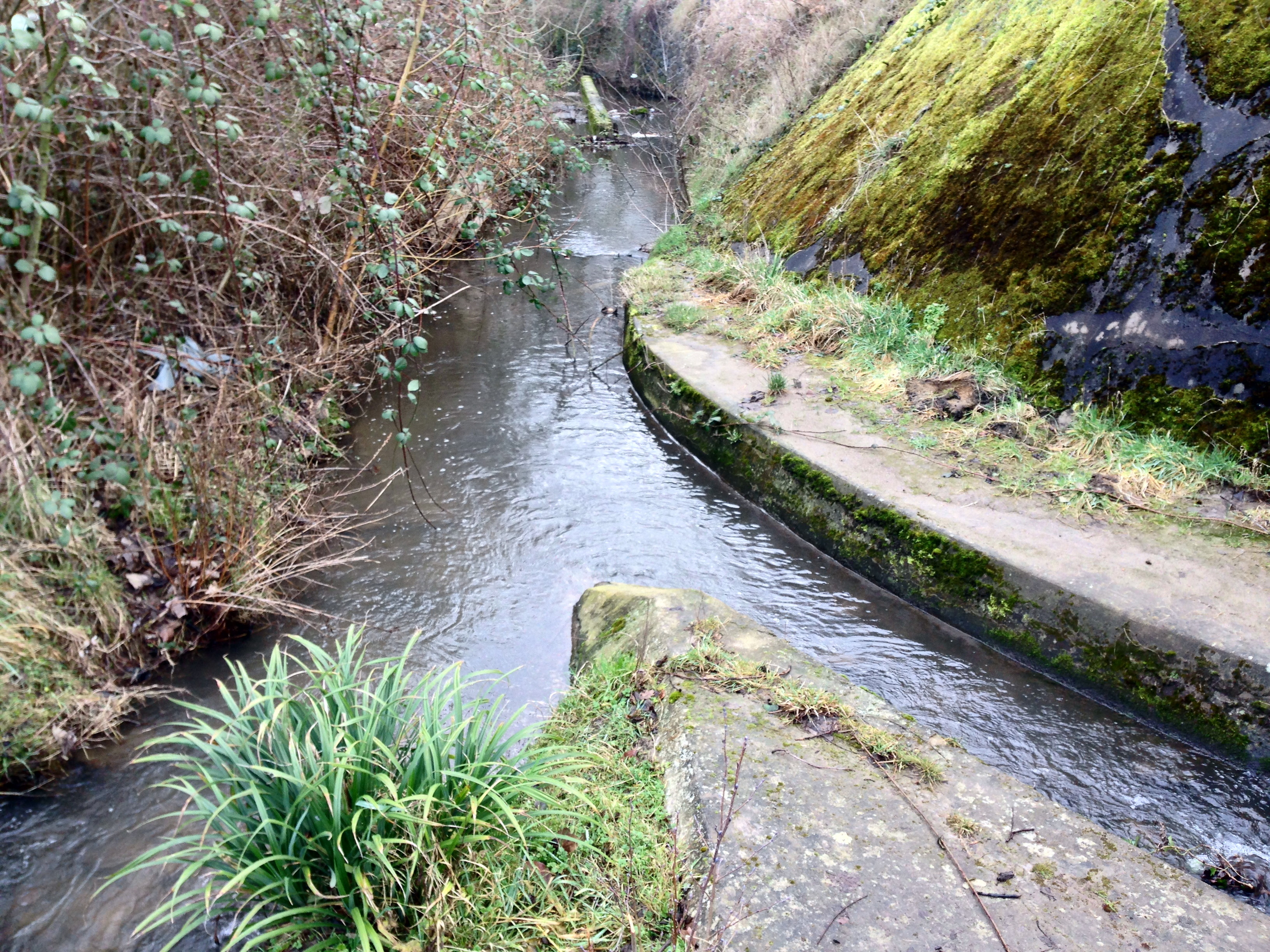

Location
- Country: Germany
- State: North Rhine-Westphalia

Physical characteristics
- Mouth: Rhine
  - coordinates: 50.7625°N 7.0823°E
- Length: 15.0 km (9.3 mi)

Basin features
- Progression: Rhine→ North Sea

Hardtbach (also: Rheindorfer Bach, Dransdorfer Bach, Alte Bach) is a river of North Rhine-Westphalia, Germany. It is a left tributary of the Rhine near Bonn.

== See also ==
- List of rivers of North Rhine-Westphalia
