= Drolshagen =

- Town
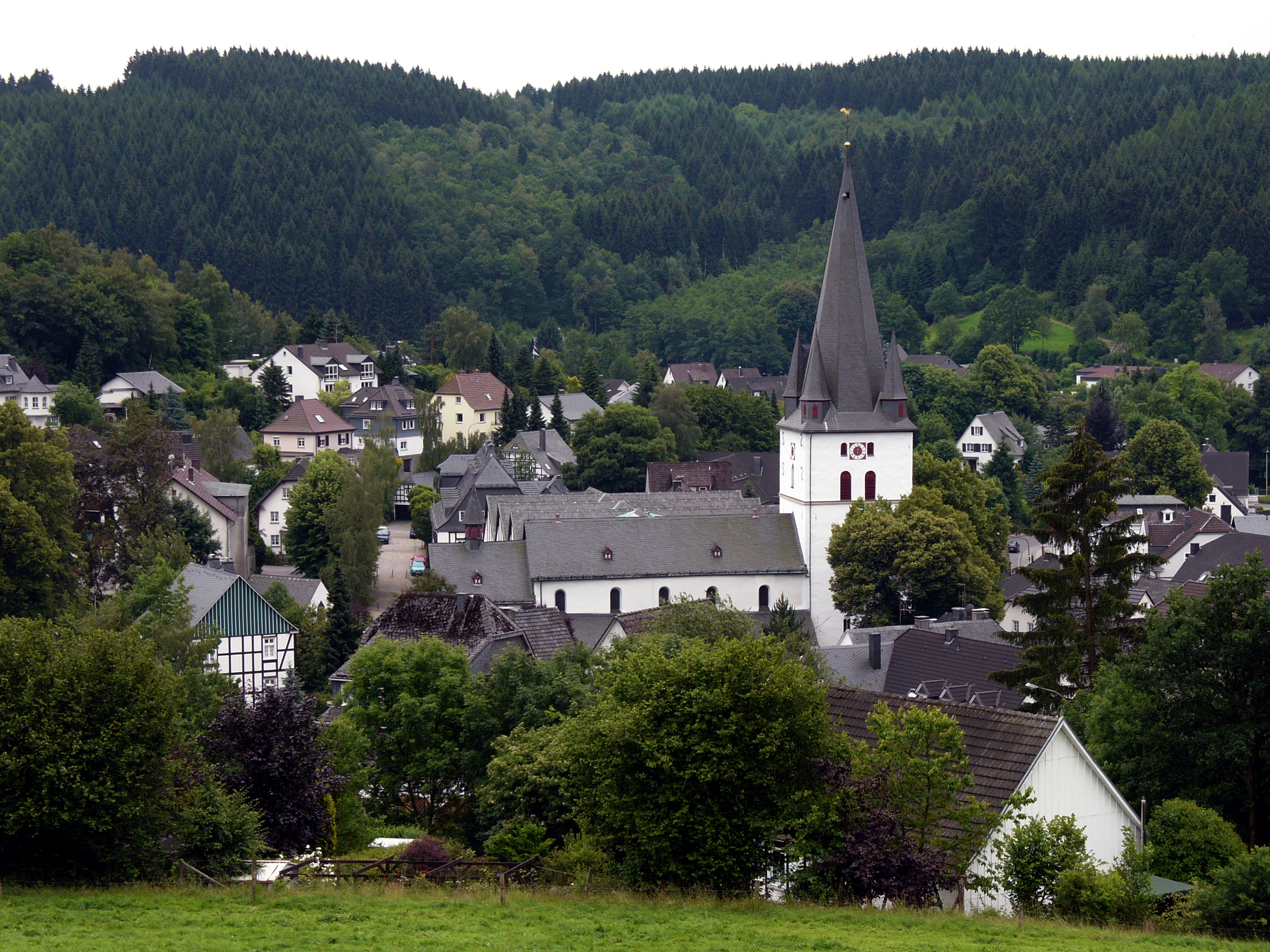
- View of Drolshagen towards south from Papenberg (417 m). St. Clement's Church dominates the skyline.

- Coat of arms

- Location of Drolshagen within Olpe district
- Interactive map of Drolshagen
- Location within Germany Location within North Rhine-Westphalia
- Coordinates: 51°02′N 07°46′E
- Country: Germany
- State: North Rhine-Westphalia
- Admin. region: Arnsberg
- District: Olpe
- Subdivisions: 58

Government
  - Mayor (2020–25): Ulrich Berghof (CDU)

Area
  - Total: 67.11 km^{2} (25.91 sq mi)
- Elevation: 353 m (1,158 ft)

Population (2025-12-31)
  - Total: 11,858
  - Density: 176.7/km^{2} (457.6/sq mi)
- Time zone: UTC+01:00 (CET)
  - Summer (DST): UTC+02:00 (CEST)
- Postal codes: 57489
- Dialling codes: 02761, 02763
- Vehicle registration: OE
- Website: www.drolshagen.de

Drolshagen (German pronunciation: [ˈdʁɔlshaɡn̩]; Westphalian: Draulsen, or Draulzen) is a town belonging to the district of Olpe in the Regierungsbezirk of Arnsberg in North Rhine-Westphalia, Germany, lying roughly 5 km west of Olpe.

== Geography ==
=== Location ===
Drolshagen lies in the heavily wooded Naturpark Ebbegebirge in the Sauerland. The area of the municipality of Drolshagen is characterized by heavily wooded low mountain ranges with altitudes close to 500 metres, flat tops and broad valleys in between. More than 40% of the municipal area is wooded. To the west where the municipal area ends is a steep drop of altitude and the view is open towards the plains of the river Rhine in the distance.

=== Neighbouring municipalities ===
Drolshagen borders on the following towns and municipalities, clockwise beginning in the northwest:
Gummersbach, Meinerzhagen, Attendorn, Olpe, Wenden, Reichshof and Bergneustadt.

=== Constituent municipalities ===
Drolshagen's current municipal area comprises 58 municipalities of various sizes.

- More than 1,000 inhabitants are found in the following places:
  - Drolshagen (main town; 4,807), Hützemert (1,092)
- Between 500 and 1,000 inhabitants live in these places:
  - Iseringhausen, Schreibershof
- Between 250 and 500 inhabitants live in these places:
  - Benolpe, Berlinghausen, Bleche, Dumicke, Frenkhausen, Germinghausen, Herpel, Wegeringhausen
- Each of these places has fewer than 250 inhabitants:
  - Alperscheid, Beul, Brachtpe, Buchhagen, Bühren, Dirkingen, Eichen, Eichenermühle, Eltge, Essinghausen, Fahrenschotten, Feldmannshof, Gelslingen, Gipperich, Grünenthal, Halbhusten, Heiderhof, Heimicke, Hespecke, Husten, Junkernhöh, Kalberschnacke, Kram, Lüdespert, Neuenhaus, Öhringhausen, Scheda, Schlade, Schlenke, Schürholz, Sendschotten, Siebringhausen, Stupperhof, Wenkhausen, Wintersohl

=== Streams and Hills ===
The highest hills are:

- Mark (512 m)
- Löh (482 m)
- Steupingen (481 m)

Several named and a number of unnamed streams and brooks flow through the valleys of the municipality of Drolshagen:

- Brachtpe
  - Rose
  - Steupinger Bach
- Herpel

The Brachtpe empties into the Biggesee and the Herpel into the Listertalsperre.

=== Geology ===
Like other areas of Sauerland Drolshagen is part of the Rheinisches Schiefergebirge.

== History ==
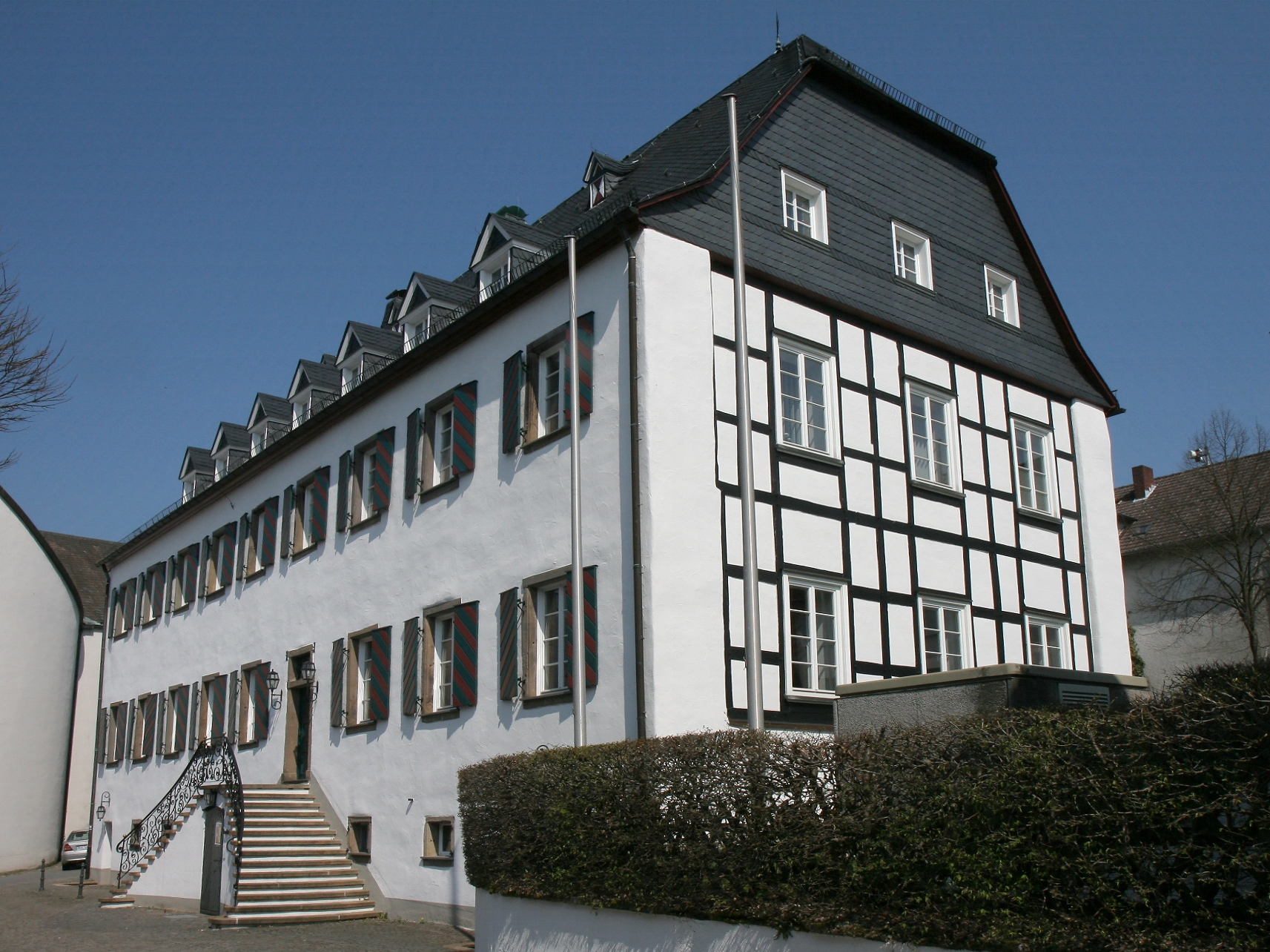
Monastery

The Sauerland, then known as Süderland, had been part of the Duchy of Saxony when it was given to the Archbishop of Cologne, Philipp, in 1180. In 1413, the townsfolk and Denklingen Castle were under the control of the Duke of Berg as part of the feudal system existing at the time. From 1470, the historical record mentions knights in Drolshagen.

Drolshagen was granted town rights on 2 March 1477 by Ruprecht, Archbishop of Cologne, thus entitling it to a market and walls. In 1485, these were not only confirmed but also strengthened by Archbishop Hermann IV, who added the right to hold a fair. Long before Droshagen received its town charter it had already been a Freiheit ("freedom") meaning that it had already been granted privileges close to a town charter. As such, Drolshagen had a mayor, a council and a seal of its own. Even by 1477, this "freedom's" sphere of influence within the Sauerland was already quite broad. The Cistercian monastery, endowed in 1235, fell into a quarrel with the town beginning in 1550 over who had rights to the St.-Clemens-Kirche (church), which in turn led to a trial in Rome.

In 1604, according to the Chronica Drolshagensis, Drolshagen was a member of the Hanse and traded with other Hanseatic cities, especially in Eastern Europe. In 1838, Drolshagen was almost utterly destroyed by fire. When the town was built anew, it had its streets laid out in a grid pattern. During World War II the town was spared bombing and thus still has many of its old buildings. In the course of municipal restructuring in North Rhine-Westphalia, the old Ämter of Drolshagen-Stadt (town) and Drolshagen-Land (country) were merged into the new town of Drolshagen in 1969.

As to the name's development, there are several theories, the likeliest of which appears in the Chronica Drolshagensis, according to which a knight named Drogilo established a Hag (a place ringed by hedgerows) on what is now the town's site, which he named Drogileshagino. Over time, this would have been corrupted to the name used today: Drolshagen

Witnesses to Drolshagen's past are St. Clement's Church whose middle section dates back to a Cistercian monastery established by the Counts of Sayn. Today only parts of buildings of the former monastery remain.

== Politics ==
=== Town council ===
The composition of the town council of Drolshagen since the September 2020 local elections:

- CDU 14 seats
- SPD 4 seats
- Unabhängige Drolshagener Wählergemeinschaft (UDW) 4 seats
- Unabhängige Christliche Wählergemeinschaft (UCW) 4 seats

=== Mayor ===
- 1994–2015: Theo Hilchenbach (CDU)
- 2015–incumbent: Ulrich Berghof (CDU)

=== Coat of arms ===
Drolshagen's arms show in the upper left and lower right three blue diamonds on a gold background, the arms formerly borne by the old Amt of Drolshagen-Land and indeed by the Lords of Drolshagen, a noble family. In the upper right and lower left are the arms formerly borne by the town before its amalgamation with the outlying rural Amt, namely Saint Clement's anchor, which is a reference to Saint Clement's Church (St.-Clemens-Kirche) in the town. The arms are quartered by the cross of the Electorate of Cologne, as Drolshagen belonged to the part of the Sauerland over which the Electorate held sway.

=== Town partnerships ===
Joure/De Fryske Marren, Netherlands, since October 1967

Helmsdorf, Thuringia, Germany ("friendship")

== Demographics ==
=== Religion ===
- Roman Catholic – 74.26%
- Protestant – 13.16%
- Other – 12.57%

=== Historical populations ===
Historical population

| Year | Pop. | ±% p.a. |
|---|---|---|
| 1895 | 2,900 | — |
| 1900 | 2,966 | +0.45% |
| 1939 | 6,295 | +1.95% |
| 1961 | 8,250 | +1.24% |
| 1965 | 8,963 | +2.09% |
| 1970 | 9,283 | +0.70% |
| 1975 | 9,413 | +0.28% |
| 1980 | 9,632 | +0.46% |
| 1985 | 10,064 | +0.88% |

| Year | Pop. | ±% p.a. |
|---|---|---|
| 1990 | 11,095 | +1.97% |
| 1995 | 12,039 | +1.65% |
| 2000 | 12,269 | +0.38% |
| 2005 | 12,377 | +0.18% |
| 2010 | 12,041 | −0.55% |
| 2015 | 11,874 | −0.28% |
| 2020 | 11,640 | −0.40% |
| 2025 | 11,858 | +0.37% |

Source: Landesdatabank Nordrhein-Westfalen (1965-2025)

== Culture and sightseeing ==
=== Buildings ===
- St.-Clemens-Pfarrkirche:

This Romanesque Catholic church's tower has its roots in the year 1491, and it houses a set of seven bells arranged g°-a°-c'-d'-e'-g'-a'. The great Christ-König-Glocke ("Christ King Bell") is the biggest cast steel bell in the Archbishopric of Paderborn. The other bells, which are artistically decorated, were cast in bronze in 1993. All together, the bells weigh roughly 18 000 kg and are counted among Westphalia's most musically important peal of bells. The baptismal font was built in the 13th century. It is said that Anno of Cologne consecrated the church sometime between 1050 and 1075.

- Old Cistercian Monastery

Among the monasteries endowed by Mechthild of Sayn with her husband Henry III of Sayn is the Drolshagen Cistercian Monastery, which she founded in 1235. From the way the endowment document is worded, it seems that it was not meant as a founding document, but rather as a donation document with the character of an atonement endowment. In the course of Secularization in 1803, the monastery was dissolved, and between 1975 and 1987 it was thoroughly renovated. Today it houses the town building office and the music school, as well as rooms for special cultural events.

- Eichener Mühle

This former grist mill "Im Kreuzohl" was first mentioned in a document dating from 1512. The building, which is now under protection as a monument, is nowadays used by a private owner as a house.

- Waldkapelle Hünkesohl

The Marienkapelle (Mary's Chapel) is used every year for May prayers and is a favourite pilgrimage destination in the Drolshagen area. The chapel was built in the Marian Year 1954 out of wooden blocks.

=== Sport ===
The Drolshagen area is home to many sport clubs. The biggest are:

- TuS 09 Drolshagen e. V.
- Hützemerter Sportverein 1951 e. V.
- SC Drolshagen 1962 e. V.

The Harvest and Animal Show Festival in October attracts many visitors every year. At Carnival there is a parade on Altweibertag (“Old Women’s Day”) which is attended by many who come to watch. As well, there is a shooting festival every year.

== Economy and infrastructure ==
As is so almost everywhere in the Sauerland, the town's economy is characterized by midsize businesses. The main fields of activity are engine building, metalworking and electrical industries, paper processing, stoneworking, toolmaking, vehicle supply, building and crafts.

=== Transport ===
The town of Drolshagen lies inside the angle formed by the Olpe Autobahn interchange (Bundesautobahn 45 and Bundesautobahn 4). On Bundesautobahn 45, Drolshagen has its own exit, and also just within town limits is the Olpe exit. On Bundesautobahn 4 from Cologne, Drolshagen can be reached from the Eckenhagen/Drolshagen exit. Furthermore, the Bundesstraßen 54 and 55 run through Drolshagen.

The 144 bus stops are served by the Verkehrsbetriebe Westfalen-Süd (VWS) and the Oberbergische Verkehrsgesellschaft (OVAG).

== Famous people ==
=== Sons and daughters of the town ===
- Heinrich Bone, 25 September 1813 – 10 June 1893, Catholic educator, textbook editor, Catholic songbook publisher, hymn editor
- Emilie Engel, 1893 – 20 November 1955 in Koblenz-Metternich, teacher, nun, provincial head of the Schönstatt Movement (Beatification proceedings were begun in 1999.)
- Rupert Lay, 14 June 1929 –, philosopher and theologian
- Hubertus Halbfas, 1932 –, theologian, among other things author of a range of religious books for school instruction
- Otto Hellinghaus 1853–1935, philosopher and writer

== Gallery ==
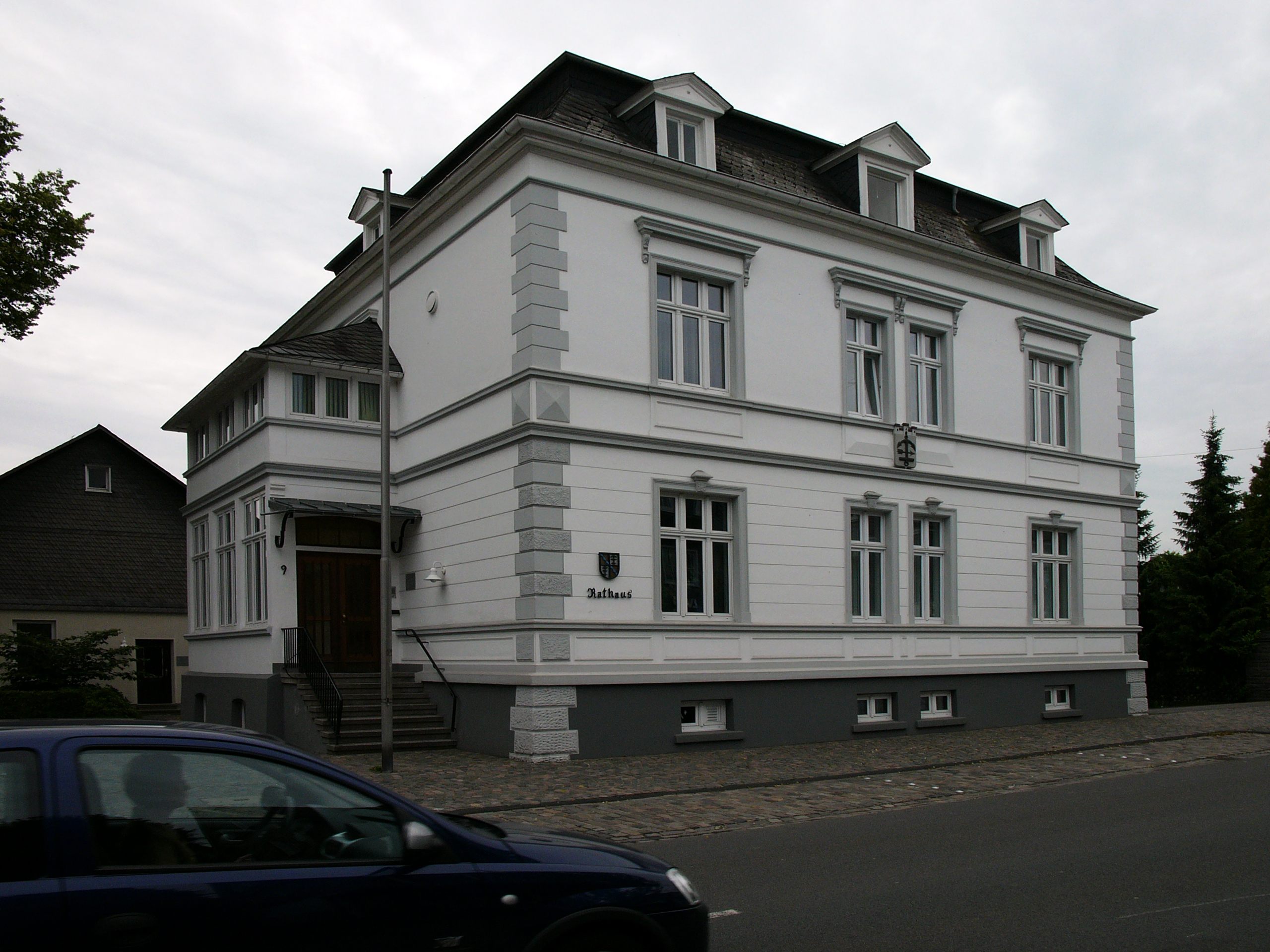
The Rathaus (town hall) of Drolshagen is rather small and some of the offices are located in nearby buildings.

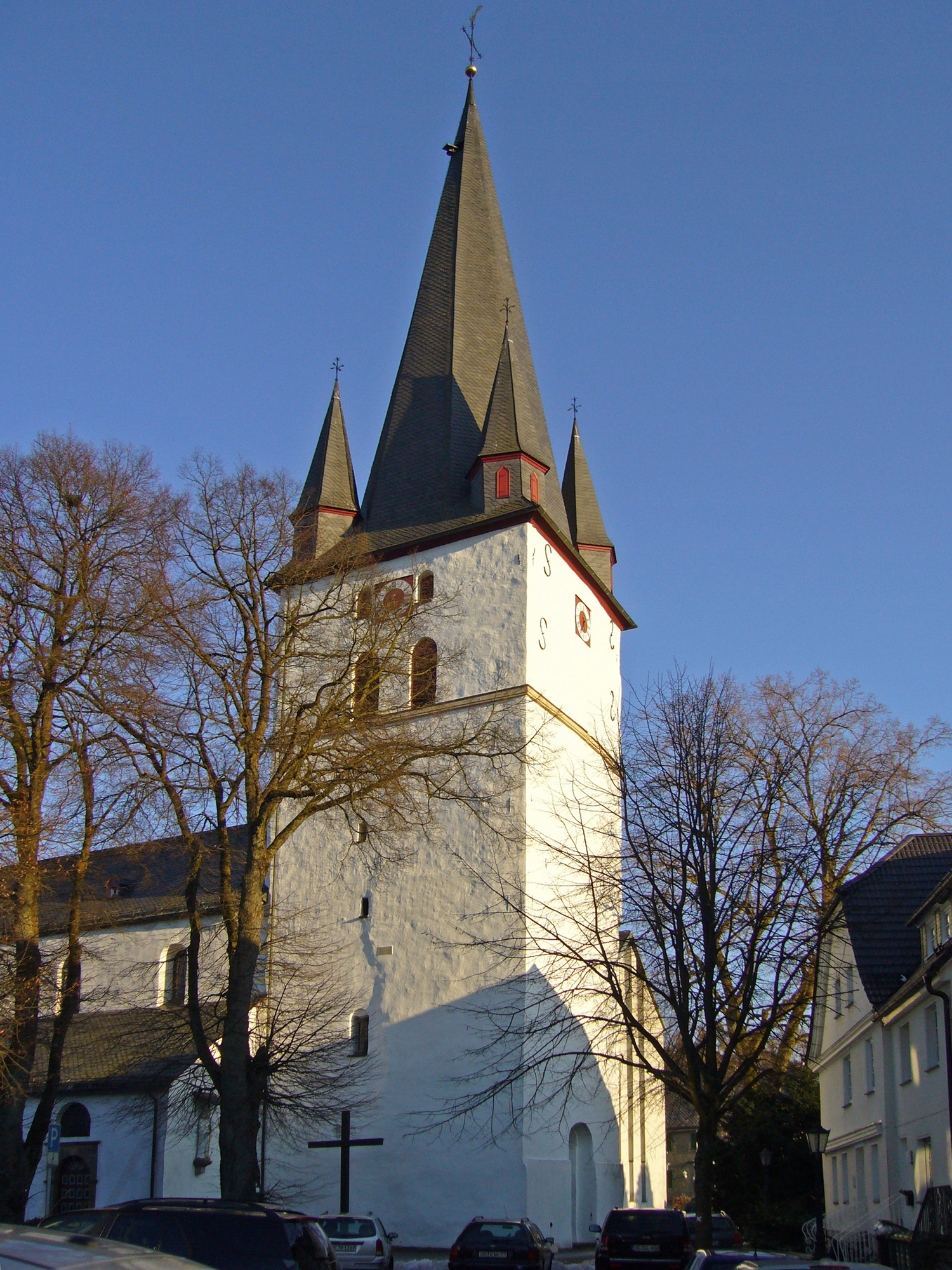
The belfry of St. Clement Church is the oldest part of the church and dates back to the 11th century.

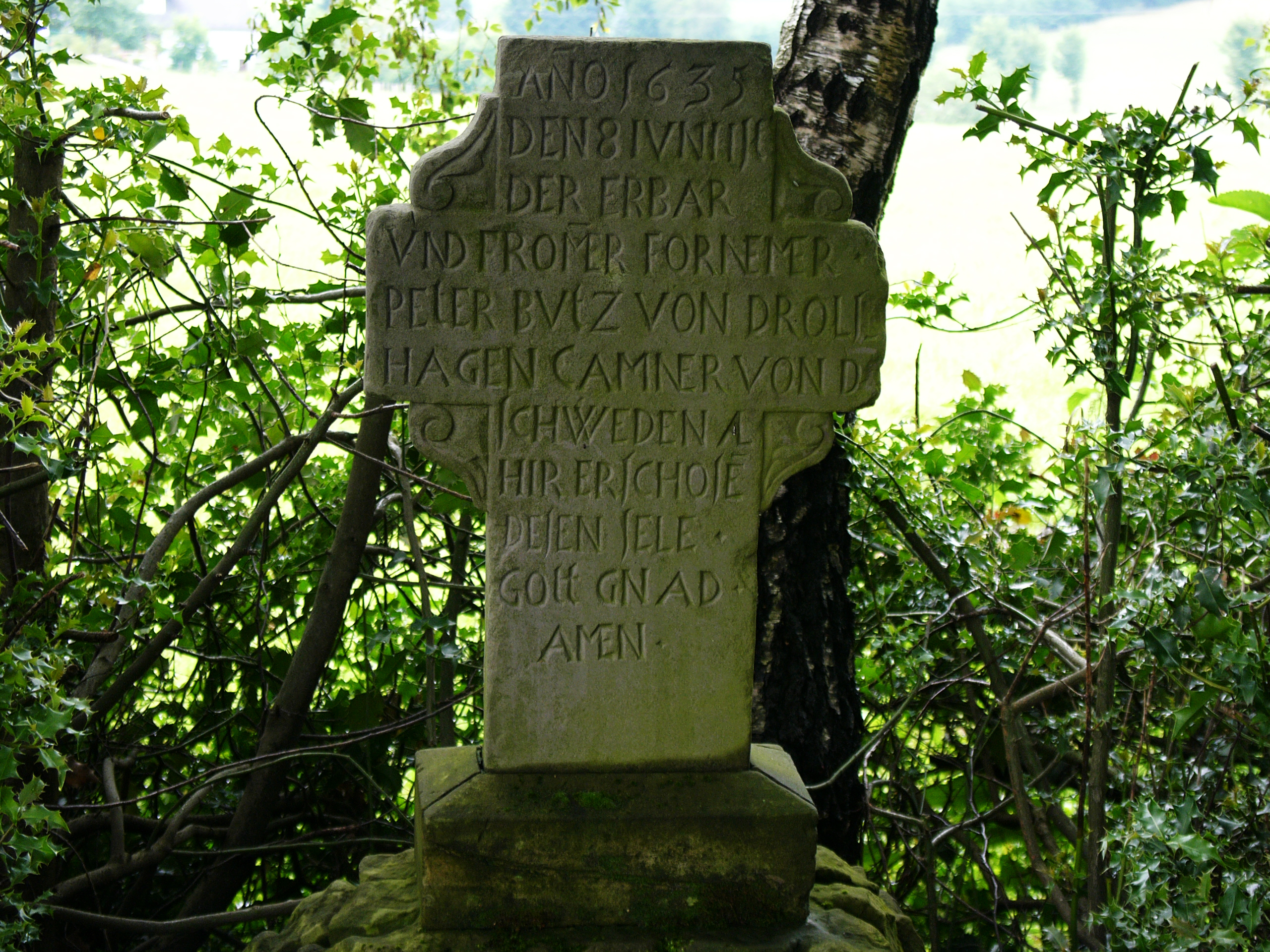
This stone was erected in memory of Peter Butz who was sent as an emissary to Swedish troops in 1635 to beg them to spare Drolshagen and was shot by them. The inscription says: "In 1635, June 8, the honourable and devout, noble Peter Butz from Drollhagen came here to the Swedes and was shot. His soul to God, mercy and amen."
