= Denklingen (Reichshof) =

Coordinates: 50°55′N 7°39′E

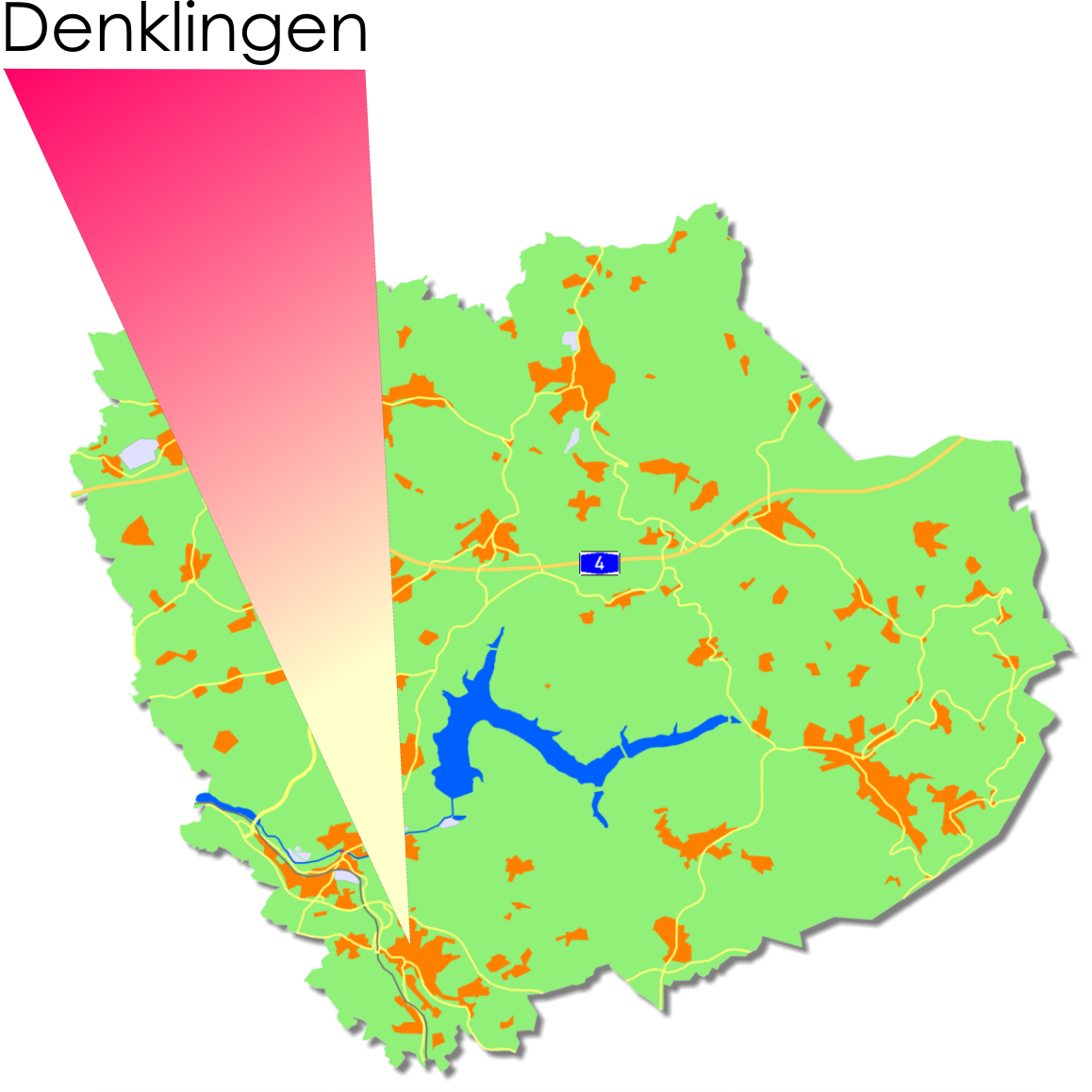
Position of Denklingen within Reichshof

Denklingen is one of 106 localities that make up the German municipality of Reichshof in the Oberbergischer Kreis. It is part of the region of Cologne in North Rhine-Westphalia. It is close to the towns of Gummersbach, Cologne, and Siegen. As of 31 December 2022, the population of Denklingen is 2.031. Denklingen is also Reichshof's administrative center.

== History ==
Historical population
Year	Pop.	±%
31.12.1991	1,495	—
31.12.2008	2,154	+44.1%
31.12.2020	1,986	−7.8%
31.12.2021	2,039	+2.7%
31.12.2022	2,031	−0.4%

Between the 16th and 18th century, a castle with an Evangelic chapel was built. The castle was renamed "Rentei" in 1672 when the administration of Windeck was moved to Denklingen Castle. The chapel became Catholic over the years and was purchased by the Catholic community in 1880. A proper Catholic church was built with the help of Paul Melchers from May 1885 to October 1886.

A rectory and a 33-meter-high church were built from 1889 to 1903 by the Evangelic community.

On 31 Oktober 1910, a railroad connecting the villages of Brüchermühle, Denklingen and Wildbergerhütte was opened. However, it never fulfilled the hopes of an economic upswing and was closed. It was completely dismantled in the early 1960s.
