= Wenden (Sauerland) =

- Town
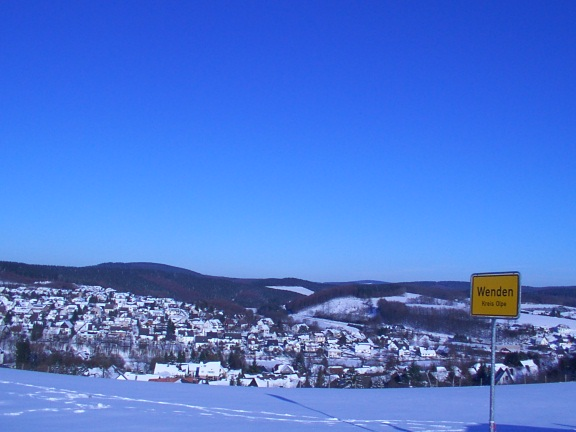
- Wenden

- Coat of arms

- Location of Wenden within Olpe district
- Interactive map of Wenden
- Location within Germany Location within North Rhine-Westphalia
- Coordinates: 50°58′N 07°52′E
- Country: Germany
- State: North Rhine-Westphalia
- Admin. region: Arnsberg
- District: Olpe
- Subdivisions: 30

Government
  - Mayor (2020–25): Bernd Clemens (CDU)

Area
  - Total: 72.56 km^{2} (28.02 sq mi)
- Elevation: 411 m (1,348 ft)

Population (2025-12-31)
  - Total: 19,462
  - Density: 268.2/km^{2} (694.7/sq mi)
- Time zone: UTC+01:00 (CET)
  - Summer (DST): UTC+02:00 (CEST)
- Postal codes: 57482
- Dialling codes: 02762
- Vehicle registration: OE
- Website: www.wenden.de

Wenden (German pronunciation: [ˈvɛndn̩]) is a municipality in North Rhine-Westphalia, Germany. It belongs to the Olpe district in the Sauerland. It lies 10 kilometres (6 miles) south of Olpe and 20 km (12 mi) northwest of Siegen.

== Geography ==
=== Location ===
Wenden lies at the southernmost tip of the Sauerland, an area of low mountain ranges. The Bigge and its tributaries, which feed into Biggesee, rise near Wenden. To the southeast a ridge separates the municipality from the adjoining Siegerland. In the southwest the municipal area borders Rhineland-Palatinate.

=== Neighbouring municipalities ===
Bordering on Wenden are Olpe and Drolshagen, which like Wenden lie in the Olpe district, Friesenhagen in Rhineland-Palatinate’s Altenkirchen district, Kreuztal, Freudenberg and Siegen (all in Siegen-Wittgenstein), and also Reichshof in the Oberbergischer Kreis.

=== Constituent municipalities ===
The municipality consists of three major villages: Wenden (3900 inhabitants), Hünsborn (3100) and Ottfingen (2200). Smaller villages are: Altenhof, Altenwenden, Brün, Eichen, Elben, Gerlingen, Heid, Hillmicke, Möllmicke, Römershagen, Rothemühle, Schönau and Vahlberg. Additionally, there are some hamlets: Bebbingen, Büchen, Döingen, Eichertshof, Girkhausen, Hoffnung, Huppen, Löffelberg, Rothenborn, Scheiderwald, Schwarzbruch, Trömbach, Wendenerhütte and Wilhelmstal.

=== Climate ===
Wenden's climate is very wet. West winds bring clouds that form over the Atlantic Ocean and they rise as they pass over the Sauerland and Wenden, which in turn brings rain. The coldest month is January. July is the warmest month. During winter fog forms frequently out of the moist air.

== History ==
The origins of the name Wenden are not known for certain. Probably it has to do with the location because at the turn of the first millennium within its area the lands of two Germanic people, the Franks and the Saxons met. There is no knowledge as to when the area was first settled. The names of some villages like Girkhausen, Bebbingen, Döingen, Gerlingen and Ottfingen as well as the names of lost villages and homesteads offer some clues. Most likely settlement must have taken place no later than around 900 to 1000 AD. Perhaps the area knew settlements even earlier as the names of local brooks and streams like Elbe, Albe, Wende, Bigge, Benze and Binse hint.

The first documented record of Wenden dates back to 1011. By that time a monastery had been founded in Herford and given land in Wendenne, which is said to mean turn (German: wenden). At the beginning of the 14th century a chapel Wendene capella is mentioned in a copy of a much older tax register of the Archdiocese of Cologne. Watersheds have been Wenden's limits for centuries. In the southeast and east these watersheds marked the boundary with the territory of Nassau-Siegen, in the south to the land of the counts of Wildenburg and in the south and southwest to the Duchy of Berg. All of the municipal area was part of the Electorate of Cologne. Following the Reformation they remained Catholic while their neighbours to the southeast, south and southwest converted to Protestantism.

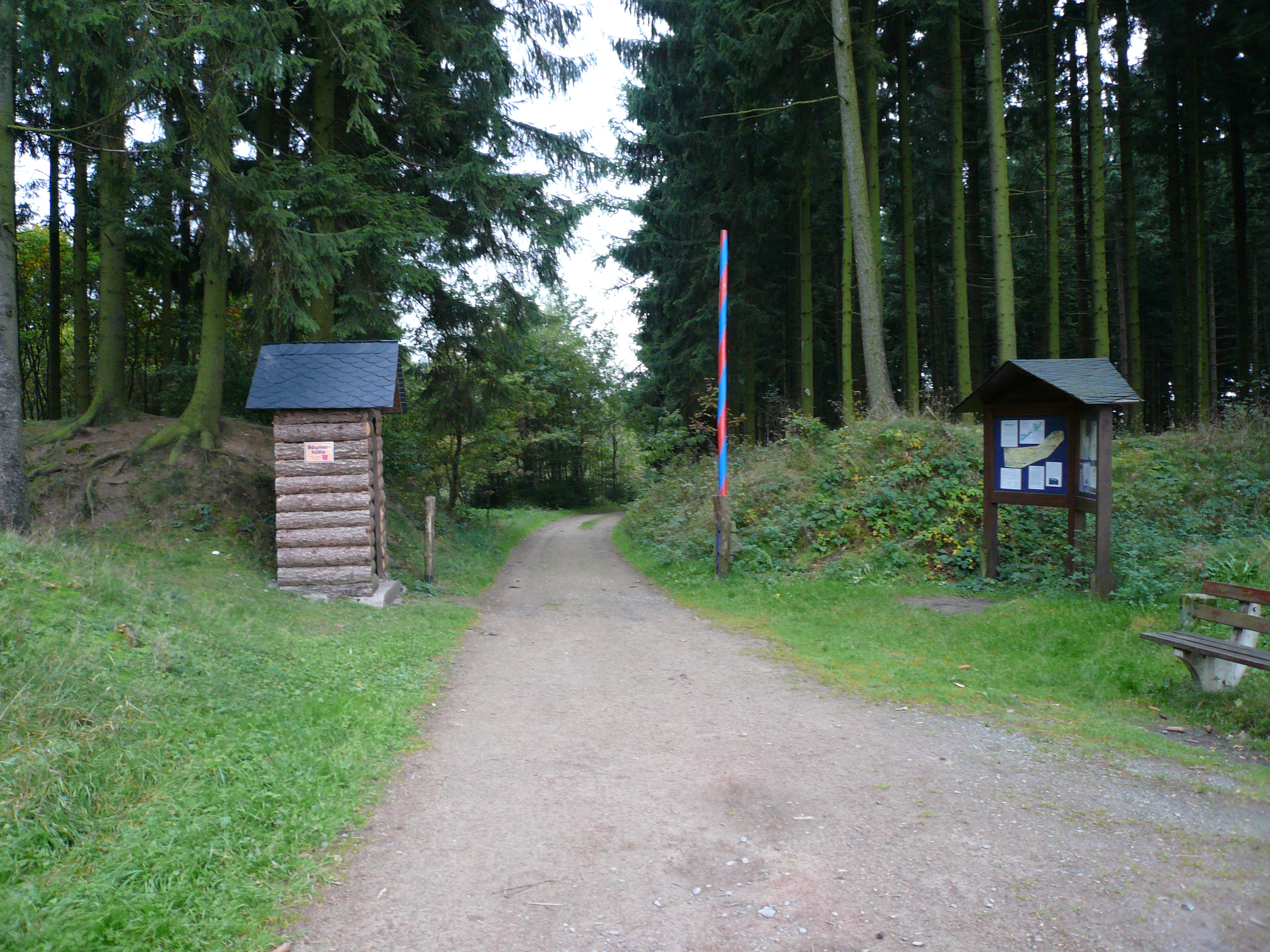
Opening in old earthwork marking boundary between Siegerland and Wenden near Hünsborn

By the end of the Middle Ages people in the Siegerland fenced off their territory with a combination of trenches, earthworks and dense hedgerows. That part which touches the district of Olpe is called the "Kölsches Heck" ("Cologne hedge"). The "Kölsches Heck" also marks a boundary between two languages High German and Low German. After the Reformation it came to mark the border between areas of different faiths.

In 1803 the municipal area of Wenden was transferred to the Grand Duchy of Hesse-Darmstadt and in 1816 it was annexed to Prussia. Some years later in 1850 the municipalities of Wenden and Römershagen were joined to form the new municipality of Wenden (Amt Wenden).

=== Religion ===
The great majority of the municipality dwellers adhere to the Catholic faith. With the exception of Möllmicke and Rothemühle, each of the municipality's bigger centres has a Catholic church or chapel at its disposal. After the Second World War many Germans driven out of the lost territories in the east moved into what was then the Amt of Wenden; they settled mostly in the centres of Vahlberg and Rothemühle. Thus arose the Evangelical Church of Rothemühle in the 1950s. In the 1980s there came a municipality centre in Wenden's main town which quickly outdid the church in Rothemühle. In 2006, a resolution was handed down by the Evangelical parish of Olpe, to which Wenden belongs, to abandon the church in Rothemühle. The Rothemühle chapel building club thereupon took over financial responsibility for the church, guaranteeing its continued existence for the time being. In the 1960s, many Muslims and Greek Orthodox Christians also came to the municipality of Wenden. For a few years, a mosque has been maintained in Wenden's main centre. A regionally important pilgrimage centre for Catholics is the Dörnschlade, found in the middle of the woods between the centres of Hünsborn, Wenden and Altenhof. According to legend, a Madonna statue stolen from the Wenden church was found there. A chapel is used by many believers for worship. Among others, the regional Katholische Arbeitnehmer-Bewegung (“Catholic Employees’ Movement”, KAB) uses the Dörnschlade for its yearly pilgrimage.

=== Amalgamations ===
The municipality of Wenden came into being in 1969 in the course of municipal restructuring in North Rhine-Westphalia. It is coëxtensive with the former Amt of Wenden, which itself consisted of the municipalities of Wenden and Römershagen.

== Population ==
Historical population

Year	Pop.	±% p.a.
1965	12,739	—
1970	13,949	+1.83%
1975	14,729	+1.09%
1980	15,245	+0.69%
1985	15,731	+0.63%
1990	16,932	+1.48%
1995	18,604	+1.90%

Year	Pop.	±% p.a.
2000	19,684	+1.13%
2005	19,820	+0.14%
2010	19,905	+0.09%
2015	19,873	−0.03%
2020	19,452	−0.43%
2025	19,462	+0.01%

Source: Landesdatabank Nordrhein-Westfalen

== Politics ==
=== Mayor ===
- 1994–2015: Peter Brüser, CDU
- 2015–incumbent: Bernd Clemens, CDU

=== Town partnerships ===
A partnership came about as a result of German unity with Dingelstädt in the former East Germany. The partnership was at first actively pursued, for instance through administrative employees’ exchanges, and continues today at a lower, but constant, level. For example, Dingelstädt's mayor is a regular guest at the great yearly event known as the Wendener Kirmes.

Currently, groundwork is being laid to build a partnership with the Hungarian town of Lepsény. The packaging firm SiBO maintains branch offices in both Wenden and Lepsény. Owner Bernd Hesse blazed the trail for this budding partnership.

== Culture and sightseeing ==
=== Theatre ===
The Sauerland-Theater Hillmicke is a successful amateur theatre, and performs every November in the Wenden school centre's auditorium.

=== Museums ===
The Wendener Hütte is a technological cultural monument and one of the oldest still preserved charcoal furnace works in the German-speaking world. It can be viewed free during opening hours.

=== Music ===
The municipality of Wenden is well known for its great number of concert bands, music clubs, bands and choirs. Almost every centre has a concert band and several choirs at its disposal. The Spielmannszug Wenden (band) celebrates its centenary in 2008, holding a great festival weekend on 18–20 April.

=== Buildings ===
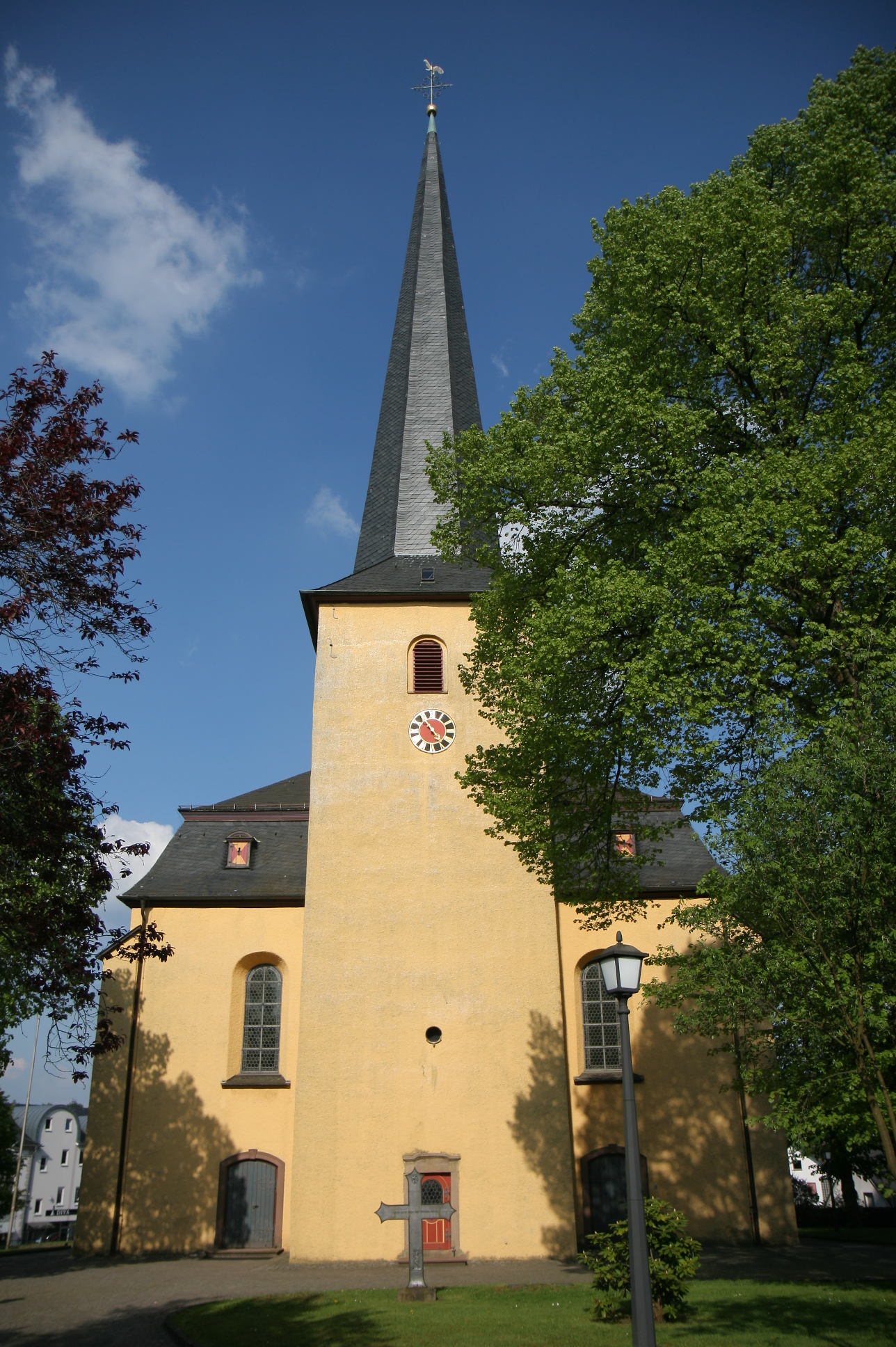
St. Severinus parish church

The Dörnschlade pilgrimage chapel was built in the mid 19th century and is found near Altenhof. It can easily be reached by the road running between Hünsborn and Wenden. On the Sundays after the Festivals of the Assumption (2 July) and the Nativity of Mary (8 September), a procession from Altenhof and Wenden to the Dörnschlade takes place, which is then finished with a church service there.

The St. Severinus parish church was built about 1750. The altars and most holy figures already adorned the forerunner church, from which also came the bulky tower, the new church having been built over the old one, which was then only knocked down after construction on the new one was well under way. The holy objects were all transferred to the new church. The pulpit, the Resplendent Madonna and the organ, however, were acquired new in 1755. The new church's namesake may have been St. Severin's Church in Cologne. The last thorough renovation was done between 1986 and 1988, with the church being made over as far as possible to look as it did when it was built in the 18th century.

=== Natural monuments ===
The source of the river Bigge lies near Römershagen. The stream, where it rises is still only very small, runs for 16 km, then filling one of Germany's biggest reservoirs, the Biggesee.

=== Sport ===
- The Vereinigte Sport-Vereine Wenden 1930 e. V. in Wenden-Schönau (football) played in the Verbandsliga until 2003, but are now in the Landesliga. They have an artificial-turf pitch at their disposal.
- The DAC 01, Wenden plays skittles in a Landesliga at the Bundeskegelbahn Gasthof Wurm (“Bützers”) in Schönau.
- The SG Wenden already boasts various successes in athletics, among them Simon Huckestein, sixth in the 2005 German Championship over 800 m. The club was built up significantly by squad trainer Egon Bröcher's work, and by Kunibert Rademacher (currently the chairman for district athletics). The club organizes the traditional Südsauerlandlauf (“South Sauerland Walk”) which draws up to 800 participants. It is held every year on the first weekend in November. Training is done on the Tartan track at the Gerlingen sporting grounds and at the gymnasium at the Wenden school centre.

=== Regular events ===
- The Wendsche Kärmetze (Kirmes) is held on the third Tuesday in August as well as on the Saturday and Sunday before that. On Tuesday there is an animal show with prizes awarded to animals in various classes. Another thing that sets the Wendsche Kärmetze apart is that throughout the time when it is being held, there is a market at which the most varied things are for sale. Besides the many market dealers, many amusement ride operators bring their carousels and other attractions. The Wenden Kirmes is the biggest event of its kind in the South Westphalia area.
- The Schönauer Karneval is a high point at Carnival time in South Westphalia celebrated with, besides the Prinzenproklamation (about 11 November), Altweiber (“Old Women’s Day”), Prunksitzung (a sitting of the “Elves’ Council” – actually a revue) and Rosenmontagszug (“Shrove Monday Parade”) also with three further events under marquees. Elaborate floats and many groups on foot on Shrove Monday combine to form a miles-long lindworm that wends its way through Schönau's streets watched by 15,000 onlookers in this centre of only 1,400 souls. The Schönau carneys’ battle call goes “Schönau Helau”. The club song begins with the lines “Von Schönau bis Bockenbach – da wird geschunkelt und gelacht” (roughly “From Schönau to Bockenbach – there will be swaying to and fro and laughing”), Bockenbach being a neighbouring place in the Siegerland. Over more than 40 years, the Schönau-Altenwenden Carnival Club has established itself very firmly in South Westphalian Carnival life. Its two dancing guards, the Rote and Blaue Funken (Red and Blue Sparks), represent the club at many regional and national events.
- The Ottfinger Schützenfest (“Ottfingen Shooting Festival”) is traditionally held on the third weekend in June and is the biggest of its kind in the municipality of Wenden. The festival begins with a parade through the village, with the new King and Queen being determined thereafter in a bird-shooting contest. The high point is the joint celebrating in the marksmen's tent on Saturday evening.
- The Südsauerlandlauf, a traditional walking event that held its 30th edition in 2005 is usually held on the first weekend in November by the Sportgemeinschaft Wenden (“Wenden Sport Association”). In past years, the event has even welcomed successful walking aces such as Sabrina Mockenhaupt in 2005. There are the Bambinilauf (500 m), Schülerläufe (2 km for schoolchildren), Volkslauf (5 km for the general public), Hauptlauf (the “main” walk of 10 km) and Nordic Walking (9 km) which draw up to 800 participants, making it the biggest walking event in South Westphalia. It has been integrated as a walking event into the Ausdauer-Cup.

== Economy and infrastructure ==
The economic development of the area depended mostly on iron ore and heavy spar deposits as well as an abundance of wood and water. In 1855 there were 7 smelting works in the district of Olpe, 5 of which lay in the Wenden municipal area. While most smelting works produced pig iron, the Wendener Hütte, a mill founded by Johannes Elmert in 1728, made crude steel. Like others which fired their blast furnaces with locally produced charcoal, the Wendener Hütte lost out to the developing coal-based steel industry in the Ruhr Area. The Wendener Hütte closed down in 1866. In the years after World War II the majority of the local population was working in agriculture. But when farming changed to more intensive farming with larger farms specialising in cattle and dairy farming, most small farmers gave up. People shifted out of farming and sought employment in manufacturing in neighbouring Olpe and the Siegerland.

This all changed when Bundesautobahn 45 was completed in 1971 and Bundesautobahn 4 opened to traffic in 1976. With quick access to other areas of Germany, Wenden was able to attract larger operations and build a solid economic infrastructure.

=== Established enterprises ===
- CAMCO (professional audio power amplifiers)
- Dia-therm (heater factory)
- Berker
- Elexis-Gruppe with the firms EMG and Drehmo
- Prime Drilling GmbH (Horizontal Directional Drilling)

=== Transport ===
==== Roads ====
The municipality of Wenden is connected to two Autobahnen, the A4 (Aachen–Görlitz, links the area to Cologne in the west) and the A45 (connects Wenden northwards to Dortmund and the Ruhr Area and southwards to Giessen and Frankfurt), both with an interchange at Wenden at the Olpe-Süd Autobahn cross. There are, however, no Federal highways (Bundesstraßen) running through the municipality. The main thoroughfares are the highways (Landstraßen) L342, L512, L564, L714 and L905.

The eastward extension of the A4 in 2006 connects it to the Hüttentalstrasse linking Wenden to Kreuztal and Siegen.

==== Bus and rail transport ====
For local public road transport there are many bus lines that also join Wenden with neighbouring municipalities. Operators are the Verkehrsbetriebe Westfalen-Süd (VWS, “Westphalia-South Transport Services”), whose seat is in Siegen and which is a daughter company of the Stadtwerke Bonn, and the railway daughter company Busverkehr Ruhr-Sieg (BRS, “Ruhr-Sieg Bus Transport”). Lines R50 and R51 are the most important buslines, running from Siegen and Olpe to Wenden.

Nowadays there is no longer any rail transport in the municipal area. There was formerly a rail connection to the Biggetalbahn (railway). The stretch running between Freudenberg and Rothemühle, however, was abandoned by 1987, while the Rothemühle-Olpe stretch had its service withdrawn in 2000, and in 2005 it was dismantled.

== Public institutions ==
=== Education ===
Wenden has got two secondary schools and several primary schools but no Gymnasium.

Schools and educational institutions in Wenden
Elementary schools	Secondary schools
Katholische Grundschule Gerlingen	Hauptschule: Konrad-Adenauer-Schule Gemeinschaftshauptschule
Katholische Grundschule Hünsborn	Realschule: Realschule Wenden
Katholische Grundschule Ottfingen	Special schools
Biggetal-Grundschule Rothemühle	Geschwister-Scholl-Schule, Förderschule mit dem Förderschwerpunkt emotionale und soziale Entwicklung
Westerberg-Schule Katholische Grundschule Wenden	

== Famous people ==
=== Sons and daughters of the municipality ===
- Johannes Dornseiffer (born 2 February 1837 in Wenden-Gerlingen; died 11 December 1914 in Eslohe), vicar in Fretter and pastor in Eslohe, founder of the (agricultural) Winterschule (“Winter School”) in Fretter, stands as cofounder of many savings and loan companies in the Finnentrop-Eslohe area in personal contact with Friedrich Wilhelm Raiffeisen.
- P. Maurus Kaufmann OSB (born in Elben; died 1948 in Jerusalem), first abbot of the Abbey of the Dormition in Jerusalem.
- Dr. Kaspar Klein (born 28 August 1865 in Elben; died 26 January 1941 in Paderborn), 1930 - 1941 Archbishop of Paderborn
- Wilhelm Schneider, (born 4 September 1847 in Gerlingen; died 31 August 1909 in Paderborn) Bishop in the Archbishopric of Paderborn.
