= Schwalbe Tires =

German bicycle tire maker

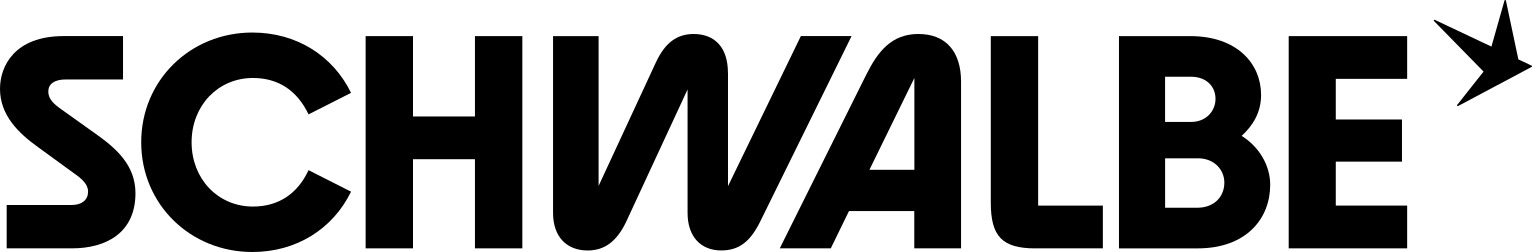
- Product type: tires and tubes for bicycles
- Produced by: Ralf Bohle GmbH
- Country: Germany
- Introduced: 1973
- Website: schwalbe.com

Schwalbe Tires is a brand name of Ralf Bohle GmbH, a German manufacturer of pneumatic tires for bicycles and wheelchairs. Schwalbe produces a wide range of tires for different cycling applications, but is best known for its commuting, touring and utility tires such as the Marathon range. Schwalbe also makes and markets tires for a variety of small wheel sizes, such as used on folding, BMX, children's, and recumbent bicycles, and on bicycle trailers.

== Company background ==
=== Structure ===
Schwalbe Tires is based in Reichshof-Wehnrath near Cologne, Germany. Manufacturing is carried out in their Indonesian factory, which is co-owned with its Korean joint-venture, production partner, PT Hung-A, and in its Vietnamese factory. Ralf Bohle GmbH is headquartered in Reichshof. Its parent company is Schwalbe Holding GmbH. Ralf Bohle GmbH also includes subsidiaries in England, France, Italy, the Netherlands, and the United States. In the 2023 fiscal year, the company generated revenues of €237.5 million and employed an average of 312 staff members.

=== History ===
The origins of Schwalbe and the company Ralf Bohle GmbH date back to 1922, when Eugen and Willy Bohle founded an export business for bicycle parts of European manufacture in Bergneustadt. During World War II, the company's activities were limited to domestic wholesale, and it only rebuilt its international contacts after the end of the war.

In 1955, Ralf Bohle joined his father Eugen's company. After the oil crisis of the early 1970s, he shifted the business model from exporting to importing bicycle components from Asia. In 1973, the company began its collaboration with the South Korean tire manufacturer Hung-A, whose products were initially sold in Germany under the brand name "Swallow" and later under the name "Schwalbe" (German for "swallow").

In the 1980s, the mountain bike boom led to Schwalbe temporarily holding a market share of around 60% among German original equipment manufacturers. At the end of the decade, rising labor costs in South Korea led to production being relocated to a newly built plant in Jakarta, Indonesia, which opened in 1991. In 1995, the Ralf Bohle GmbH moved its headquarters from Bergneustadt to Reichshof.

On April 25, 2010, Ralf Bohle passed away at the age of 75. Under the leadership of Frank Bohle, who had been part of the management since the early 2000s, the company continued to expand and benefited particularly from the e-bike boom of the 2010s and 2020s. In 2015, the company, together with Hung-A, commissioned an additional plant in Vietnam, as the production capacities in Indonesia were no longer sufficient. In 2021, the company moved into a new headquarters within Reichshof.

== Products ==
=== Tires ===
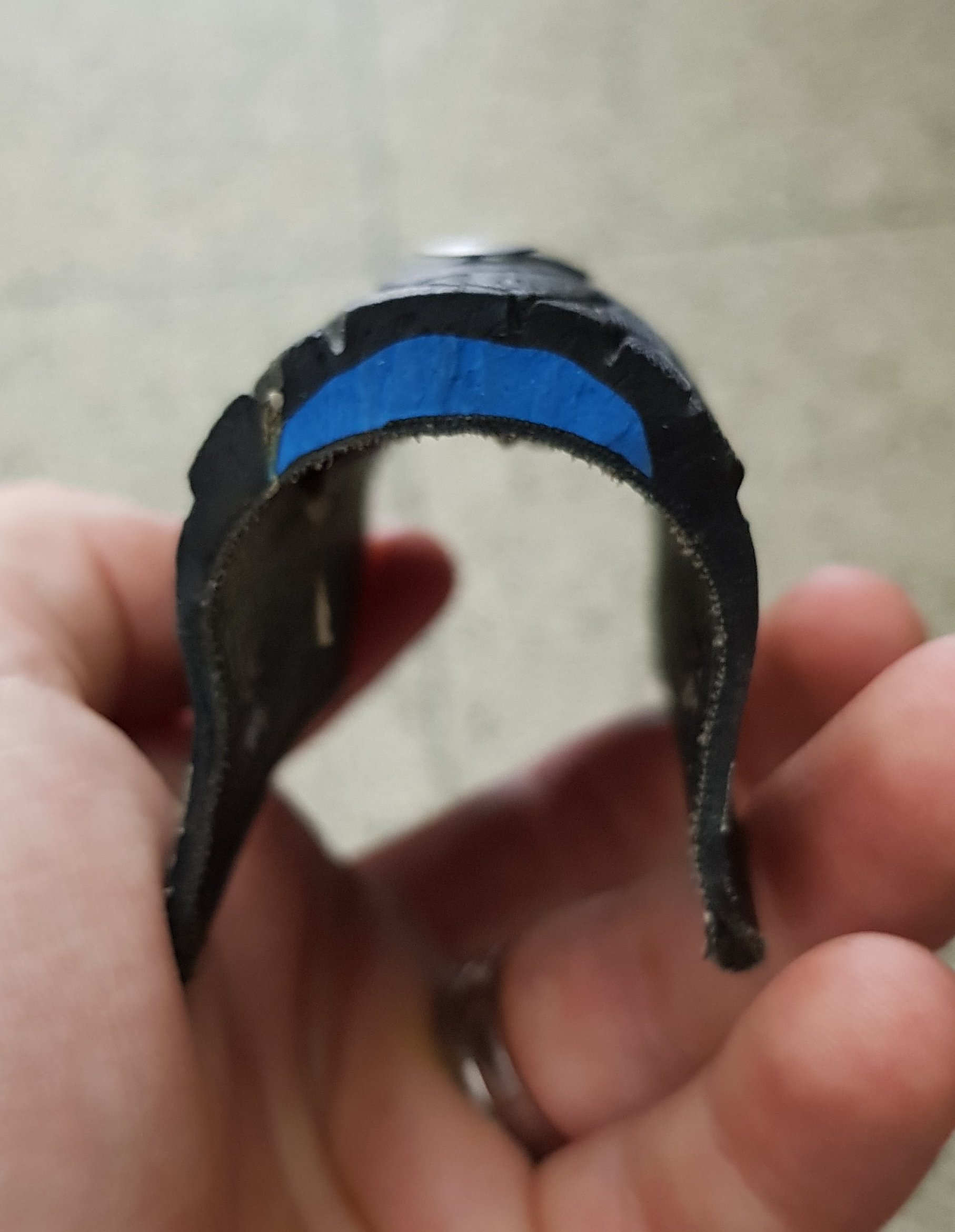
Cross-section of a Schwalbe tire with puncture protection (colored blue)

Schwalbe tires are produced for all types of bicycles and e-bikes and are therefore available in nearly all widths and diameters used in the bicycle sector. In 1986, the first Marathon tire was manufactured, which became known through a bicycle tour around the world undertaken by Bremen teacher Wolfgang Reiche from 1981 to 1985. Reiche rode on Schwalbe products and later remained associated with the company as a test rider and brand ambassador.

Other models include, among others, the Big Apple, a balloon bike tire introduced in 2004, special variants for e-bikes such as the Marathon E-Plus, as well as the tire with a radial carcass introduced in 2024. In 2023, the Green Marathon was introduced, a tire made of roughly 80% recycled and renewable materials.

In addition to tires, accessories are also offered, such as valve components, sealants, and tire levers. In 2024, Schwalbe introduced the Clik Valve system, a bicycle valve intended to replace conventional valve types. The system allows one-handed operation without a screw or lever mechanism, and audibly clicks into place when attaching the pump. The Clik Valve is backward-compatible with existing pump systems. In collaboration with the pump manufacturer SKS Germany, compatible pump heads and adapters were also developed.

Schwalbe tires are produced entirely at the Schwalbe plant in Vietnam. This is a joint venture with the Korean family-owned company Hung-A. In addition to Schwalbe, Bohle also produces tires under the brand name Impac. Schwalbe works with the non-governmental organization Fair Rubber.

=== Tubes ===
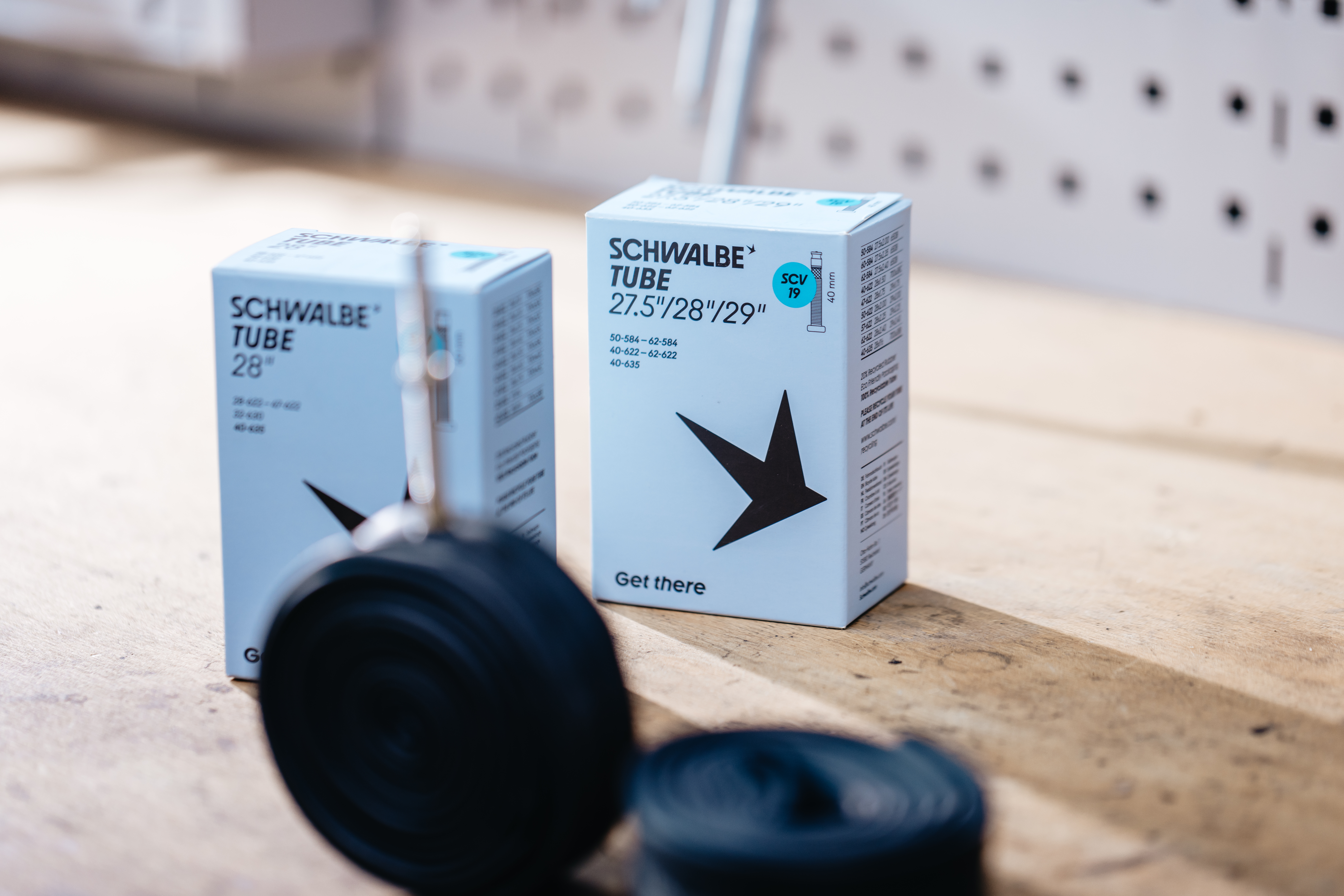
Schwalbe butyl tube with Clik Valve

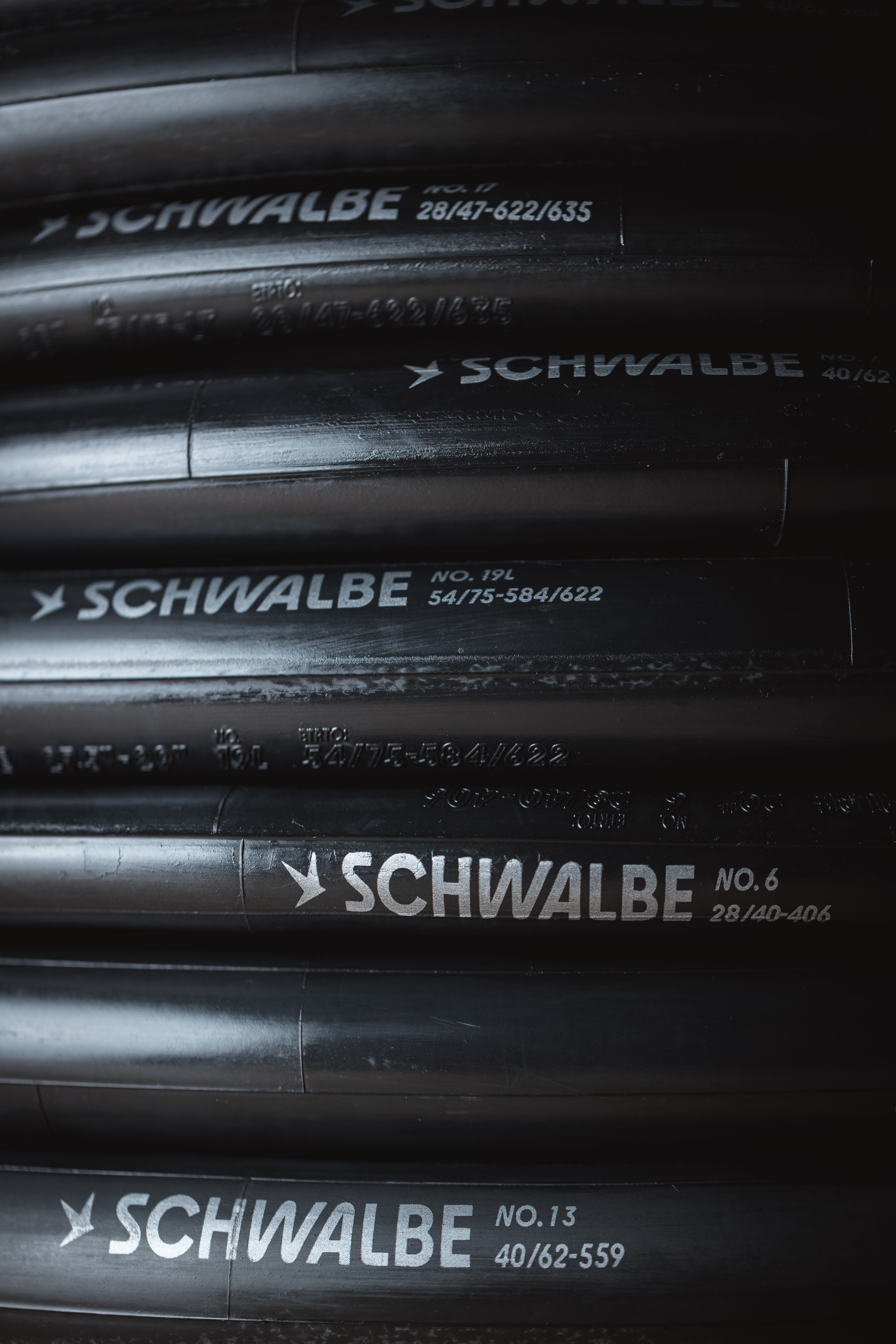
Different Schwalbe tubes

A number of tubes are produced under the Schwalbe brand that cover a range of tire widths. In 2020, a reinforced tube group called Air Plus was introduced, designed to retain air up to 50% longer. In addition, a tube made from thermoplastic polyurethane called Aerothan was developed for mountain bikes and road bikes. It was developed together with BASF and also uses pyrolysis oil from end-of-life tires as a raw material.

== Sponsoring ==
Schwalbe Tires sponsors a number of high-profile athletes, including Jonas Deichmann, Valentina Höll, and Amaury Pierron; as well as the retired athletes Fabian Cancellara, André Greipel and Amity Rockwell during their careers. The company also sponsors professional cycling teams, for example Canyon–SRAM and Tudor Pro Cycling Team. Schwalbe is the namesake of the table tennis club TTC Schwalbe Bergneustadt, and of the Schwalbe-Arena, a multifunctional arena with a capacity of around 4,000 spectators that was built in Gummersbach in 2012/13 and serves as the home arena of professional handball club VfL Gummersbach. The naming rights were extended for another five years in 2025. Furthermore, since 2021 the Ralf Bohle GmbH has supported German wheelchair basketball and thus the national teams of both men and women.

In January 2015, the company began operating a tube return program, in which used bicycle tubes are collected and recycled. By 2025, more than 15 million tubes had been returned, and the return program has been expanded to additional countries such as the Netherlands, Belgium, and the United Kingdom.
