= Wendener Hütte =

Industrial Age Mill in Germany

Coordinates: 50°58′14.90″N 7°49′40.76″E

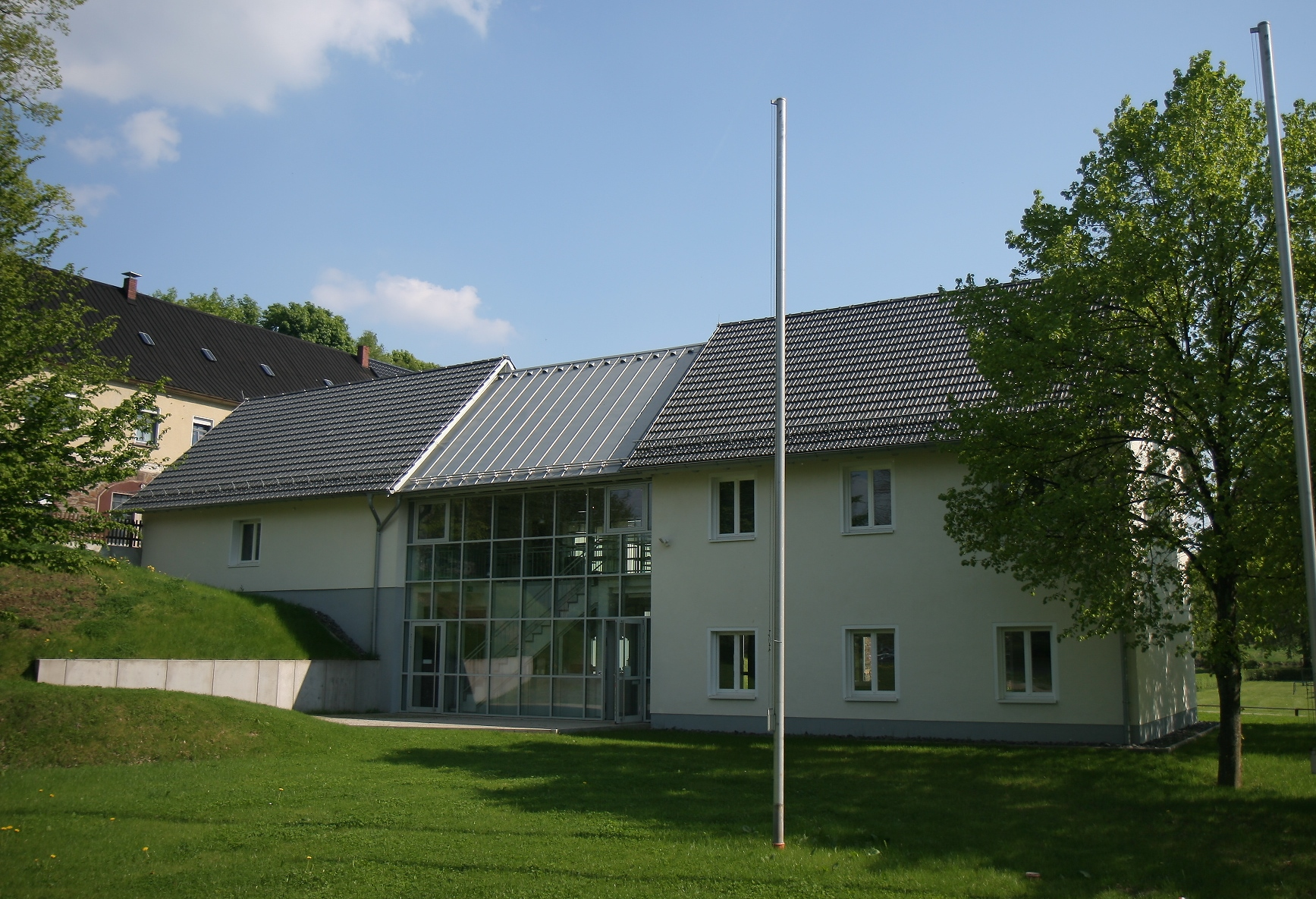
Main building

Wendener Hütte is a retired Industrial Age ironworks and hammer mill located near Wenden, Germany. The complete site, supported and run by Museumsverein Wendener Hütte e.V., is open to visitors from April to October.

== History ==
The birth of a small scale iron processing industry in the district of Olpe, in North Rhine-Westphalia, Germany was favoured by deposits of iron ore and heavy spar as well as an abundance of water and woods. Wendener Hütte was founded in 1728 close to the village of the same name near Wenden at a stream of the name Bigge. The founders where Peter and Johann Ermert from Betzdorf to whom the Elector Clement August, Archbishop of Cologne, had given a concession. Some years later Wendener Hütte came into possession of the Remy family which counts among the pioneers of the German iron industry.

In 1774 the first hammer capable of refining iron into steel was added to Wendener Hütte. The steel it produced was of a quality that allowed it to be sold at the Rotterdam steel market. The change from charcoal powered furnaces to coal powered ones in the Ruhr Area, as well as a new rail line from Siegen to Hagen, started the demise of iron processing in the region. In 1866 Wendener Hütte was shut down.

== The site ==
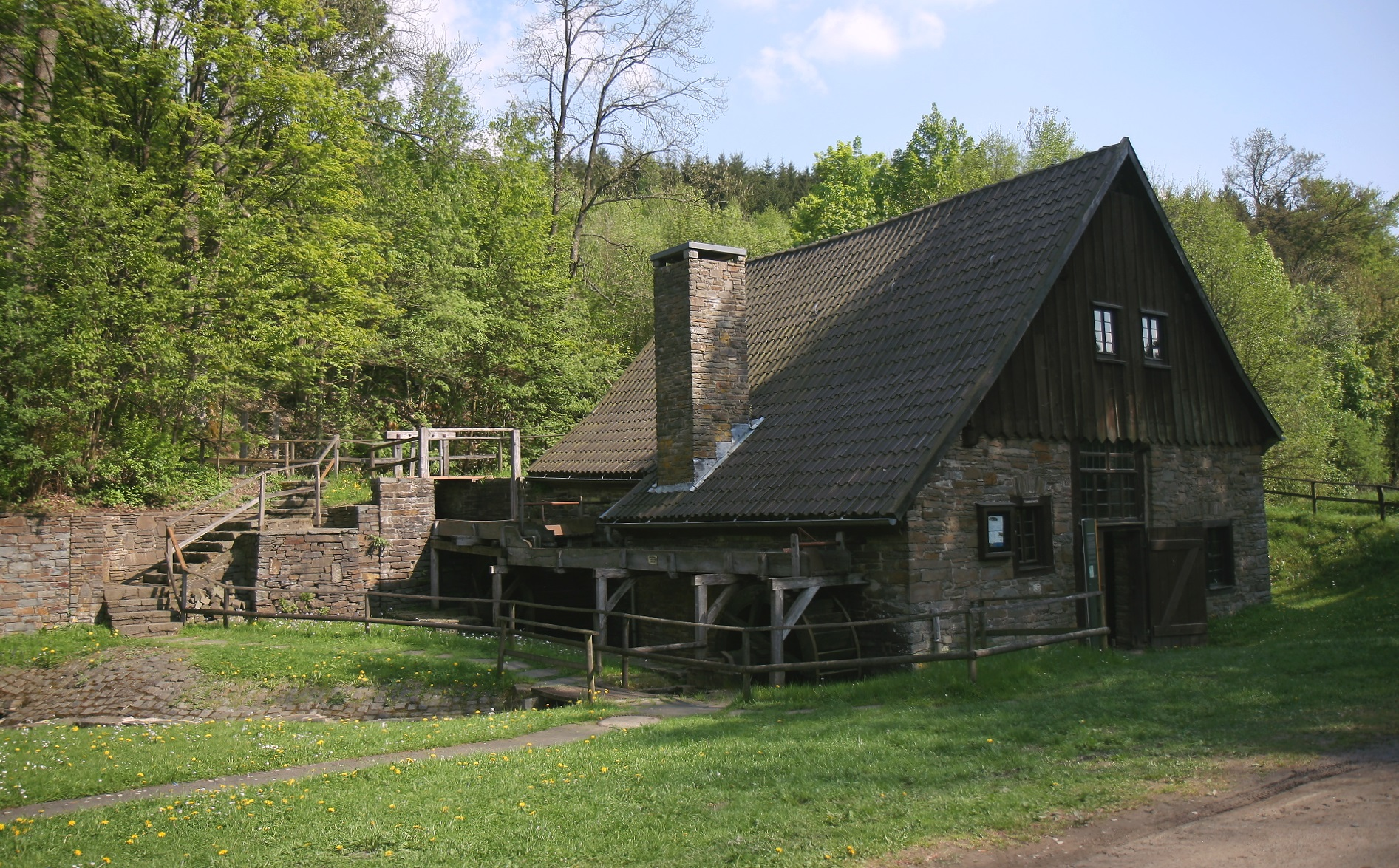
Hammer-mill

Wendener Hütte consists of 7 buildings in all: a residential building, a former horse stable, a coach-house, a casting room with Möllerboden and furnace, a boiler house, a store-room and a hammer-mill.

== Archive ==
There are documents relating to Wendener Hütte's history and the history of manufacturing and commerce in the greater area and beyond exists. All these documents are now kept at Westfälischen Wirtschaftsarchiv in Dortmund. The body of papers comprises 699 numbers from five periods. Documents include journals and contracts from the time of Wendener Hütte in possession of Ermert family and account books and journals from the years when Remy family owned the ironworks. Furthermore, there are letters and detailed construction plans, floor plans, sketches, price comparison to English merchandise and other papers.
