= Ehreshoven Castle =

Moated castle in Engelskirchen, Germany

- Schloss Ehreshoven
- Near Ehreshoven, Germany
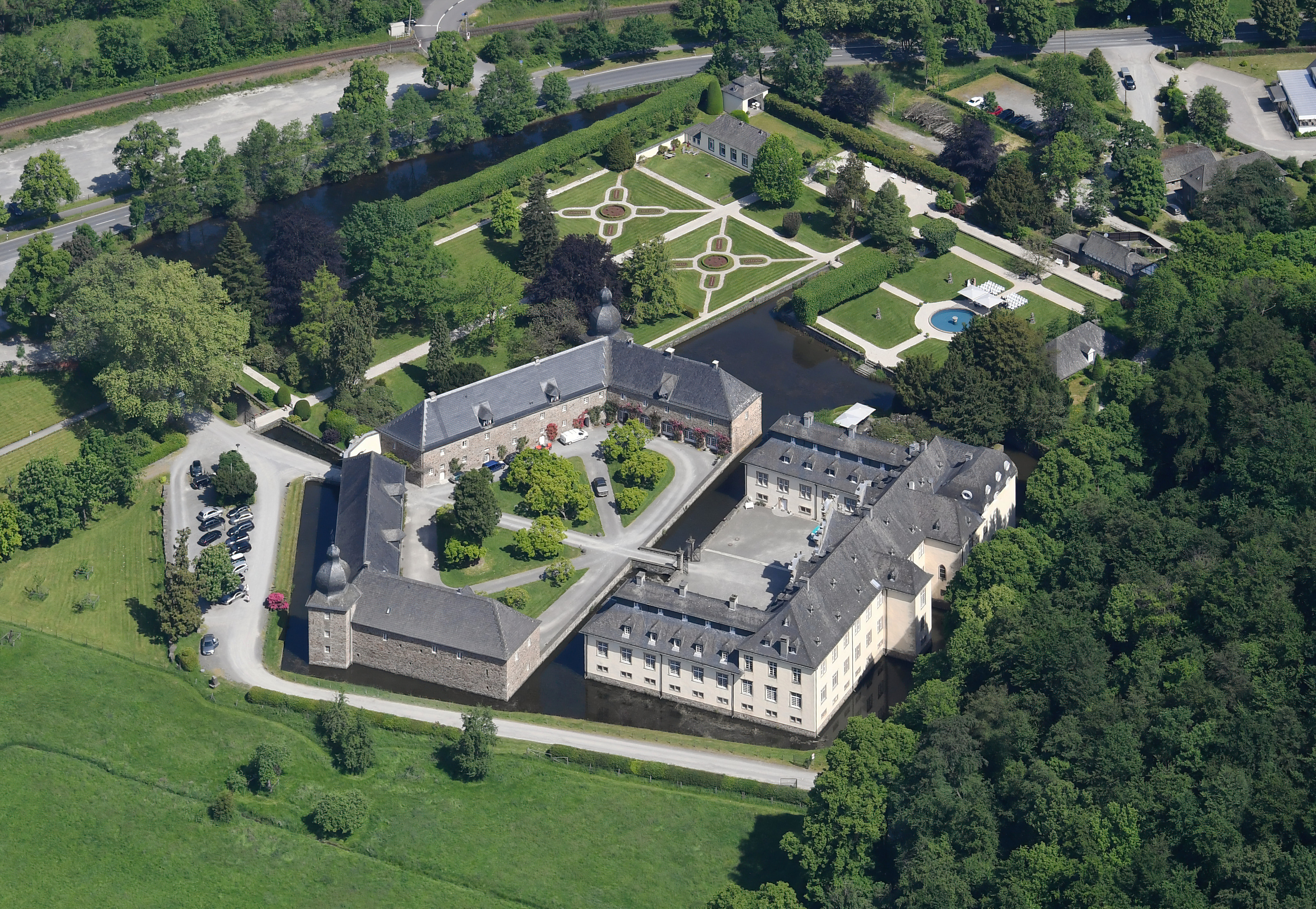
- Ehreshoven Castle

Site information
- Owner: Rhenish knighthood as a ladies' convent
- Controlled by: Rhenish knighthood as a ladies' convent
- Open to the public: No

Location
- Coordinates: 50.9741°N 7.3442°E
- Height: 160 m

Site history
- Built: 1355
- Built by: Count of Nesselrode
- Materials: Quarrystone

Ehreshoven Castle (German: Schloss Ehreshoven) is a moated castle in Engelskirchen, Oberbergischer Kreis, North Rhine-Westphalia, Germany. It is located near the village of Ehreshoven, about 32 kilometres (20 mi) by road east of Cologne. Several kilometres to the northwest is Georghausen Castle.

== History ==
The castle was originally owned by Siegburg Abbey, which had been founded in 1164 by Archbishop Anno of Cologne. Ehreshoven was first mentioned in 1355 when it existed as a house or small castle. In 1396 it was given to the family of the count of Nesselrode and stayed in their possession until 1920.

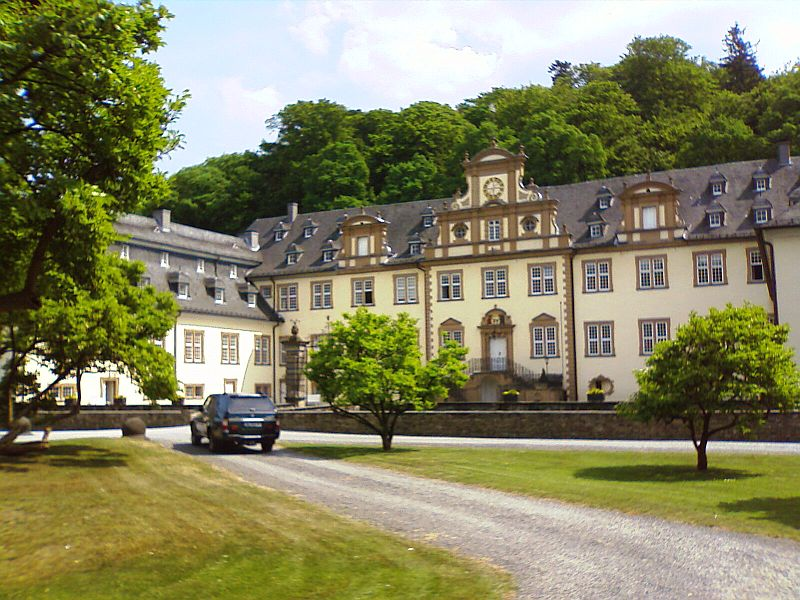

Under Wilhelm of Nesselrode, the house was essentially remodelled and the medieval chapel built into the structure in 1595. At the end of the 17th century, Philipp Wilhelm Christoph von Nesselrode and his wife built a new house integrating just the chapel and the northern part of the original castle. The three-winged manor house and the big four-winged front house were built at this time. In the early 18th century, a French garden was installed in the north of the castle which is mainly intact today.

The last owner was Marie Countess of Nesselrode who died unmarried in 1920 and bequeathed the whole estate to the Rheinische Ritterschaft. In 1924, they transformed it into a charitable foundation for Cannonesses. Only parts of the original medieval buildings remain at the rear of the castle of today. The chapel is part of the original buildings incorporated into the present manor house. In 1990, the whole manor house was renovated from the outside and the original building was repainted in a light yellow colour.

In the TV series Verbotene Liebe, the castle was the residence of the fictional Count Johannes von Lahnstein, one of the richest men in Germany.
