= Harald Fischer =

German chiropractor

- Born: Gummersbach, Germany
- Died: November 15, 2000 (aged 68); Beit Jala, West Bank
- Cause of death: Missile Attack
- Occupation: Doctor
- Spouse: Norma
- Children: Daniel, Raphaela, Asanja

Harald Fischer (died November 15, 2000) was a German chiropractor residing in the West Bank since coming to Palestine in 1981 to work for a German charity. After retiring from professional life, Fischer continued to provide free medical care to local residents.

He was residing with his Palestinian wife in Beit Jala near Bethlehem when his village was attacked by Israeli helicopter gunships. Fischer initially took cover under a stairwell with his wife, but later left his home to assist an injured neighbor whose house had been partially destroyed in the attack. As he entered the street Fischer was struck and instantly killed by an Israeli missile that left one of his legs severed and his body riddled with shrapnel. Fischer's 17-year-old son Danial recounting his father's death in an interview with the Chicago Tribune said "Sometime during the night we heard our neighbors, the Assaf family, cry out for help," he recalled "Their house was hit and on fire. Dad ran out into the street. He made it only halfway to the Assafs. We couldn't even get any ambulance into the street. The Israelis were firing at it."

In response to the killing German foreign minister Joschka Fischer declared he was "shocked and horrified". Two days after his death Fischer's body, draped in a Palestinian flag and escorted by police officers from the Palestinian Authority, which regarded Fischer as a martyr, was given a funeral at Evangelical Lutheran Church of the Reformation and buried near his home. Fischer was the first Lutheran to die in the Israeli-Palestinian conflict and the first foreigner to die in the Al-Aqsa Intifada.
