= Georghausen Castle =

German castle

- Schloss Georghausen
- Near Gimborn Georghausen, Lindlar, Germany
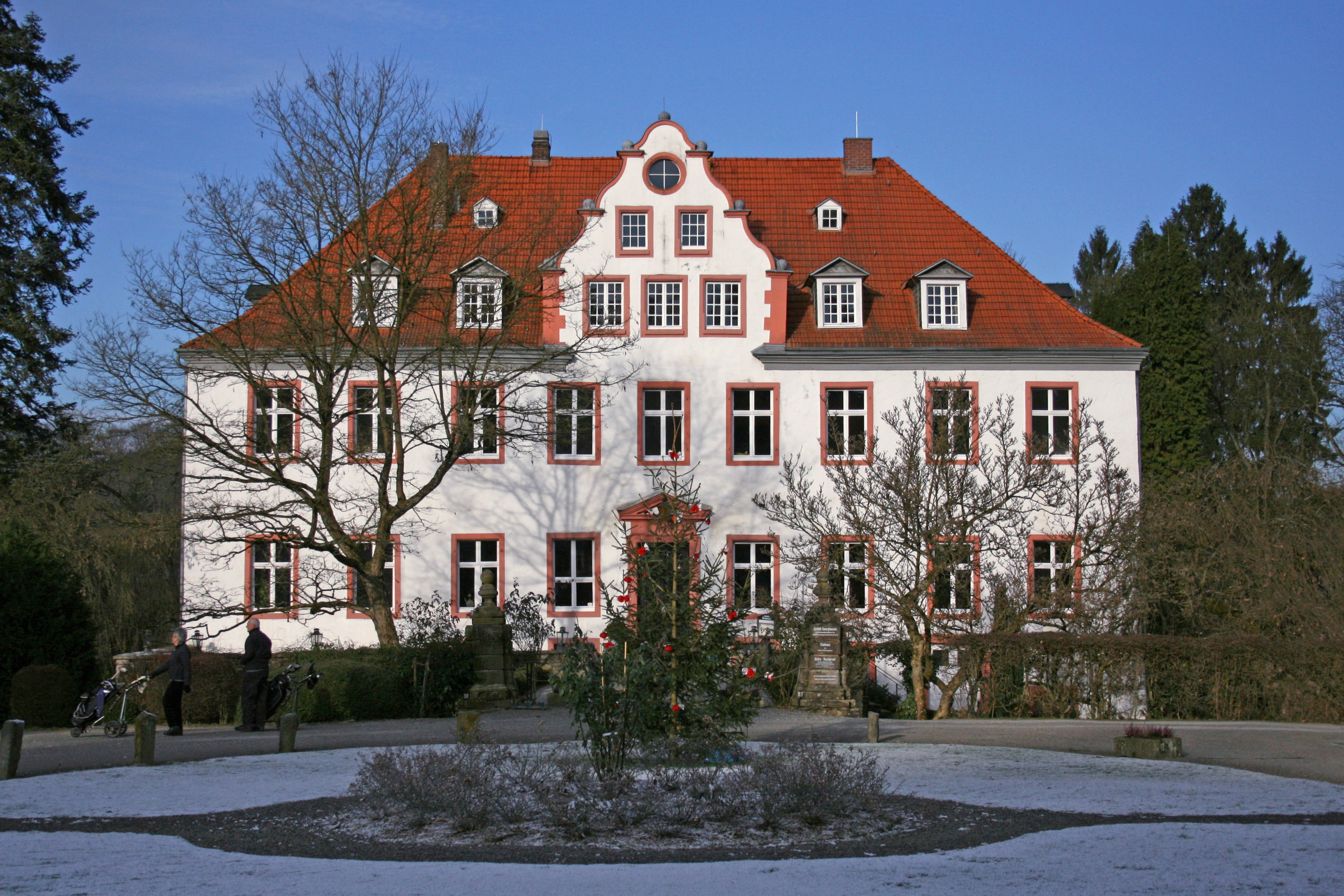
- Georghausen Castle

Site information
- Owner: Golf clubhouse
- Controlled by: Golf clubhouse
- Open to the public: Yes
- Condition: All parts receive

Location
- Coordinates: 50.993°N 7.2705°E
- Height: 193 m

Site history
- Built: 1466
- In use: Until
- Materials: Quarrystone

Georghausen Castle (German: Schloss Georghausen) is a moated castle in the district of Georghausen of the municipality of Lindlar, Oberbergischer Kreis in North Rhine-Westphalia (Germany).

== History ==
The castle Georghausen and a mill was first mentioned in a document in 1466. In 1490-1 a new drawbridge was built. In 1830 it was noted that the hamlet of Georghausen had a population of 56 inhabitants. Since 1951 the castle has served as a club house and restaurant.
