= Denklingen Castle =

- Near Denklingen Reichshof, Oberbergischer Kreis, North Rhine-Westphalia, Germany
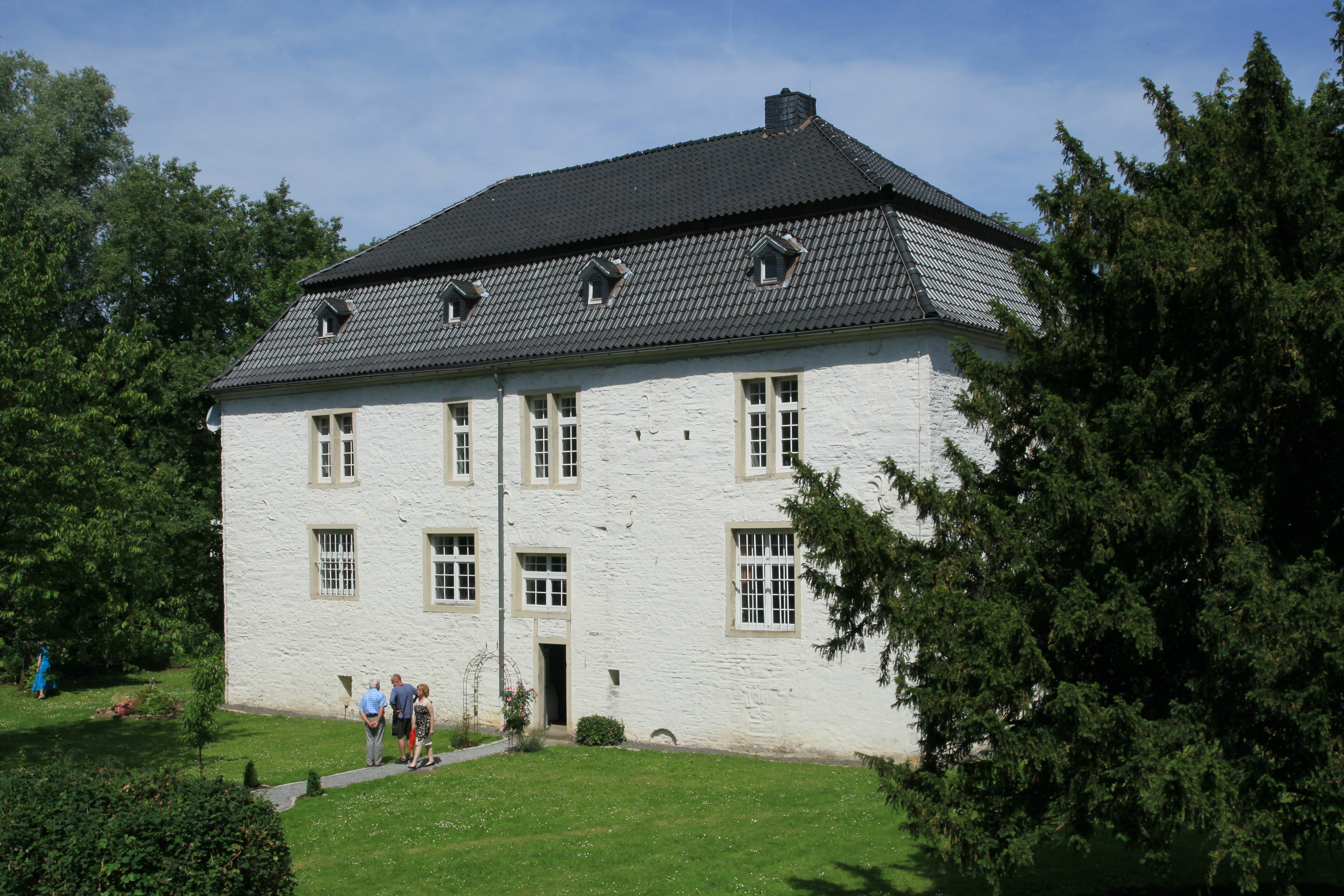
- The building in 2005.

Site information
- Owner: Municipality of Reichshof
- Open to the public: Yes
- Condition: Renovated in 1987

Location
- Coordinates: 50.91527°N 7.65516°E
- Height: 270 m

Site history
- Built: 14th century
- Built by: Count of Berg
- Materials: Quarrystone

Denklingen Castle is a historic building in the Denklingen district of Reichshof in the Oberbergischer Kreis of North Rhine-Westphalia, Germany.

== History ==
Originally Denklingen seems to have been the seat of the old Grafschaft Sayn court and there was already a castle on the site in the 14th century belonging to the Duke of Berg.

On 23 February 1413, Johann von Gimborn was granted possession of Denklingen for life by Duke Adolf of Berg together with the people of the parish Drolshagen. This tradition had its origin in the feudal system. Occupiers of fortified castles in the 14th century had certain obligations to their lord (castrum ligium). They could be called upon at any time to provide military assistance when the lord called for it.

On 24 August 1423, Engelbert von Scheidt, called Weschpfenning, was granted the fiefdom of the castle of Denklingen.

A document dated 1 September 1433, created when Duke Adolf formed an alliance with the landgrave Ludwig I of Hessen, directs that among other things Denklingen became an open house, "Unserem Slosse". On 29 November 1435 Duke Adolf pledged the castles of Windeck and Denklingen to his steward, Wilhelm von Nesselrode.

A document dated 6 December 1473, stated that Windeck and Denklingen had come under the ownership of the Ehrensteins.

Little is known about the history of the castle under bergischer management. This changes with the Siegburger treaty of 1604 which agreed a transfer of territories and people. On 2 December a ceremony when the new subjects declared their homage took place near Heisterstock bei Winterberg (Nümbrecht municipality) in the open air. The nobility of the new Berg lands were ordered on 11 March 1605 to take tribute to the castle at Denklingen and swear an oath of allegiance to the duke as lord.

The current building was originally a moated castle and dates from the 16th to the 18th century. In 1672 the management of the Windeck estates was moved to the castle. It was also called bursary office, because the steward officiated there.

In 1698, the 2-storey gate house was renovated. Nearby was a stone vault which had served earlier as a prison cell.

Restoration work at the castle was completed in 1987.

== Specific features today ==
- The castle is open to the public.
- A potter market is held in the castle court yearly at Pentecost.
- A wedding room is available for hire on the first floor.

== Sources ==
- Oswald Gerhard: Eckenhagen and Denklingen in the change of the times. A home history of the former imperial court area Eckenhagen. Ed. from the home association Eckenhagen inc., Eckenhagen in 1953.
