= Fair Rubber Association =

German non-governmental organization

The Fair Rubber Association (Fair Rubber e.V) is a non-governmental organization registered in Germany, which promotes the adoption of fair trade principles for products made of natural rubber, to improve the working and living conditions of the primary producers of natural rubber, such as tappers and small farmers.

== History ==
The first fair trade project for rubber was initiated in 2006 by FairDeal Trading Llp, a small British pioneer in fairly traded sports balls, who was trying to make their products more environmentally sustainable. With more than 60% of a standard soccer ball consisting of rubber, they sought suppliers willing to become partners in a fair trade rubber project. This attracted the attention of a condom manufacturer and a mattress manufacturer in Germany, who placed their products under the same fair trade conditions. As additional companies became interested, including a household gloves trader from the U.S., an independent organization was set up to run the fair trade project. This organization, the Fair Rubber Association, was founded on June 21, 2012. Since its founding, other traders and NGOs have joined.

== Criteria for fairly traded rubber ==
The criteria for fairly traded natural rubber are closely aligned to the criteria of the FairTrade Labelling Organization (FLO) International for tea. This is in part because in India and Sri Lanka, from where fairly traded natural rubber is sourced, tea and rubber plantations often belong to the same owners, and the workers are represented by the same trade unions. Additionally, Martin Kunz, the Executive Secretary of the Fair Rubber Association, had a central role in establishing the criteria for fair trade-labelled tea during his time as general secretary of TransFair International (TFI).

Fair Rubber Logo

At the center of this first fair trade-labelled product from plantations, was a fixed extra payment per kilogram of produce traded. This "fair trade premium" is paid into a separate bank account, and decision-making power for how the money is spent rests with a joint body made up of a committee of elected members of the workforce and management delegates. The fair trade premium may only be used for the improvement of the working and living conditions of the plantation employees. In the case of small farmer associations, the association's board that makes decisions regarding how the premium is spent. The fair trade premium paid by the members of the Fair Rubber Association is 0.50 EUR per kg of dry rubber content (DRC) on top of the market price of rubber. The Association's logo may be used on products for which this fair trade premium has been paid.

== Environmental considerations ==
The Fair Rubber Association argues that a key component of fair trade is to help make the environment safer for producers and consumers by promoting sustainability in products and production. Taking harmful chemicals out of farming is of benefit to the primary producers, and while natural rubber is not suitable for all applications, it is superior to synthetic rubbers in terms of environmental benefits. Synthetic or artificial rubber is a petroleum-based product which has the potential to contribute to climate change. Additionally, the trees from which natural rubber is tapped have such a high leaf density, that they absorb more carbon dioxide than the tropical rain forest.

== Organizational structure ==
The Fair Rubber Association is organized as a multi-stakeholder initiative seeking compromise between social, environmental, and commercial interests. The chair of the association is always someone who has no commercial interests in rubber.
