= Olpe (district) =

Coordinates: 51°05′N 8°00′E

- District
- Flag Coat of arms
- Country: Germany
- State: North Rhine-Westphalia
- Adm. region: Arnsberg
- Capital: Olpe

Government
  - District admin.: Theo Melcher (CDU)

Area
  - Total: 710.7 km^{2} (274.4 sq mi)

Population (31 December 2023)
  - Total: 132,426
  - Density: 190/km^{2} (480/sq mi)
- Time zone: UTC+01:00 (CET)
  - Summer (DST): UTC+02:00 (CEST)
- Vehicle registration: OE
- Website: www.kreis-olpe.de

Olpe (German pronunciation: [ˈɔlpə]) is a Kreis (district) in the south-east of North Rhine-Westphalia, Germany. Neighboring districts are Märkischer Kreis, Hochsauerland, Siegen-Wittgenstein, Altenkirchen, Oberbergischer Kreis.

== History ==
The district was created in 1817 as Kreis Bilstein, in 1819 the capital was set to be Olpe. During the reorganization of the districts in 1969 several of the municipalities in the district were merged to become cities, however the district itself was only modified minimally, and also in the second reorganization 1974 it stayed nearly in the same borders as in 1817.

== Geography ==
Geographically it covers the south-western part of the Sauerland mountains, which make the district rich in forests. The main river through the district is the Lenne.

== Schützenbund ==
The Kreisschützenbund Olpe performs the Kreisschützenfest.

== Coat of arms ==
The left half of the coat of arms show the cologne cross, as the Olpe area belonged to the bishops of Cologne. The right side show the sign of the Lords of Fürstenberg, who were governors for the bishops in this area.

== Towns and municipalities ==
Clickable map of towns and municipalities in the district

Towns
1. Attendorn
2. Drolshagen
3. Lennestadt
4. Olpe
Municipalities
1. Finnentrop
2. Kirchhundem
3. Wenden
