= Fritz Eschmann =

German politician (1909–1997)

Fritz Eschmann (born 7 June 1909 - 27 February 1997) was a German army officer and politician (SPD). He was a member of the German Bundestag.

== Early life and education ==
Born in Dieringhausen, Eschmann completed an apprenticeship as a locksmith in the Steinmüller boiler factory from 1923 to 1927 and then worked as a journeyman locksmith in Gummersbach until 1932. He then joined the police.

== Career ==
In 1936 he joined the Wehrmacht and was a professional soldier until 1945. In the Second World War he was an infantryman and was promoted to officer. He then served as a captain in the 5th Panzer Division (Wehrmacht). He was awarded the Iron Cross 1st and 2nd class and in August 1944 he received the Knight's Cross of the Iron Cross.

=== Politics ===
Eschmann was a member of the Oberberg District Council from 1948 to 1962 and from 1964 to 1969, and a member of the German Bundestag from 1953 to 1969. He represented the Oberbergischer Kreis constituency in Parliament. He was a member of the Defense Committee.

He died in Gummersbach.
