= Oberbergischer Kreis =

Coordinates: 51°02′N 7°31′E

- District
- Flag Coat of arms
- Country: Germany
- State: North Rhine-Westphalia
- Adm. region: Cologne
- Capital: Gummersbach

Government
  - District admin.: Jochen Hagt (CDU)

Area
  - Total: 918.53 km^{2} (354.65 sq mi)

Population (31 December 2024)
  - Total: 274,057
  - Density: 298.36/km^{2} (772.76/sq mi)
- Time zone: UTC+01:00 (CET)
  - Summer (DST): UTC+02:00 (CEST)
- Vehicle registration: GM
- Website: http://www.oberbergischer-kreis.de

The Oberbergischer Kreis (German pronunciation: [ˈoːbɐˌbɛʁɡɪʃɐ ˈkʁaɪs], lit. 'Upper Bergian District') is a Kreis (district) in the state of North Rhine-Westphalia, Germany. Neighboring districts are Ennepe-Ruhr, Märkischer Kreis, Olpe, Altenkirchen, Rhein-Sieg, Rheinisch-Bergischer Kreis, and the urban districts Remscheid and Wuppertal.

== Name ==
The district was named after the region known as Bergisches Land, which belonged to the County of Berg for most of the medieval era. What is called Oberbergisch ('upper Bergian') lies in the southeast of that earldom. By 1740, descriptions of the area distinguished between Niederbergisch, which was north of the river Wupper, and Oberbergisch to its south.

In 1816, after the entire Rhineland was annexed to Prussia, the districts of Waldbröl, Homburg, Gimborn, Wipperfürth, and Lennep were created within the area now covered by the district. In 1825 the districts Gimborn and Homburg were merged into the district Gummersbach. In 1932 it was merged with the district of Waldbröl, and the region became known as Oberbergischer Kreis. The restructuring of 1969/75 created the current boundaries of the district.

== Geography ==
The Oberbergischer Kreis covers the hills west of the Sauerland and north of the Westerwald. It constitutes the eastern part of the Bergisches Land nature reserve. Situated at an altitude of 100–520 meters above sea level, it is rich in wood and water (numbering ten artificial lakes) and thus a recreational area for citizens from Cologne, the Ruhr area and the Netherlands.

The prevailing rock is greywacke, which was and in places still is mined in large stone quarries.

== Coat of arms ==
The coat of arms is a combination of the heraldic signs of the territories the district belonged to. The red-white bar in the top symbolizes the County of Mark and the lion that of Berg. Homburg Castle (near Nümbrecht) was the seat of the Princes of Sayn-Wittgenstein-Berleburg.

== Politics ==
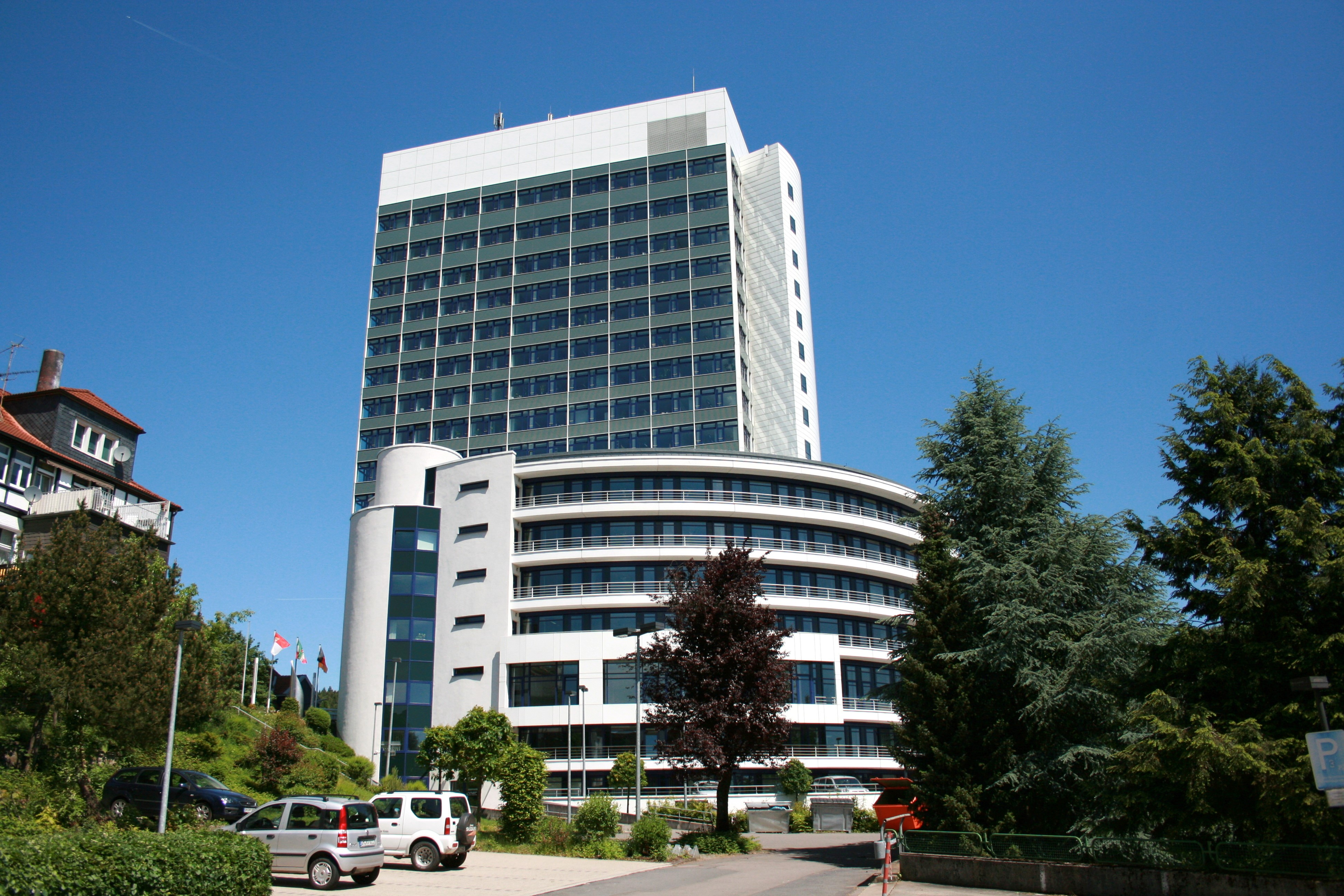
Gummersbach – Kreishaus 13 ies

=== Nazi era ===
Robert Ley, a Nazi politician who helped organize the recruitment of slave labor during World War II, and published an antisemitic newspaper, the Westdeutscher Beobachter, was born in Niederbreidenbach, a town in Oberbergischer Kreis.

=== District Administrator ===
- 1945–1951: August Dresbach, CDU
- 1951–1952: Fritz Eschmann, SPD
- 1952–1956: Wilhelm Henn, CDU
- 1956–1961: Fritz Eschmann, SPD
- 1961–1964: Reinhard Kaufmann, CDU
- 1964–1969: Heinrich Schild, CDU
- 1969–1989: Hans Wichelhaus, CDU
- 1989–1994: Hans-Leo Kausemann, CDU
- 1994–1999: Herbert Heidtman, SPD

Since the October 1st, 1999 there is only one (directly elected) District Administrator who at the same time is head of management:

- 1999–2004: Hans-Leo Kausemann, CDU
- 2004–2015: Hagen Jobi, CDU
- 2015–present: Jochen Hagt, CDU

=== District Administrator for the management ===
- 1946–1979: Friedrich-Wilhelm Goldenbogen, CDU
- 1979–1987: Dieter Fuchs, CDU
- 1987–1994: Gert Ammermann, CDU
- 1995–1999: Heribert Rohr, SPD

== Economy ==
The district's economy is marked by small and middle-sized industry, particularly in the areas of plastic and metal processing.

== Transport ==
The Oberbergischer Kreis district is connected via Autobahn A1, A4 and A45. A regional train connects the municipalities Engelskirchen, Gummersbach and Marienheide with Cologne and via Lüdenscheid with Hagen and Dortmund. The closest airports are Cologne Bonn, Düsseldorf and Dortmund.

== Places of interest ==
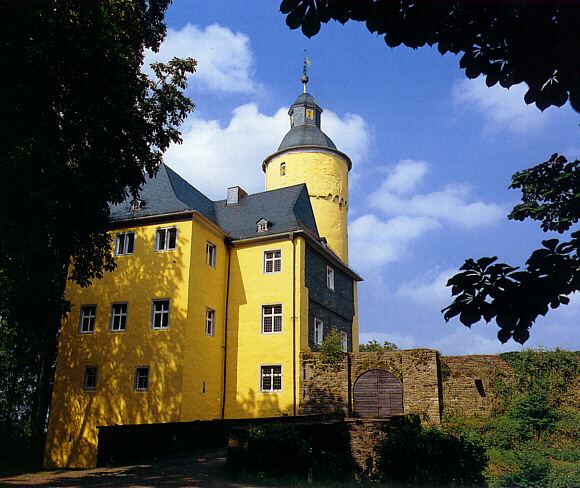
Homburg Castle

- The so-called "colored churches" (with medieval wall and cover paintings) are known nationally
- Stalactite cave in Wiehl
- Rhenish industry museum in Engelskirchen
- House Dahl
- Open-air museum in Lindlar
- Gimborn Castle
- Homburg Castle
- Hückeswagen Castle and the historical part of Hückeswagen
- Ehreshoven Castle
- Denklingen Castle

== Towns and municipalities ==
Clickable map of towns and municipalities in the district

Towns
1. Bergneustadt
2. Gummersbach
3. Hückeswagen
4. Radevormwald
5. Waldbröl
6. Wiehl
7. Wipperfürth
Municipalities
1. Engelskirchen
2. Lindlar
3. Marienheide
4. Morsbach
5. Nümbrecht
6. Reichshof
