= Gummersbach =

- Town
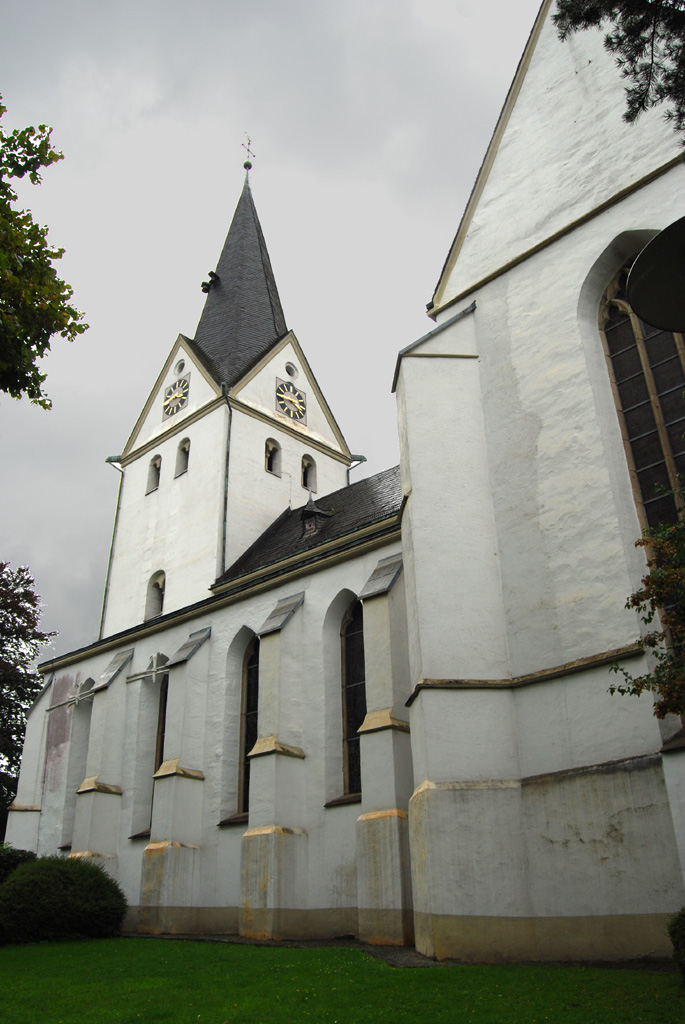
- Church in Gummersbach

- Coat of arms

- Location of Gummersbach within Oberbergischer Kreis district
- Interactive map of Gummersbach
- Location within Germany Location within North Rhine-Westphalia
- Coordinates: 51°02′N 7°34′E
- Country: Germany
- State: North Rhine-Westphalia
- Admin. region: Cologne
- District: Oberbergischer Kreis

Government
  - Mayor (2025–30): Raoul Halding-Hoppenheit (CDU)

Area
  - Total: 95.42 km^{2} (36.84 sq mi)
- Elevation: 154–519 m (505–1,703 ft)

Population (2025-12-31)
  - Total: 51,332
  - Density: 538.0/km^{2} (1,393/sq mi)
- Time zone: UTC+01:00 (CET)
  - Summer (DST): UTC+02:00 (CEST)
- Postal codes: 51643, 51645, 51647
- Dialling codes: 02261, small parts also: 02262, 02263, 02264, 02266, 02354, 02763
- Vehicle registration: GM
- Website: www.gummersbach.de

Gummersbach (German pronunciation: [ˈɡʊmɐsbax]) is a town in the state of North Rhine-Westphalia, Germany, being the district seat of the Oberbergischer Kreis. It is located 50 kilometres (31 mi) east of Cologne.

== History ==
In 1109 Gummersbach was mentioned in official documents for the first time. The document in question concerned the lowering of the episcopal tax for the church in Gummersbach by Archbishop Frederick I. At that time the name of the town was spelled as Gumeresbracht. In 1855 Gummersbach's industrial history began with the foundation of the company Steinmüller. With the company's success the little village began to grow to a town. Gummersbach received town privileges in 1857. For decades to come many inhabitants found work at Steinmüller. In 2002 the new parent company Babcock Borsig AG went out of business and so Steinmüller was shut down, too. After most of the premises were no longer in use, the town bought the property in order to develop it. The premises played a key role for the municipality, as it made up half of the downtown area by then. In the following years, among other things, an arena, a shopping mall and a new university campus were built.

== Population ==
Historical population

| Year | Pop. | ±% p.a. |
|---|---|---|
| 1965 | 46,869 | — |
| 1970 | 48,558 | +0.71% |
| 1975 | 49,315 | +0.31% |
| 1980 | 48,663 | −0.27% |
| 1985 | 48,375 | −0.12% |
| 1990 | 50,965 | +1.05% |
| 1995 | 53,149 | +0.84% |

| Year | Pop. | ±% p.a. |
|---|---|---|
| 2000 | 53,311 | +0.06% |
| 2005 | 53,048 | −0.10% |
| 2010 | 51,309 | −0.66% |
| 2015 | 50,412 | −0.35% |
| 2020 | 50,978 | +0.22% |
| 2025 | 51,332 | +0.14% |

Source: Landesdatabank Nordrhein-Westfalen

== Coat of arms ==
The arms were granted on July 27, 1892. Gummersbach developed rapidly from a small village to a large town during the early 19th century, due to the metal and textile industry. The right part of the arms thus show a spindle as a symbol for the textile industry. The left part shows the arms of the Counts of the Mark, as the area belonged to the Mark since 1287.

== Communities, localities and villages ==
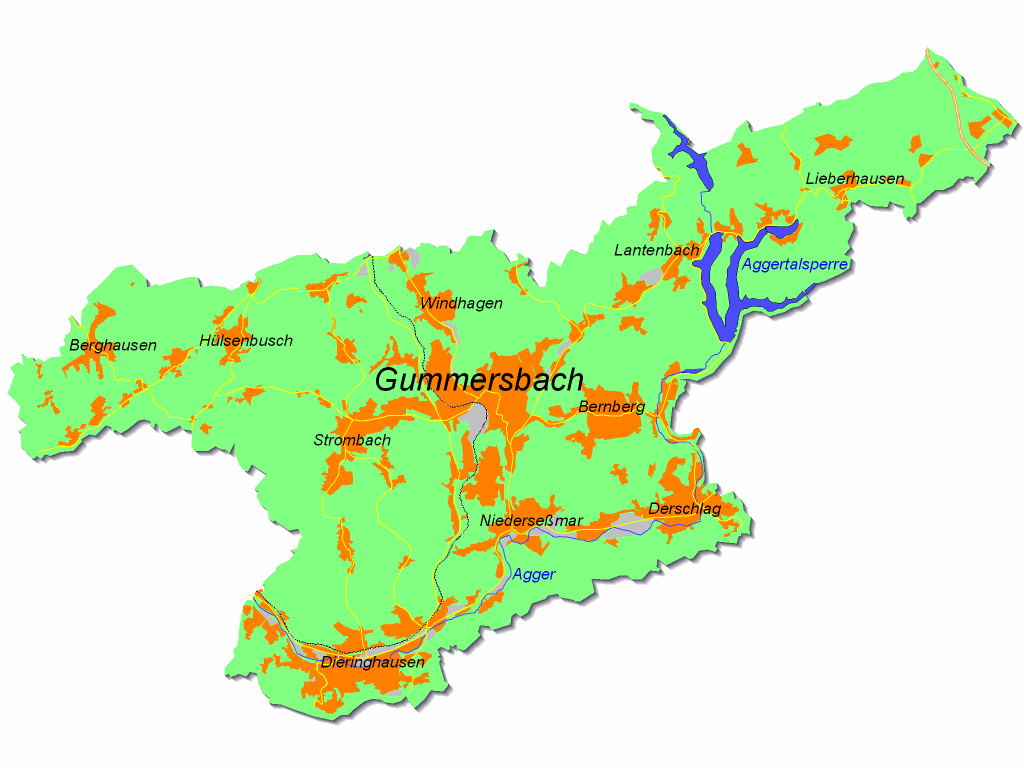
Map of Gummersbach

Apfelbaum – Becke – Berghausen – Bernberg – Birnbaum – Bracht – Bredenbruch – Brink – Bruch – Brunohl – Berghausen – Deitenbach – Derschlag – Dieringhausen – Drieberhausen – Dümmlinghausen – Elbach – Erbland – Erlenhagen – Flaberg – Frömmersbach – Grünenthal – Gummeroth – Hardt – Hardt-Hanfgarten – Helberg – Herreshagen – Hesselbach – Höfen – Hömel – Hülsenbusch – Hunstig – Kalkuhl – Karlskamp – Koverstein – Lantenbach – Lieberhausen – Liefenroth – Lobscheid – Lützinghausen – Luttersiefen – Mühle – Neuenhaus – Neuenschmiede – Niedergelpe – Niedernhagen – Niederseßmar – Nochen – Oberrengse – Ohmig -Peisel – Piene – Rebbelroth – Recklinghausen – Reininghausen – Remmelsohl – Rodt – Rospe – Schneppsiefen – Schönenberg – Schusterburg – Sonnenberg – Steinenbrück – Straße – Strombach – Unnenberg – Veste – Vollmerhausen – Waldesruh – Wasserfuhr – Windhagen – Wörde – Würden

== Main sights ==
- The Vogteihaus, former residence of the Vogt, built in 1700. It is also referred to as die Burg ("the castle"), and lies in the town center, on the Kaiserstraße.
- The Bunte Kerke ("colorful church") in the village Lieberhausen, a Protestant church with medieval wall paintings.
- The Protestant church of the village Hülsenbusch, rebuilt in the 18th century after a fire, in Baroque style.
- The Oberberg Cathedral (Oberbergischer Dom) in the town center
- The Agger Valley Dam

== Transport ==
Gummersbach is connected by regional trains to Cologne and Lüdenscheid, where a direct connection to Hagen and Dortmund exists. Trains heading towards Cologne run every 30 minutes and to Lüdenscheid every 60 minutes. Besides the station in downtown, there is another station in the neighborhood of Dieringhausen.

South of Gummersbach runs the A 4 motorway from Cologne to Olpe. In the north-east the A 45 motorway, which stretches from Dortmund to Frankfurt, connects to Gummersbach via the exit of Meinerzhagen.

== Education ==
- Communal elementary schools in the towncentre and the districts Becke, Bernberg, Derschlag, Dieringhausen, Hülsenbusch, Niederseßmar, Steinenbrück and Windhagen
- Jakob Moreno school, school for learning-disabled children
- Town secondary school Gummersbach-Hepel, http://www.rs-hepel.de/
- Town secondary school Gummersbach-Steinberg
- Town high school – Lindengymnasium, http://www.lindengymnasium.de/
- Occupational lecture Gummersbach
- Business school Gummersbach
- Cologne University of Applied Sciences, Faculty of Computer Science and Engineering Science, https://www.th-koeln.de/informatik-und-ingenieurwissenschaften/
- Educational center for technology and economy
- Music school Gummersbach e.V.
- Town comprehensive school, http://gesamtschulegm.de
- Waldorf School Oberberg, http://fws-oberberg.de

== Twin towns – sister cities ==
Gummersbach is twinned with:

- Afantou, Greece (2001)
- Burg, Germany (1990)
- La Roche-sur-Yon, France (1968)

== Sport ==
The men's team VfL Gummersbach was one of the most successful handball teams of Europe in the 1970s and 1980s. Overall it's the second most successful handball in German Handball-Bundesliga history.

== Notable people ==
- Heiner Brand (born 1952), former handball player and former coach of the handball national team
- Afu Thomas (Thomas Derksen), German internet celebrity in China
- Jürgen Domian, TV and radio show host
- Harald Fischer, doctor killed in Palestine on November 15, 2000
- Wolfgang Karius, conductor, organist, and harpsichordist
- Hella von Sinnen, TV personality
- Jan Sosniok, movie actor
- Adele Bloesch-Stöcker, Swiss-German violinist and composer
- Fritz Eschmann, former district administrator and member of the German parliament of SPD
- Jürgen Habermas (1929–2026), well known philosopher
- Rebekka Habermas (1959–2023), historian
- Moritz Neuhausen (born 2004), professional pool player
