= Reichshof =

- Municipality
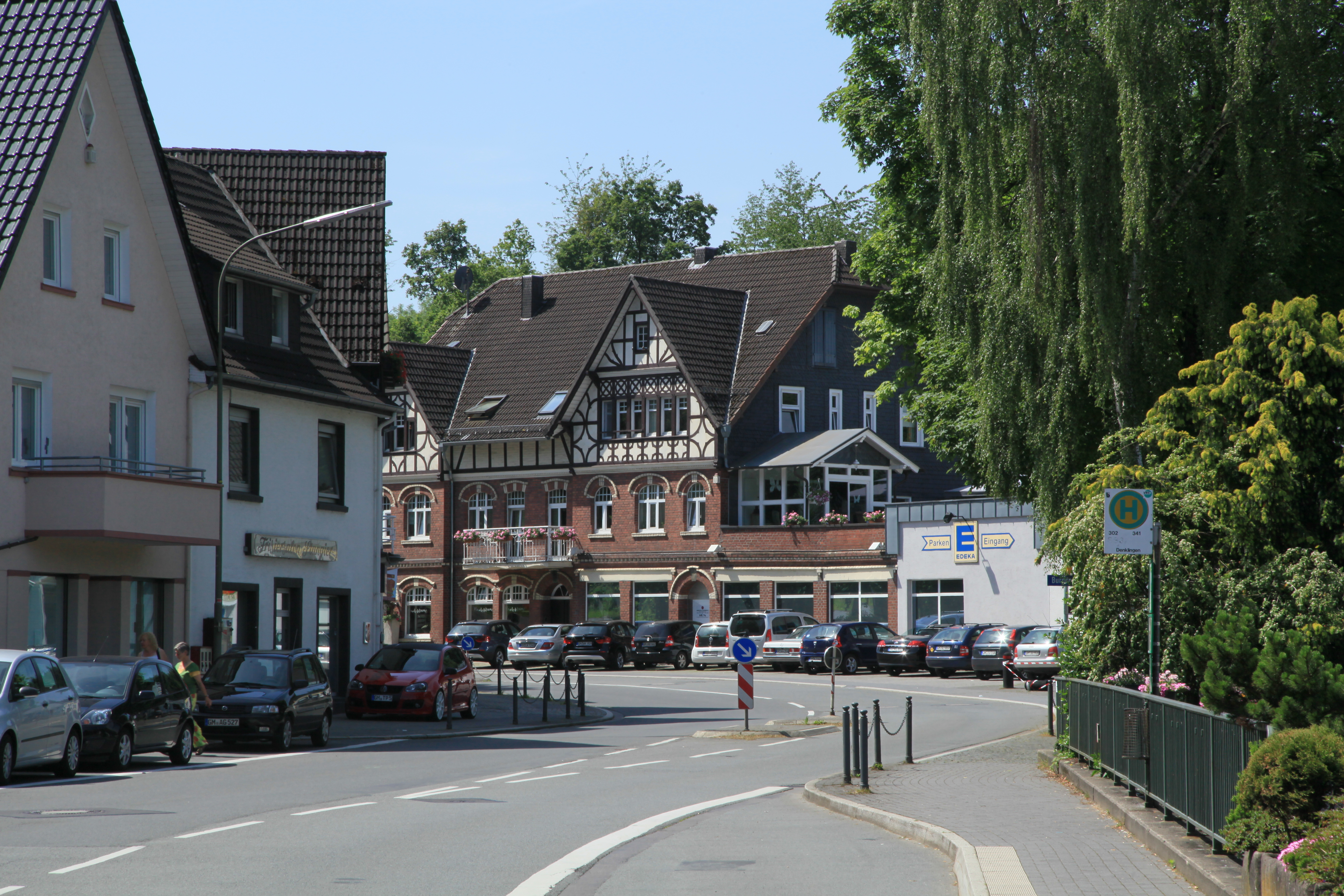

- Coat of arms

- Location of Reichshof within Oberbergischer Kreis district
- Interactive map of Reichshof
- Location within Germany Location within North Rhine-Westphalia
- Coordinates: 50°58′N 7°42′E
- Country: Germany
- State: North Rhine-Westphalia
- Admin. region: Köln
- District: Oberbergischer Kreis

Government
  - Mayor (2020–25): Rüdiger Gennies (CDU)

Area
  - Total: 114.66 km^{2} (44.27 sq mi)
- Elevation: 289–342 m (948–1,122 ft)

Population (2025-12-31)
  - Total: 18,509
  - Density: 161.43/km^{2} (418.09/sq mi)
- Time zone: UTC+01:00 (CET)
  - Summer (DST): UTC+02:00 (CEST)
- Postal codes: 51580
- Dialling codes: 02296, 02297, 02265, 02261
- Vehicle registration: GM
- Website: reichshof-online.de

Reichshof (German pronunciation: [ˈʁaɪçsˌhoːf]) is a North Rhine-Westphalian municipality in the Oberbergischer Kreis in Germany, about 40 km east of Cologne. It is a health resort, known for its good climate. The municipality consists of 106 villages and hamlets. The most important villages are Denklingen (population about 2000), Eckenhagen (1900), Brüchermühle (1700) and Wildbergerhütte (1600).

== History ==
While sources on the early history of the area are scarce, the name of the city suggests it was first founded during the reign of Charlemagne. It was first officially mentioned on August 1, 1167, when it was granted as a gift by Friedrich I (Barbarossa) to Archbishop Rainald of Cologne.

As a consequence of the municipal reorganization of 1969, the formerly independent municipalities Denklingen and Eckenhagen were consolidated into the municipality of Reichshof. The management of the municipality of Reichshof takes place in Denklingen.

== Population ==
Historical population

| Year | Pop. | ±% p.a. |
|---|---|---|
| 1965 | 14,344 | — |
| 1970 | 15,192 | +1.16% |
| 1975 | 15,238 | +0.06% |
| 1980 | 16,059 | +1.06% |
| 1985 | 15,926 | −0.17% |
| 1990 | 16,656 | +0.90% |
| 1995 | 18,385 | +1.99% |

| Year | Pop. | ±% p.a. |
|---|---|---|
| 2000 | 19,611 | +1.30% |
| 2005 | 20,174 | +0.57% |
| 2010 | 19,526 | −0.65% |
| 2015 | 18,837 | −0.72% |
| 2020 | 18,503 | −0.36% |
| 2025 | 18,509 | +0.01% |

Source: Landesdatabank Nordrhein-Westfalen

== Features of interest ==
The area has swimming pools and various sporting facilities (tennis, horse racing, shooting galleries, a gymnasium and a bicycle park). There are also several elementary schools.

The Denklingen Railway Bridge is a protected heritage site, part of the Wiehl Valley Railway (Wiehltalbahn). Various museums, churches and parks are open to visitors, along with historic mills and Denklingen Castle.

Companies in the new industrial area of Wehnrat include Ralf Bohle GmbH, producers of Schwalbe bicycle tires, SCEMTEC Transponder Technology GmbH, and Stahlbau GmbH (textiles).

== Twin towns ==
- Roden (since 2001 Noordenveld), Netherlands (since 1963)

== Notes ==
1. Originally counted as 107, the village of Nothausen is no longer included in the count due to having a population of 0 since 2008.
