= Viktor Kolář =

Czech photographer (born 1941)

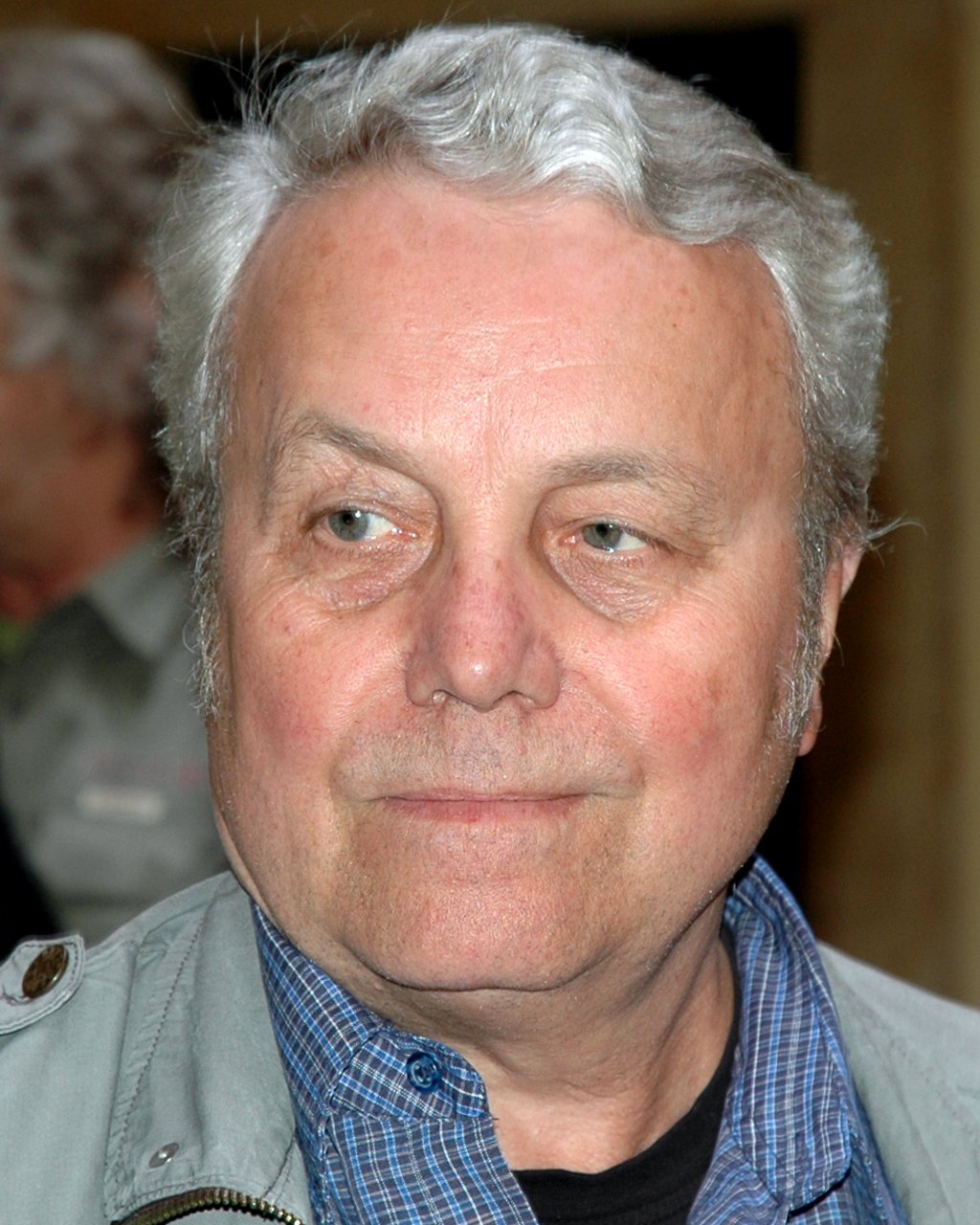
- Kolář in 2013
- Born: September 7, 1941 (age 84); Ostrava, Czechoslovakia
- Known for: Photography
- Style: Documentary photography
- Website: viktorkolar.com

Viktor Kolář (born 7 September 1941) is a Czech photographer. Along with Jindřich Štreit, Kolář is considered one of the most important exponents of Czech documentary photography. He mainly depicts urban life in the Ostrava region.

== Early life and education ==
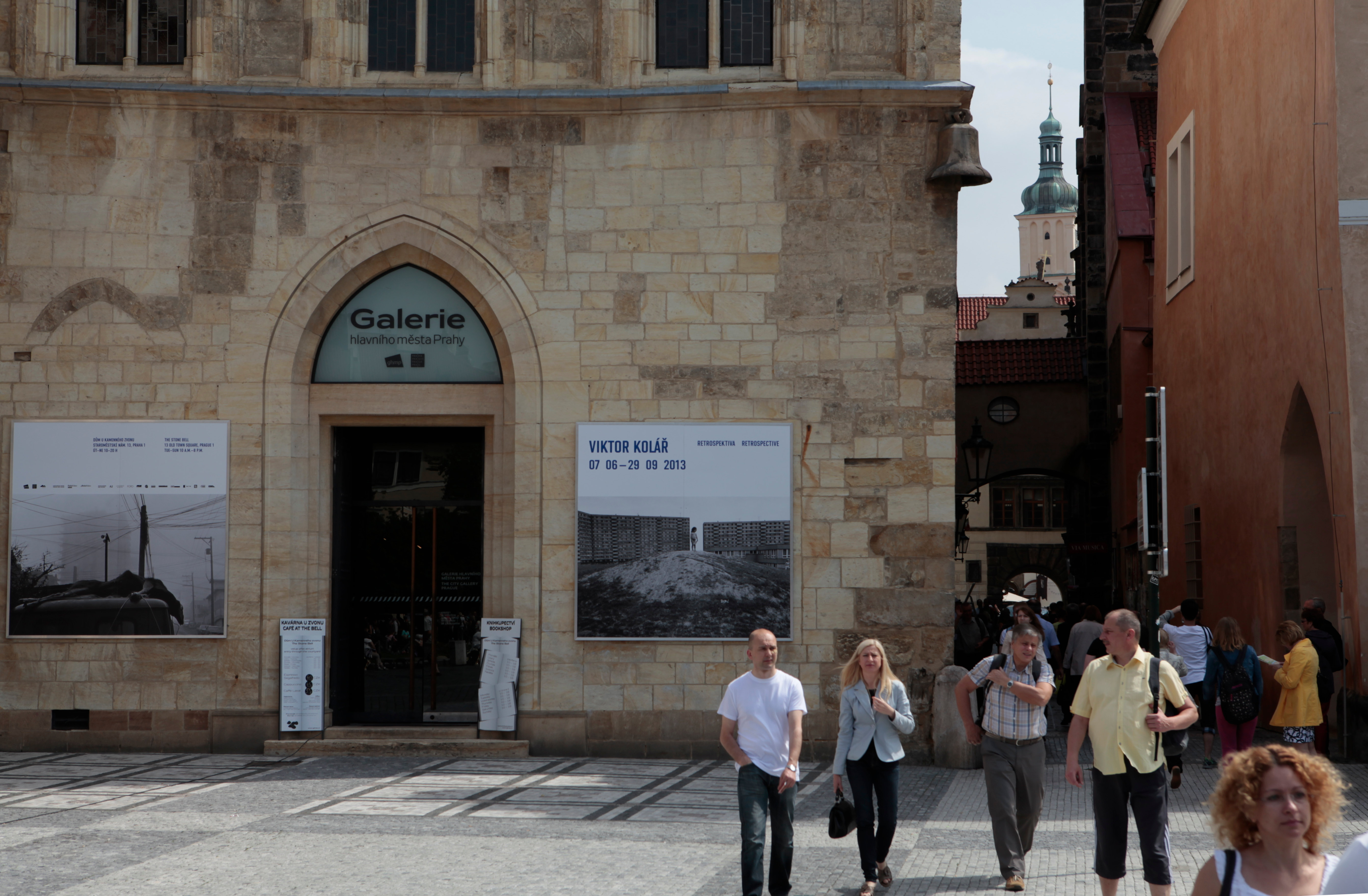
Viktor Kolář: Retrospective, an exhibition held at the Stone Bell House, Old Town Square, Prague in 2013

Kolář was born in 1941 in Ostrava, Czechoslovakia. His father was a documentary filmmaker and Ostrava’s principal photographer, owner of a photographic studio.

In 1953, Kolář began taking photographs, and studied the work of photographers including Henri Cartier-Bresson. From 1960 to 1964 he did teacher training at the Pedagogical Institute in Ostrava.

== Life and work ==
He then taught at an elementary school and from the mid 1960s was devoted to photography. In 1967, he befriended the photography theorist Anna Fárová and her husband, painter Libor Fára. In 1964, Kolář held his first solo exhibition.

In October 1968, after the Warsaw Pact invasion of Czechoslovakia, Kolář emigrated to Canada, working in the molybdenum mines and in the nickel smelters in Manitoba. Moving into photography, from 1971 to 1973, he documented shopping malls in Montreal, exhibiting the work in the Optica Gallery, Montreal.

In 1973, Kolář moved back to Czechoslovakia, via Paris and London. As a former emigrant, he was interrogated by police on several occasions and, distrusted by the state, was eventually unable to work as a photographer. Instead, during that period of "normalization", he worked as a laborer in Nová Huť steelworks, while covertly documenting the Ostrava Region with his camera. From 1975 to 1984, he worked as a stage technician at the Petr Bezruč Theatre. In 1985, Kolář again worked as a freelance photographer and in 1991 won the Mother Jones International Photography Award.

Vladimír Birgus and Jan Mlčoch write that from as early as the late 1960s:

[Kolář] was often uncompromising in revealing the depreciation of ethical values, shallowness, and alcohol-induced merriment of the pub, and yet he was poetical in discovering extraordinary moments of everyday life.

They add that his ability to create works allowing for a variety of interpretations makes him "one of the first Czech photographers closer to Robert Frank than to the humanistic photojournalists of Magnum or Life magazine so generally admired and imitated".

After his return from Canada to Czechoslovakia, however, he moved away from social documentary and sociological approaches, instead moving to more subjective work, with unusual compositions, raising questions as:

he searches in crowd scenes for the most precise photographic expression of his themes, including people's orientation in life, frustration, atrophy of the emotions and of faith, the relationship between the individual and the social system, and the adoration of consumerism.

In 1994, after the Velvet Revolution, Kolář began to teach documentary photography at FAMU in Prague, where he was appointed associate professor in 2000. He also travelled and lectured across the USA.

== Publications ==
- Daniela Mrázková. Viktor Kolář. Ostrava: Profil, 1986. OCLC 18245947. Text in Czech, with summaries in English, German and Russian.
- Viktor Kolář. Baník Ostrava. West Berlin: Ex-Pose, 1986. OCLC 18151558. Text in Czech, German and English.
- Ladislav Brumek, ed. Divadlo Jiřího Myrona: Ostrava 1986. Opava: Okresní stavební podnik, [1987]. OCLC 39415248. About the 1986 reconstruction and reopening of the Jiří Myron Theatre. In Czech, with summaries in German, Russian and Spanish. Photographs by Viktor Kolář, František Krasl, Petr Sikula, and others.
- Viktor Kolář. Baník Ostrava: Menschen zwischen Stahl und Kohle. Dortmund: Hoesch AG, 1992. OCLC 31243344. With 22 plates, a preface by Kolář, and an essay by Karl-Peter Ellerbrock. All texts in German only.
- Viktor Kolář. Malá Strana. Prague: Köcher & Köcher, 1993. OCLC 755098953. Text in Czech, German, English and French.
- Viktor Kolář; texts by Richard Svoboda, Peter Zajac, and Jaroslav Žila. Ostrava-obležené město. Ostrava: Sfinga, 1995. ISBN 80-7188-016-7. Texts in Czech, and partly in Slovak, English, French and German.
- Viktor Kolář. Seminář o fotografickém dokumentu. Prague: Film and TV School of the Academy of Performing Arts in Prague, 2000. ISBN 9788085883534.
- Viktor Kolář. Seminar in documentary photography. Prague: Academy of Performing Arts, 2000. ISBN 9788085883565.
- Jiří Cieslar. Viktor Kolář. Fototorst 9. Prague: Torst, 2002. ISBN 80-7215-159-2.
- Kate Bush and Mark Sladen, eds. In the face of history: European photographers in the 20th century. London: Black Dog, 2006. ISBN 978-1-904772-57-6. Photographs by Kolář on pp. 146–155. Via the Internet Archive.
- Lara Moreno and Pilar Sánchez, eds. Años 70: fotografía y vida cotidiana. Madrid: La Fábrica, 2009. ISBN 978-84-92498-76-5. Photographs by Kolář on pp. 78–89. Via the Internet Archive.
- Viktor Kolář, et al. Ostrava. Prague: Kant, 2010. ISBN 978-80-7437-030-4. Text in Czech and English.
- Viktor Kolář, et al. Canada, 1968–1973. Prague: Kant, 2013. ISBN 978-80-7437-103-5. Eighty-two plates (61 of these of photographs taken either in Toronto or Montreal, 15 elsewhere in Canada, and six in the US). With an interview of Kolář by Karel Hvížďala and a preface ("Figure and place") by Marek Pokorný, all in both Czech and English.
- Viktor Kolář and Roland Angst. Viktor Kolář: Human. Berlin: Only Photography, 2015. ISBN 978-3-9816885-3-5. Edition of 300 copies. Sixty-one plates, taken 1963–2004 in Ostrava. With an interview of Kolář by Roland Angst, in English.

== Collections ==
Kolář's work is held in the following permanent collections:

- Moravian Gallery, Brno. Numerous prints.
- Museum of Decorative Arts, Prague
- Gallery of Fine Arts, Ostrava
- Maison Européenne de la Photographie, Paris.
- Photo Élysée, Lausanne.
- Museum Ludwig, Cologne
- Victoria and Albert Museum, London. One print.
- Art Institute of Chicago, Chicago. Six prints.
- Museum of Fine Arts, Houston. Three prints.
- National Gallery of Canada, Ottawa, Canada. 15 prints.
- National Film Board of Canada.
- Yale University Art Gallery. Three prints.

== Solo exhibitions ==
- Fotografie Viktora Koláře, Černá louka, Ostrava, 1964
- Viktor Kolar's Czech Eye, Optica Gallery, Montreal, 1973
- Člověk mezi lidmi, Fotochema, Ostrava, 1976
- Ostrava, Fotochema, Ostrava, 1978
- Viktor Kolář. Ostrava – fotografie z let 1968–1980, House of Arts, Brno, 12 December 1980 – 11 January 1981
- Novosvětská setkání, Galerie pod Podloubím, Olomouc, 1981
- Ostrava, Malá výstavní síň, Liberec, 1981
- Novosvětská setkání, Galéria F, Banská Bystrica, 1981
- Ostrava, Ústav makromolekulární chemie Akademie věd České republiky, Prague, 1981
- Novosvětská setkání, Fotochema, Ostrava, 1981
- Ostrava, Canon Gallery, Amsterdam, 1981
- Viktor Kolář, Fotografijos Galeria, Kaunas, 1981
- Viktor Kolář – fotografie, Muzeum Stillonu, Gorzów Wielkopolski, 1981
- Viktor Kolář: Fotografie, Ústav makromolekulární chemie (Galerie Makráč), Prague, 13–23 September 1982
- Viktor Kolář – fotografie, Realistické divadlo, Prague, 1987
- Viktor Kolář: 13 let, Galerie 4, Cheb, 29 March – 21 April 1988
- Viktor Kolář: Ostrava, Žďár nad Sázavou, 25 August – 10 September 1989
- Viktor Kolář, House of Photography (Pražský dům fotografie), Prague, 6 June – 14 July 1991
- Viktor Kolář, Robert Koch Gallery, San Francisco, – 31 January 1991
- Viktor Kolář – Schwarzes Ostrava, Palais Jalta, Frankfurt am Main, 1991
- Baník Ostrava, Hoesch Museum, Dortmund, 12 May – 3 July 1992
- Viktor Kolář: Nevinné oko, Ostravské muzeum, Ostrava, 1993 (3 March –)
- Baník Ostrava, Baumwollspinnerei Ermen & Engels, LVR Industrial Museum, Engelskirchen, 1993
- Viktor Kolář: Menschen zwischen Stal und Kohle, Landschaftsverband Rheinland – Rheinisches Industriemuseum, Meckenheim, 13 June 1993 – 7 August 1993
- Viktor Kolář, Slovenský rozhlas, Slovak Radio Building, Bratislava, 1994
- Viktor Kolář – 40 fotografií / 40 photographs, Americké kulturní středisko, Prague, 4 April – 12 May 1995
- Viktor Kolář – fotografie, House of Arts, Brno, 23 January – 25 February 1996
- Viktor Kolář: Vročení let 1965–95, Silesian Museum, Opava, 21 March – 17 April 1996
- Viktor Kolář, Helsingør Custom House (Toldkammeret), Helsingør, 1996
- Viktor Kolář: Ostrava, Biennale of International Photography, Photographic Centre, Skopelos, 28 June – 20 August 1996
- Viktor Kolář – Ostrava, The Photographic Center, Athens, 1997
- Viktor Kolář, Fotografie 1967–1997, Václav Špála Gallery, Prague, 6 November – 7 December 1997
- Viktor Kolar: Figures de la solitude, Musée de l'Élysée, Lausanne, 12 November 1998 – 17 January 1999
- Viktor Kolář, Czech Centre, Berlin, (Czech Centres), 1999
- Viktor Kolář, Fotografie / Photographs Ostrava 1963–1999, Gallery of Fine Arts, Ostrava, 22 September – 24 October 1999
- Viktor Kolář Photographs – Czech Photography II, Leica Gallery, New York City, 2002
- Malá Strana (Prague) photographs of Viktor Kolář, Blue Sky Gallery, Portland, Oregon, 7–30 March, 2002
- Na ostro (50 fotografií Viktora Koláře 1989–2003), Muzeum Boskovicka, Boskovice, 17–20 July 2003
- Viktor Kolar Photographs, World of Glass, St Helens, 2007
- Město budoucnosti = The town of future, Galerie u Rytíře, Liberec, 14 May – 12 July 2008
- Retrospektywa/Retrospective of VK, Gallery A, Starmach, Kraków, 2009
- Moravian Gallery, Brno, 11 March – 5 June, 2011
- Viktor Kolář: Retrospektiva = Viktor Kolář: Retrospektiva, Stone Bell House, Prague, 7 June – 29 September 2013
- Viktor Kolář. Fotografien = Viktor Kolář. Photographs, Sprengel Museum, Hannover. 25 February – 31 May 2015
- Human, Only Photography, Berlin, 28 March – 31 May, 2015
- Viktor Kolář: Canada 1968–73, Galerie Jiřího Jílka, Šumperk, 6–31 May 2015
- Viktor Kolář: Ostrava, Nicolas Krupp Gallery, Basel, 5 September – 31 October 2015
- Viktor Kolář: 2000 + 15 / Barevně, AP Ateliér (Josef Pleskot), Prague, 11 December 2015 – 20 May 2016
- Visions of Viktor Kolář, The Lumiere Brothers Center for Photography, Moscow, 15 June – 25 September, 2016
- Viktor Kolář: Canada, 1968–1973, Stephen Bulger Gallery, Toronto, 21 January – 18 February 2017
- Viktor Kolár: Photographs, Norma Mangione, Turin, 3 May – 28 July 2018
- Viktor Kolar: Colors of Ostrava, Norma Mangione, Turin, 16 January – 11 April 2020
- Viktor Kolář: Součastnost 1989–2022. 400 ASA Gallery, Smíchov, Prague, 22 April – 24 June 2022
- Viktor Kolář, Fronta na kupónové knížky (Výstava jednoho díla ze sbírek GVUO) = Queuing for coupon booklets: Exhibition of a single work, Gallery of Fine Arts, Ostrava, 7 March – 4 June 2023
