= Suzanne Pastor =

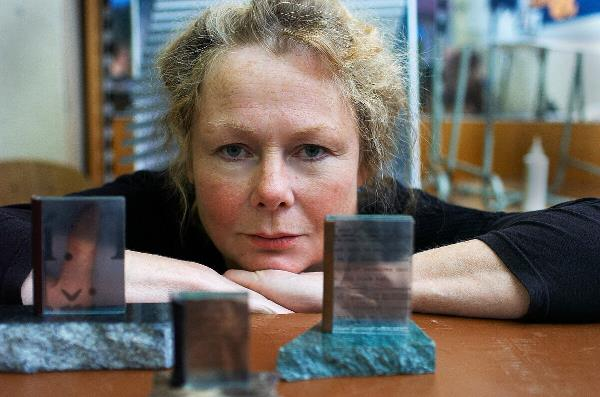
- Born: November 16, 1952 (age 74); Chicago, Illinois, U.S.
- Education: Northwestern University, Art Institute of Chicago, University of Kassel
- Known for: Photography
- Notable work: Glass books, photo-based 3-D works, photography
- Website: www.suzannepastor.com

Suzanne Pastor (born 16 November 1952, Chicago, United States) is an artist of German-American descent based in Prague, Czech Republic. She is known for her three-dimensional approach to photography, especially her glass book sculptures that explore text-image combinations, layering of memory and sequencing. Photographs of understated poetic surrealist nature have been hand-colored, ripped, layered, folded, nailed, or combined with fragments from 19th-century photographs, text fragments or other objects.

== Early life ==
Born in Oak Park, Illinois shortly after her parents emigrated to the USA from post-war Germany, grew up in the Chicago area, played violin and flute; drawing, painting and photography from age 11. Parents were both chemists; two siblings, a younger brother and older sister.

=== Education ===
Northwestern University (1970–75): humanities study with psychology major; courses at Harvard and Cornell universities; work and study at Art Institute of Chicago, where she took her first course in photography under Kenneth Josephson.

George Eastman House (1978–81): in Rochester, NY, organized auction of contemporary photography, directed traveling exhibitions program and picture research.

== Europe ==
University of Kassel (Hochschule für Bildende Kunst GHK Universität - Kassel), Germany (1981-1984): study under Floris Neususs, Klaus Honnef. Worked at renowned Rudolf Kicken Gallery, Cologne (1981-1985), organizing and preparing exhibitions and catalogues (Czech and European modernist photography), portfolio editions, translations, editing; travelled for research of Bauhaus, art fairs and sales to private collectors and museums.

Prague House of Photography (1990-1999): Pastor moved from Germany, where she lived for 10 years, to Prague to become co-founder and first curatorial director of Prague House of Photography (now GHMP), a non-profit independent gallery, where she organized exhibitions of Jaroslav Rossler, Jaromir Funke, Frantisek Drtikol, Vaclav Zykmund, August Sander, Eva Fuka, Barbara Crane, Jindrich Streit, Viktor Kolar, and others, introducing an international program to post-Velvet Revolution Czechoslovakia while promoting Czech contemporary photography there and abroad.

Pastor has conducted workshops (Photography in the Third Dimension) in the Czech Republic, Slovakia, Poland, Germany, the Netherlands. She has translated and written numerous texts and lectured on Bauhaus and photography, German modernist photography, feminist and Czech avant-garde photography, and is also a collector of Czech photography and photography books.

== Works ==
Major series include Hand-colored still-lifes, Body still-lifes, Jugendstil Album, The Address Book, Glass Books, Fragments from the Sex Life of Jan S. and Valkyrie (hair), also photograms and short videos. Her idiosyncratic approach to photography has been influenced by her work with museums and galleries, specifically the use of materials related to the “packaging” and presentation of photography as a commodity, involving glass, mat-board, nails, frames, surgical tape, texts and finally, the museum wall as final resting place for the framed photograph as object.

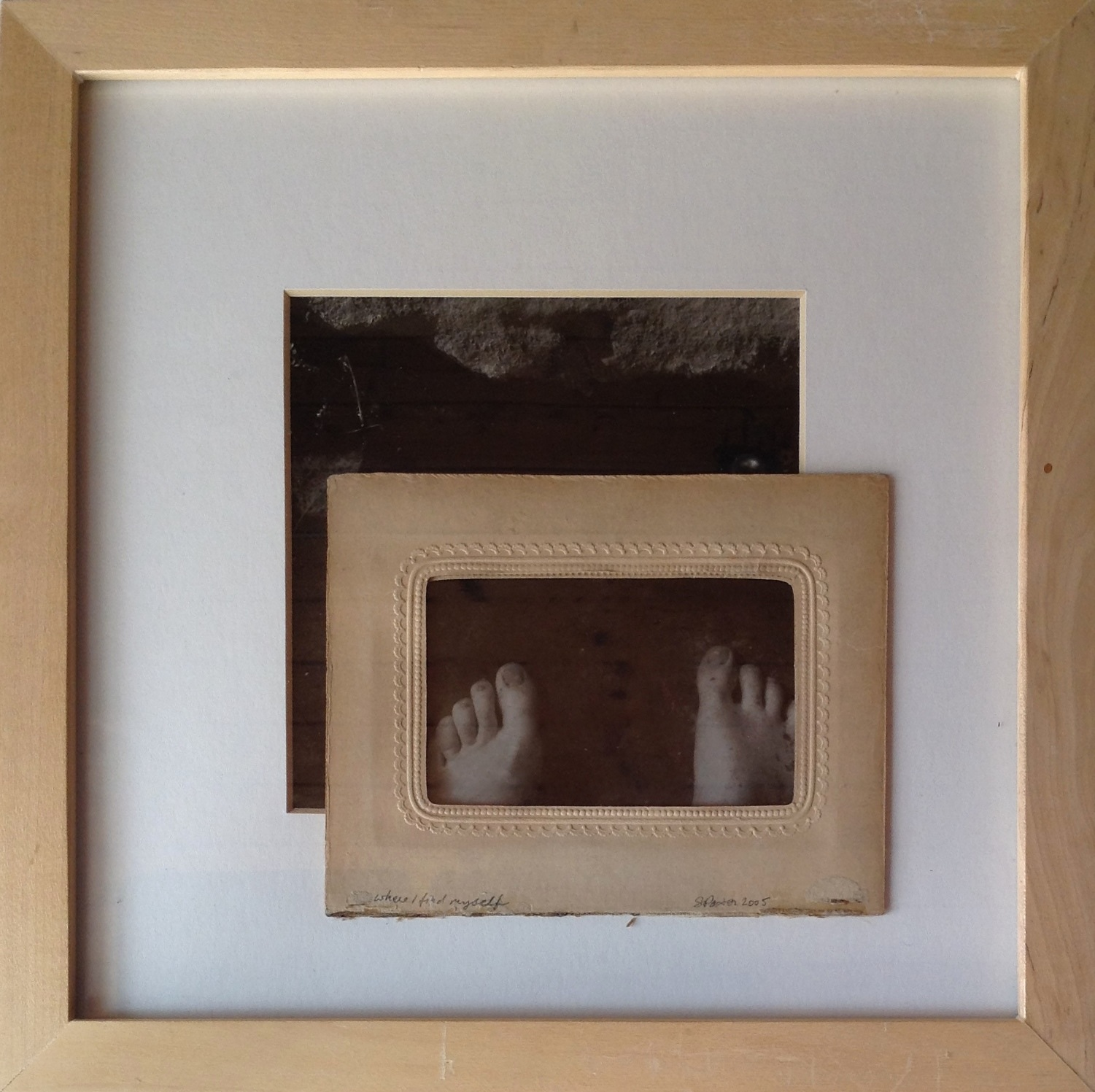
Suzanne Pastor, Where I find myself, 2002

Her use of the book form (see Glass books, Address book, Jugendstil album) reflects a persistent fascination/obsession with multiple layering - of imagery with texts from art history, psychology, poetry, memory - and with language itself, including digital gibberish derived from incompatible forms of computer fonts and symbols. Recent work includes photograms on outdated Hungarian Forte paper of the ubiquitous Central European dumpling/knedlik.

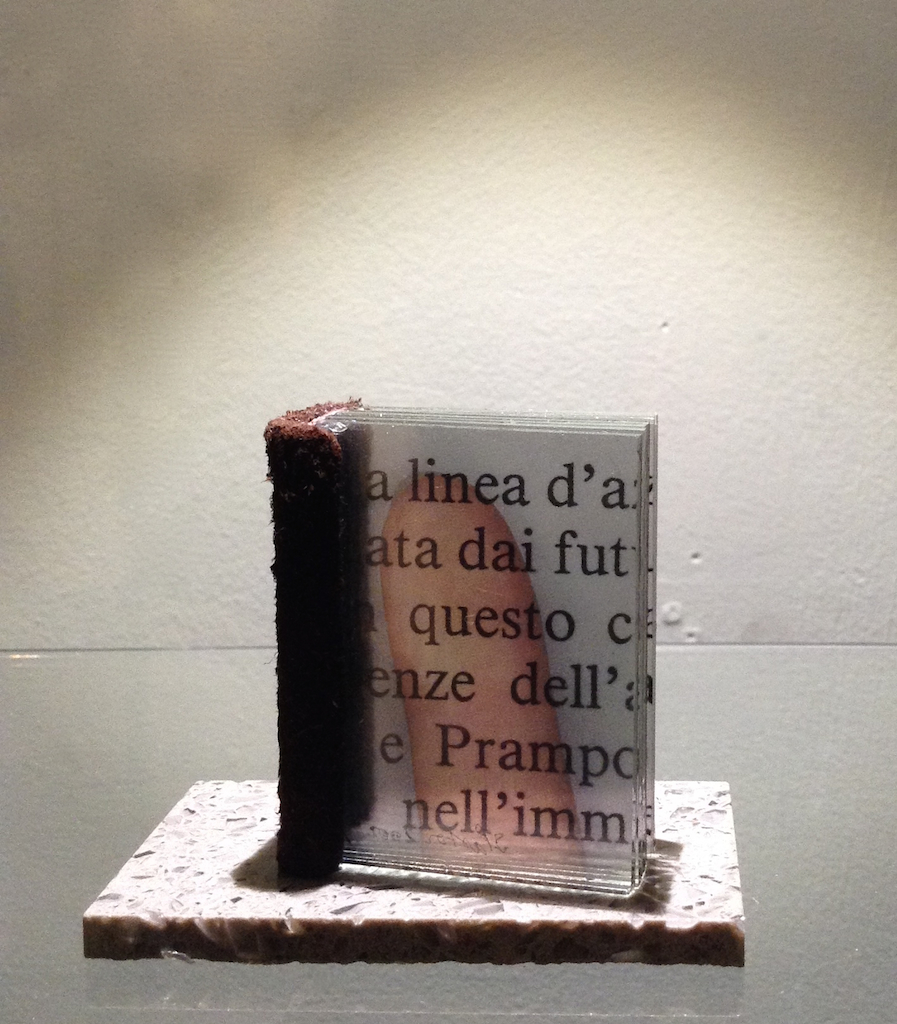
5 x 3.7 x 1.5 cm. Glass, brown leather binding, text fragment folie.

I possess at the very least - curiosity - a need to experiment with, to enhance the two dimensionality of the photographic print… Using sequential images, as ina book form, is an enormously powerful tool… Layering of time and space in three-dimensional assemblages provides additional freedom of form and material, most useful for the would-be sculptor…[S. Pastor, Prague, 2008]

Her conceptual approach may be compared to the concrete poetry or collage work of Jiri Kolar, the object assemblages/boxes of Joseph Cornell, new forms of pop culture stemming from the work of Andy Warhol, and post-modernism in her work incorporating historical imagery with object or text fragments from the modern, everyday world.

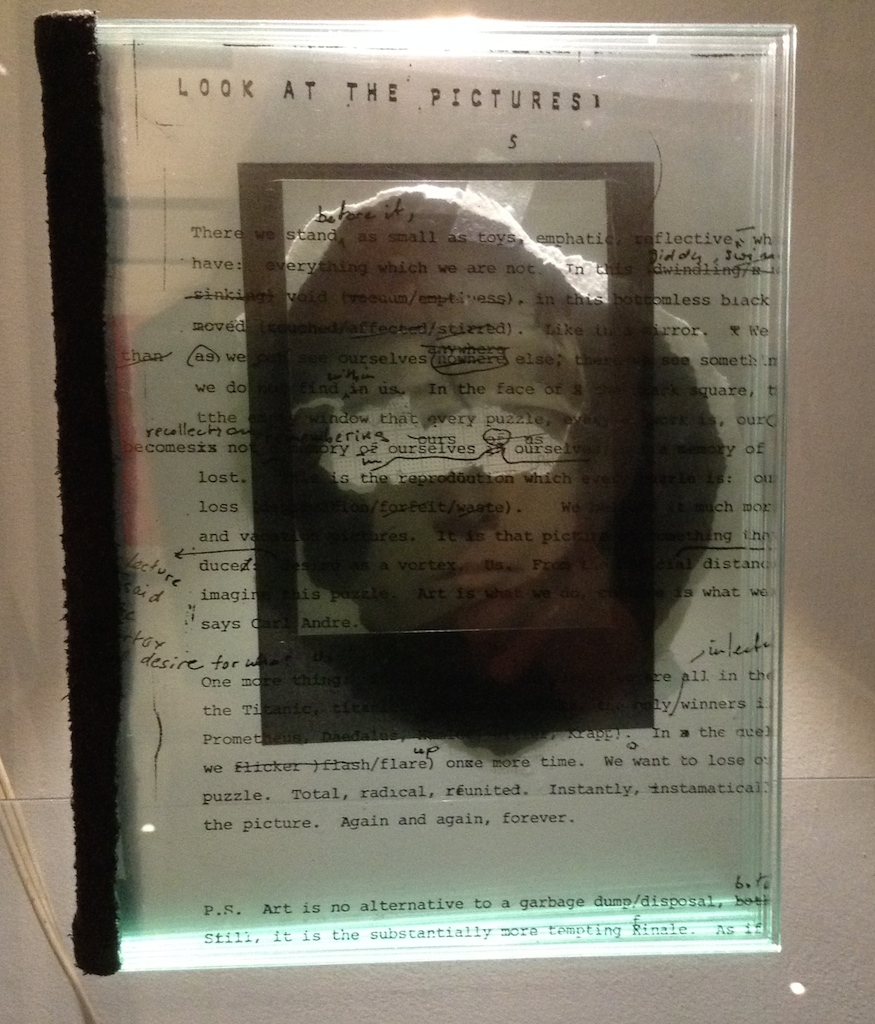
Suzanne Pastor, Glass book, 2002

=== Videos ===
- Lea in the Womb, Suzanne Pastor, 2007 (Prague)
- Made in Finland, Maybe Baby Union, 2007
- Fake Dance, Maybe Baby Union, 2014
- Ceska televize/Czech Television, 2017

=== Exhibitions ===
Important exhibitions include Arles, Bonn (1981), Frankfurt, NYC (1984), Stuttgart (1985), Amsterdam (1988), Cheb, Brno, Klatovy, Enschede (1998), Israel, Prague, Sobotka, Frankfurt (1999), Prague (2001), New York City, Olomouc, Bruntal, Chicago Art, Art Frankfurt (2002), Jihlava (2004), Prague (2006, 2007, 2010), NYC/Seville, Spain/Beijing, China (2009-2010), Angers, France (2009), Nurnberg (2010), Weiden (2011), Prague (2013), Berlin (2013), Arles (2014), Rome (2015), Prague, 2017, 2018

=== Collections ===
Her work is in the collections of the Museum Ludwig, Cologne; Berlinische Galerie; Brooklyn Museum of Art; Charles University, Prague; Folkwang Museum, Essen; Museum of Decorative Arts, PragueMetropolitan Museum of Art, NY; Myslbek Palace, Prague; Moravian Gallery in Brno; Musée Réattu, Arles; Eli Lemberger Museum of Photography, Israel; Museum of Contemporary Photography, Chicago; South African National Gallery, Cape Town; National Museum of Photography, Jindrichuv Hradec; Joan Flasch Special Collection, School of the Art Institute of Chicago; Bratislava FotoFest; Polaroid Corporation Europe, Yale University Art Gallery and numerous private collections.

She won first prize at Bratislava Fotofestival for Best Artist’s Book 2000 in Central and Eastern Europe.

- Biography
- "Bauhaus fotografie," Rudolf Kicken and Suzanne Pastor, ed., with essay by Els Barents. 1982. Galerie Rudolf Kicken, Cologne
- "Photography and the Bauhaus," Suzanne Pastor. The Archive, nr. 21. Center for Creative Photography, University of Arizona. Tucson. 1985
- "Bauhaus und Fotografie," Karl Haenlein, Gerhard Gluher, Suzanne Pastor. Kestner-Gesellschaft. Hannover. 1986, ISBN 9789800029114
- Suzanne Pastor, "Glass Books and Other Things, Odephil Editions Prague 1999, ISBN 9788090255715
- Suzanne Pastor and Gunther Dietrich, "Czech Fundamental" (exhibition catalog: Berlin, Museo di Roma).
- Suzanne Pastor, "Fotografie v treti dimenzi," Fotografika Galerie Fiducia. With essays by Nadia Rovderova and Dr. Michal Tosner. Ostrava. 2017
