= Müller Cloth Mill =

Coordinates: 50°38′58″N 6°49′28″E

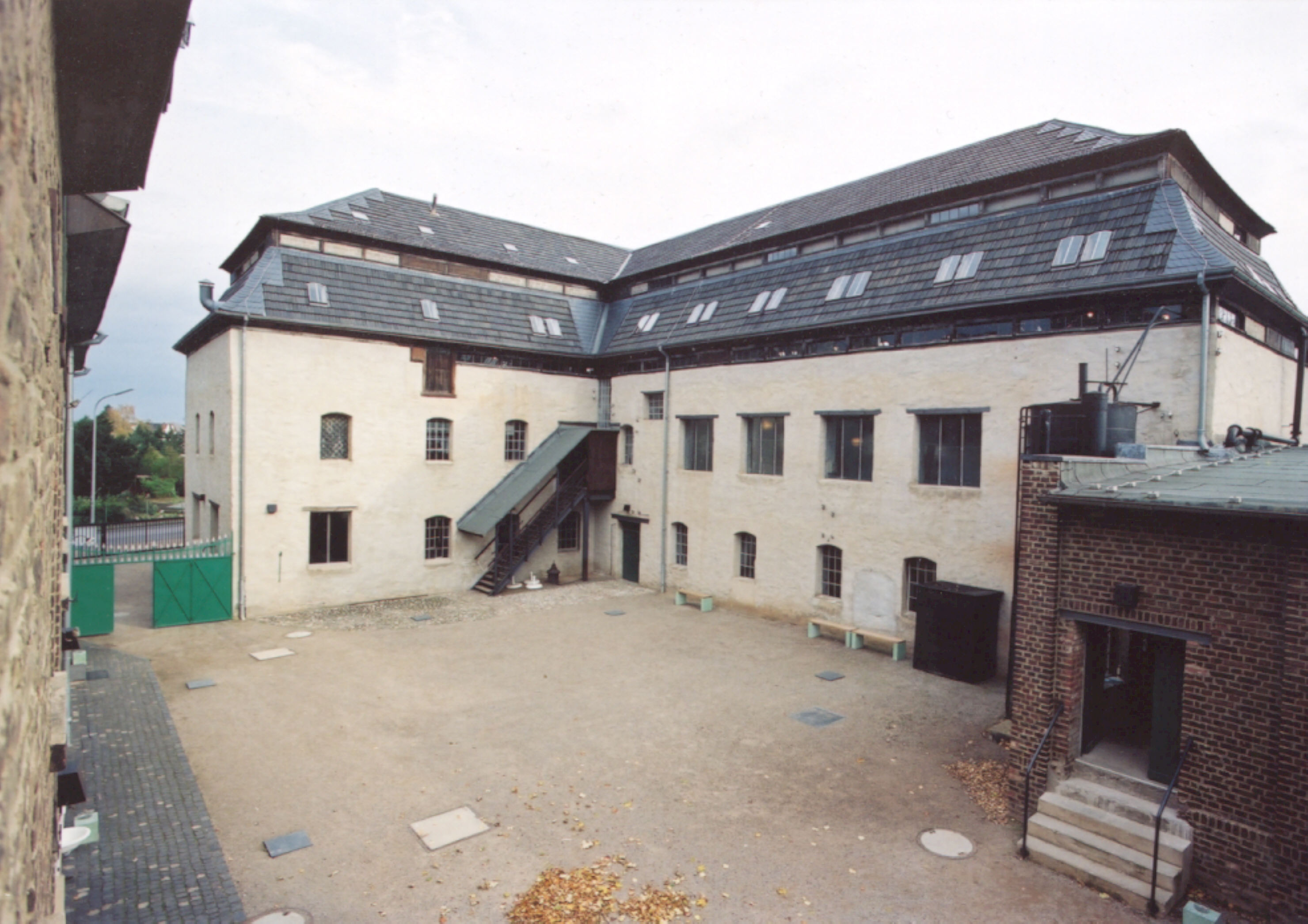
Main building (1801) and inner courtyard of the Müller Cloth Mill

The Müller Cloth Mill, located in Euskirchen, North Rhine-Westphalia, Germany is a section of the LVR Museum of Industry (formerly: Rheinisches Industriemuseum). The museum provides insight into the production process of a cloth mill by showing fully working machinery and equipment from around 1900. Opened in 2000, the museum preserves the mill's state at its shutdown in 1961. LVR Industrial Museum Müller Cloth Mill is an ‘Anchor Point’ of the European Route of Industrial Heritage and a central stop on the ‘Wool Route’.

== History ==
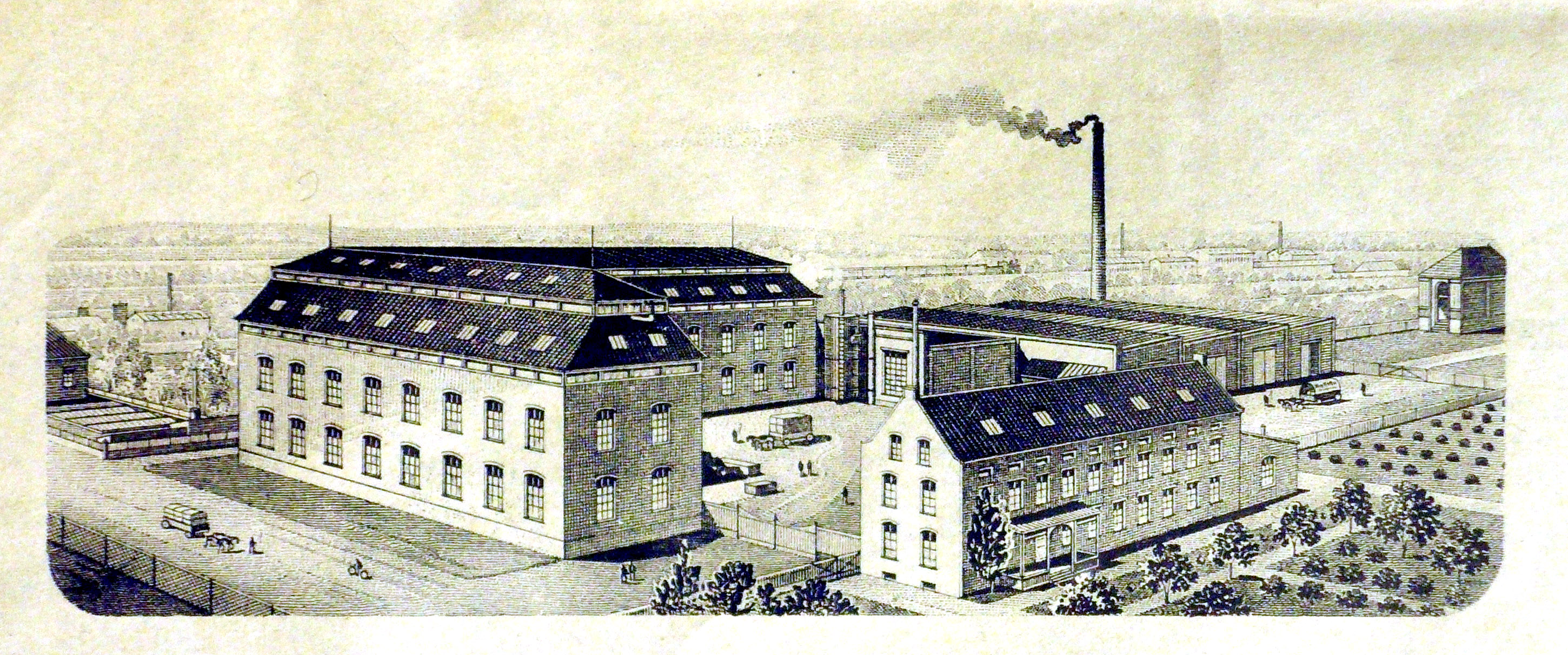
Letterhead around 1910

The factory started life as a paper mill in 1801. A few decades later things changed: in the mid-19th century the building was used to scour and spin wool and to full the cloth. After 1860, the increasing demand for power led to the installation of a new steam engine, which replaced the old mill wheel.

In 1894 Ludwig Müller purchased the building and set up a cloth mill. The whole process of production was brought together under one roof. Like most other regional mills Müller offered coarse woollen cloth, loden and uniform cloth. The machinery – bought in the years around 1900 – and the new steam engine from 1903 set the production on a firm basis. This equipment remained unchanged until the factory shut down. After Mueller's death in 1929, his son Kurt Müller led the mill. In 1961, the mill was finally closed due to lack of orders.

== Museum ==
Despite the shutdown of the cloth mill, Kurt Müller hoped to start production again one day. During the following years nothing happened in the mill. In 1988 the 'Rheinisches Industriemuseum' (Rhineland Museum of Industry) seized the opportunity and took over a completely fitted factory nearly untouched since the last day of work. The unique building, the machinery and thousands of small pieces of equipment were to be preserved. After careful stabilisation of the building and a comprehensive restoration the mill is providing an insight into the production of woolen cloth, into the different working processes and into the life of the workers. During guided tours through the mill, the old machinery from around 1900 is set in action.

Steam engine (1903)

Transmission

Carding machine (1913)

Spinning mule (1897)

Loom (1939)

The entire equipment and machinery was restored into conditions at the time of the closure of the factory in 1961. Therefore the 'key machines' (carding machine, spinning machine, threading machine, four weaving looms and a steam engine) running during guided tours had been restored to make them work properly like they did in 1961. Also disused machines and machines that are not in action nowadays were restored by preserving all traces of usage and improvisations to provide an authentic insight into the life of a cloth mill.
