= Hendrich's Drop Forge =

Coordinates: 51.1710°N 7.0326°E

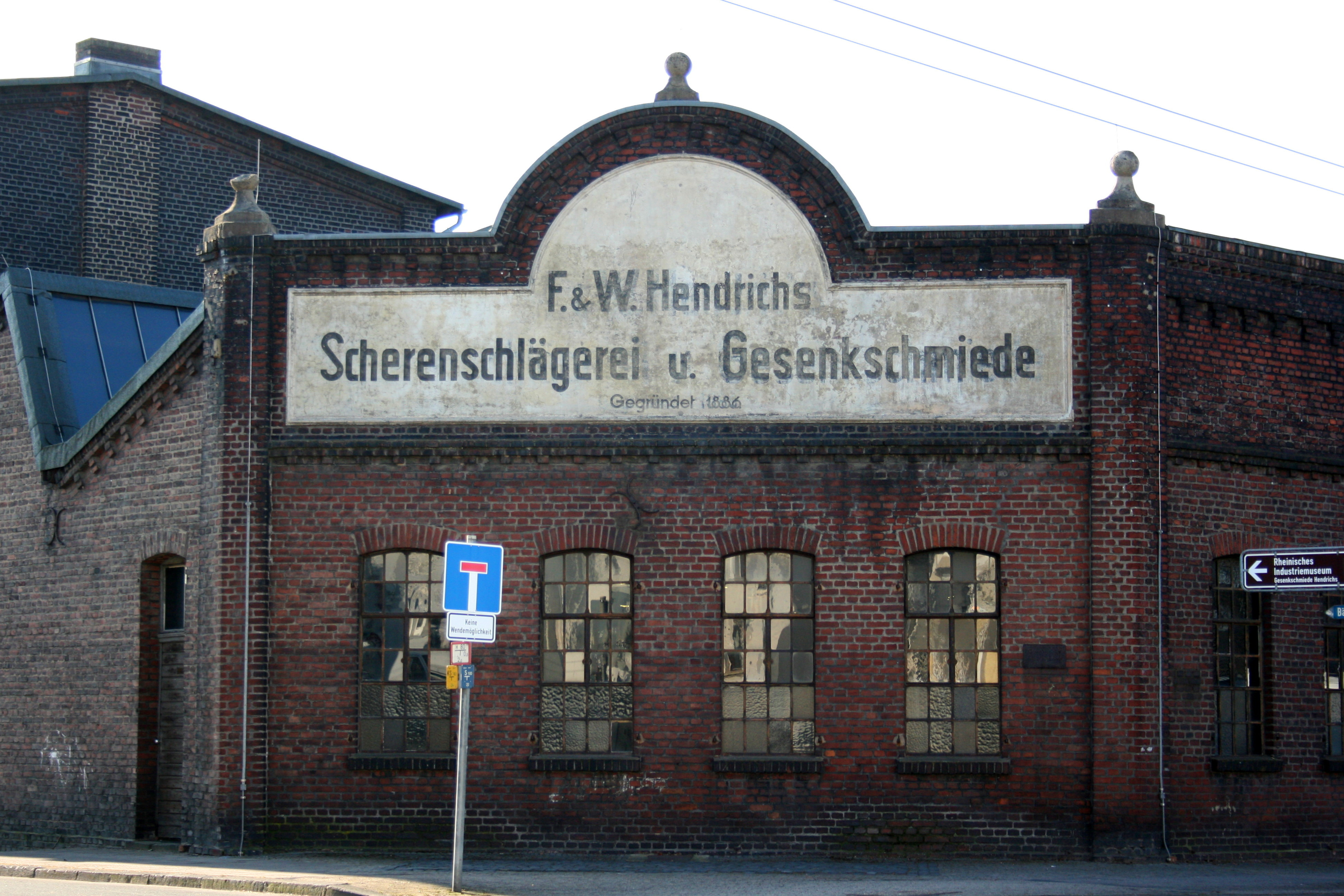

The Hendrich's Drop Forge part of the LVR Industriemuseum is a museum in Solingen (German pronunciation: [ˈzoːlɪŋən]), a city in North Rhine-Westphalia, Germany. It is located on the northern edge of the region called Bergisches Land, south of the Ruhr. The museum is an Anchor point on the European Route of Industrial Heritage.

== Context ==
The Hendrichs family firm was founded in 1886 during an economic boom in Solingen. Solingen in the "Bergisches Land" had turned out scissors, knives, and weapons since the Middle Ages. External conditions were ideal as there were limitless supplies of iron ore from the hills while the surrounding forests provided enough fuel to keep the fires burning. The River Wupper and its many tributaries provided the necessary hydraulic power for all the forging and grinding operations. Solingen's drop forges caused the town to become the world's largest producer of scissors.

== History ==
The Hendrichs Drop Forge in Solingen is around 120 years old and it continued as a commercial concern producing scissors until 1986. The LVR Industrial Museum took over the complete site including the buildings, technical equipment and nine members of staff.

== Process ==
The heavy, block-like forging dies were responsible for this: precision tools made of top quality steel into which the hollow outline of a scissor blade had been carved. The Hendrichs factory contained 33 drop hammers, which made it the largest drop forge in the area. The hammer only needed to be dropped a maximum of four times to forge a scissor blade from a narrow slab of steel.
