= LVR Industrial Museum =

Coordinates: 51°28′28″N 6°50′56″E

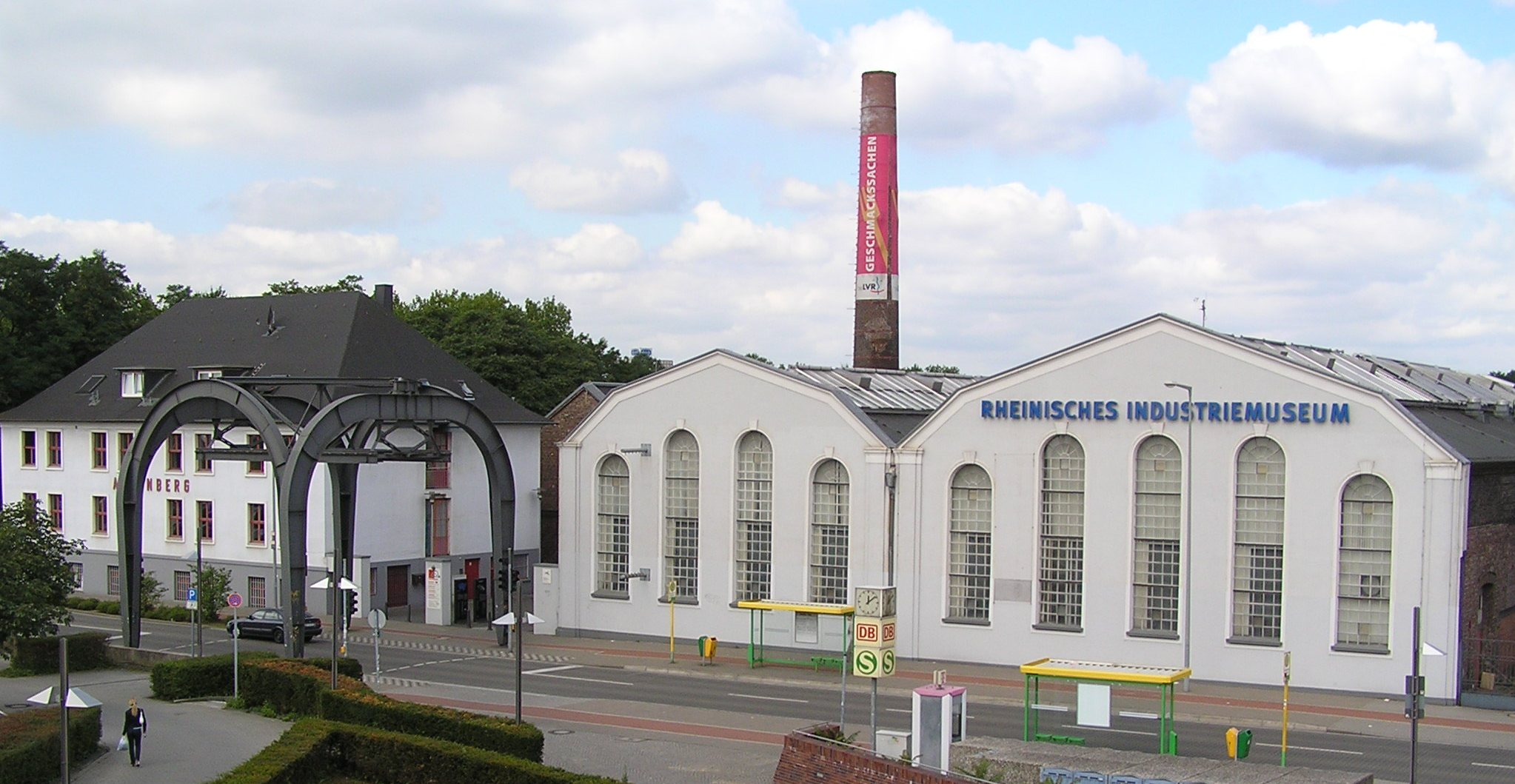
Rheinisches Industriemuseum

The Rheinisches Industriemuseum (lit. Rhineland Museum of the Industry) is a decentralized museum with six locations in Rhineland, western Germany. The locations are:

- Oberhausen: the main site at the old Zinkfabrik Altenberg (zinc factory), near the Oberhausen main station
- Ratingen: Textilfabrik Cromford (textiles factory), the first factory in continental Europe, named after the Cromford Mill
- Solingen: Gesenkschmiede Hendrichs (forge)
- Bergisch Gladbach: Papiermühle Alte Dombach (paper mill)
- Engelskirchen: Kraftwerk Ermen & Engels (hydroelectric power plant as part of the former cotton spinning mill)
- Euskirchen: Tuchfabrik Müller (textile factory)

The owner of the museum is the Landschaftsverband Rheinland (LVR).

== See also ==
- LWL-Industriemuseum (formerly: Westfälisches Industriemuseum), lit. Westphalian Museum of the Industry
