= Baumwollspinnerei Ermen & Engels =

Former cotton mill in Germany

Coordinates: 50.983544°N 7.409864°E

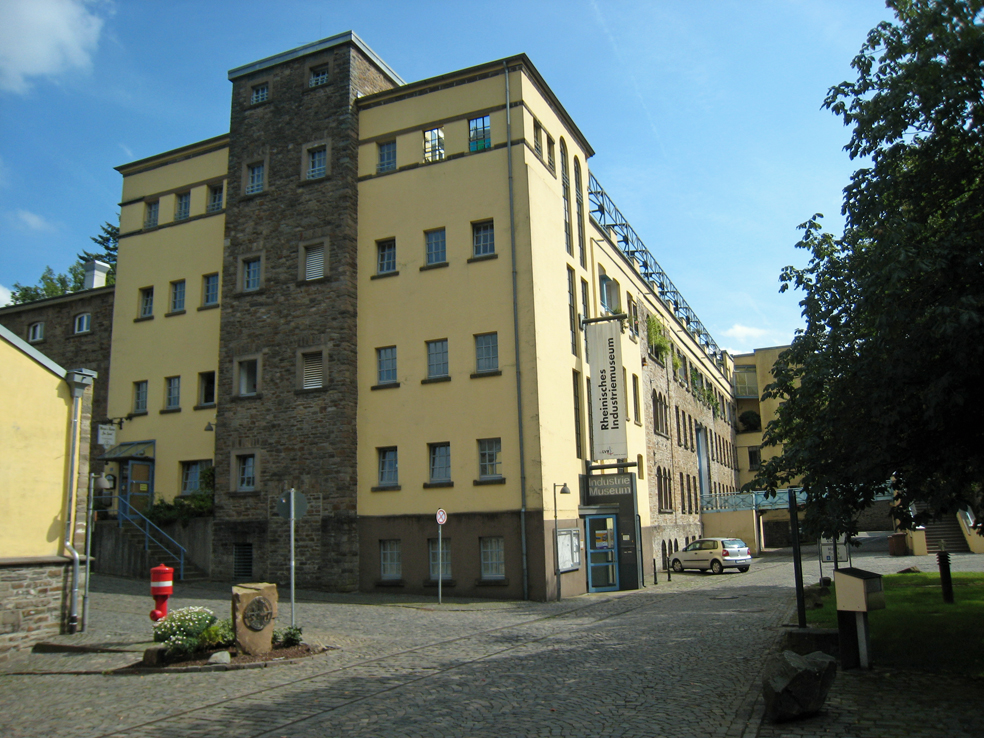
The LVR-Industriemuseum is located in the hydroelectric power plant building of the former Baumwollspinnerei Ermen & Engels, in Engelskirchen, Nordrhein-Westfalen

The Baumwollspinnerei Ermen & Engels is a former cotton mill in Engelskirchen, Nordrhein-Westfalen, Germany. Its hydroelectric power plant is now part of the LVR Industrial Museum.

== Location ==
Engelskirchen is midway between Cologne and Olpe, today served by the A4 autobahn. In 1840 it was a quiet village on the banks of the Agger (river), a tributary of the Sieg (river). In Bergisches Land it is 54 km south east of Barmen (Wuppertal). This put it in the heart of the North European Textile belt.

== History ==
Friedrich Engels from Barmen, was the father of Friedrich Engels who worked with Karl Marx on a series of influential literary works in the fields of sociology, philosophy and critique of political economy. Engels senior made a visit to Manchester in 1837 with the manufacturer Peter Albertus Ermen.

On their return, they founded the company "Peter Ermen & Co", which was renamed "Ermen & Engels" on 1 August 1838. They planned to convert the Unterbarmen church into a cotton spinning mill, which would spin and double yarn. The church was a two-story Fachwerkhaus, in the old Bergisches Land tradition, and by 1821 the town already had water-powered mills, warehouses and over 50 textile factories.

Also in 1837 Engels acquired the former Schnabelsch Hammerwerk in Engelkirchen with the ensuing water-rights. This enabled him to use water from the River Agger to drive a water-wheel, at a point where it dropped over a 20 feet (6.1 m) waterfall. There were expansion possibilities. This land was less expensive, and being less developed than Barmen there was a pool of available labour. The company, with capital from Manchester was founded 1 July 1837, with its head office in Barmen where it remained until 1885. Production started in 1844: in the 1970s all textile work had moved to Asia and closure occurred in 1979. The land was sold to a property company and the usual destruction took place. Before all had been destroyed it was protected as an important historical monument (Denkmalschutz). Alternative usage was sought, and reconfiguration occurred between 1993 and 1996.

== Power ==
The first mill was powered by water using a waterwheel, and the power transmitted to the individual machines using leather belts and lineshafts. in 1854 the water wheels were replaced by water turbines and reserve steam boilers, which could deliver 130 hp, were installed two years later.

In 1900 the turbines started to drive electric generators to power the machines, which had individual electrical motors. Three years later the turbines were providing electricity to the mill and to deliver electric street lighting to the town, and in 1909 the new company turbines were generating 640 hp.

In 1924 this had changed and the Elektrizitätswerk Engelskirchen was providing mains electricity to the whole town and to the factory from their steam turbines in the Kreiselektrizitätswerk in Dieringhausen. This became part of the Rheinisch-Westfälischen Elektrizitätswerk in 1935.

== Industrial museum ==
The museum is an integral part of the restored site. It is one of the sites of the LVR Industrial Museum. It is an important site to show the early generation of electricity, as well as demonstrating the cotton heritage. Some of the other buildings on the site have other usages. There is housing but also two buildings now act as the Engelkirchen rathaus (local government administrative buildings).

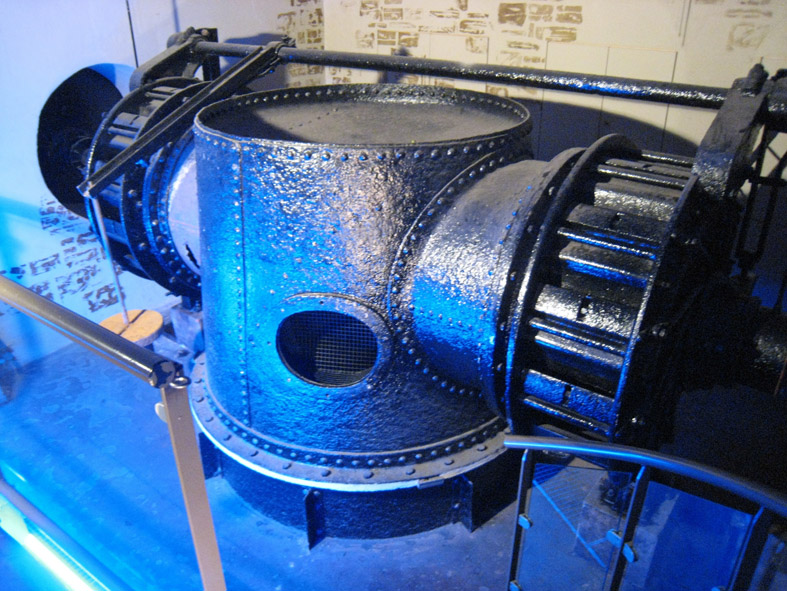
A Francis Turbine drives a flywheel

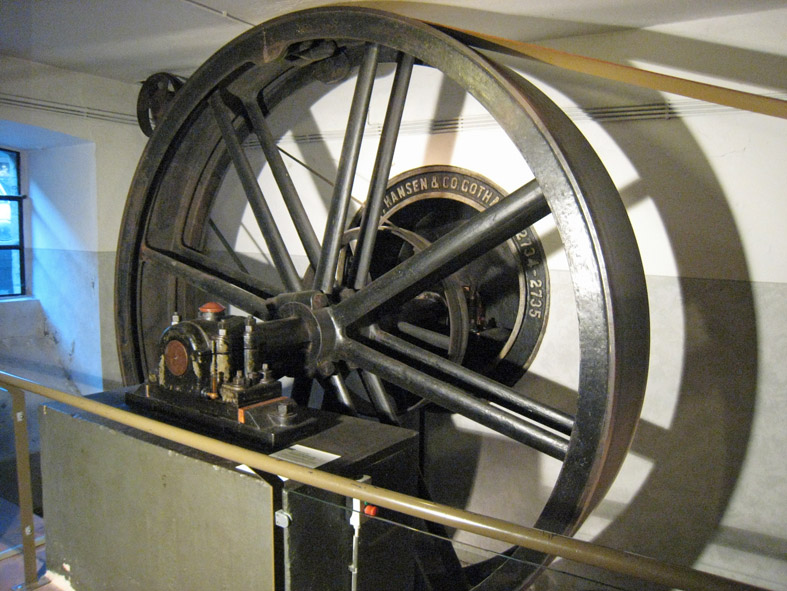
The flywheel drives a generator

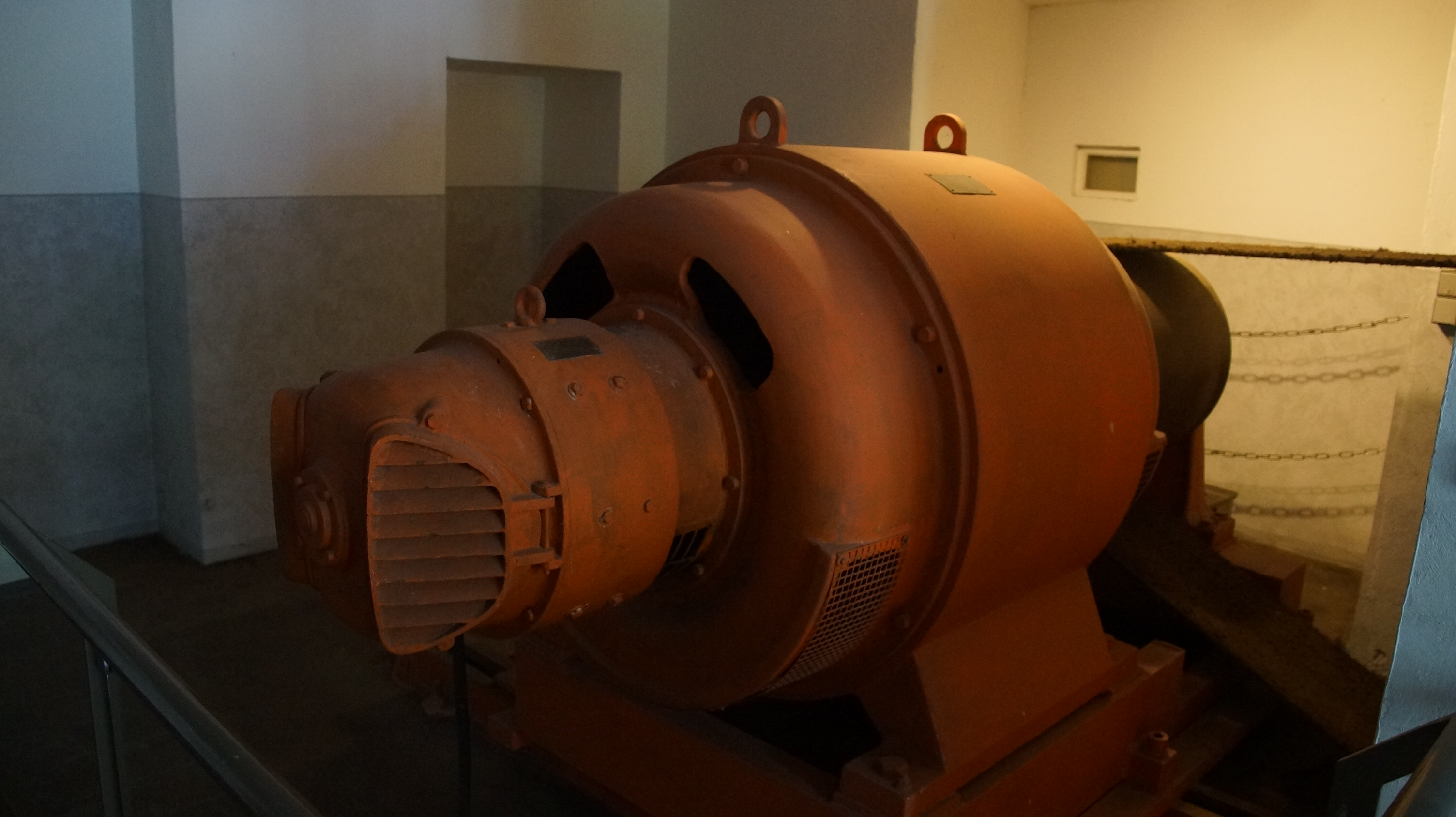
This generator produces electricity (6 kW at 750 rpm)

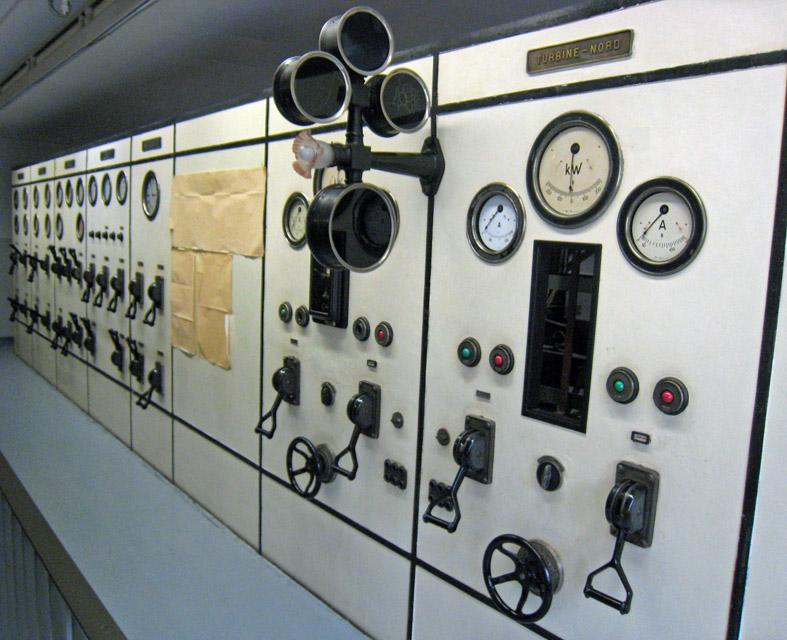
Switchboard

=== Cotton Gallery ===
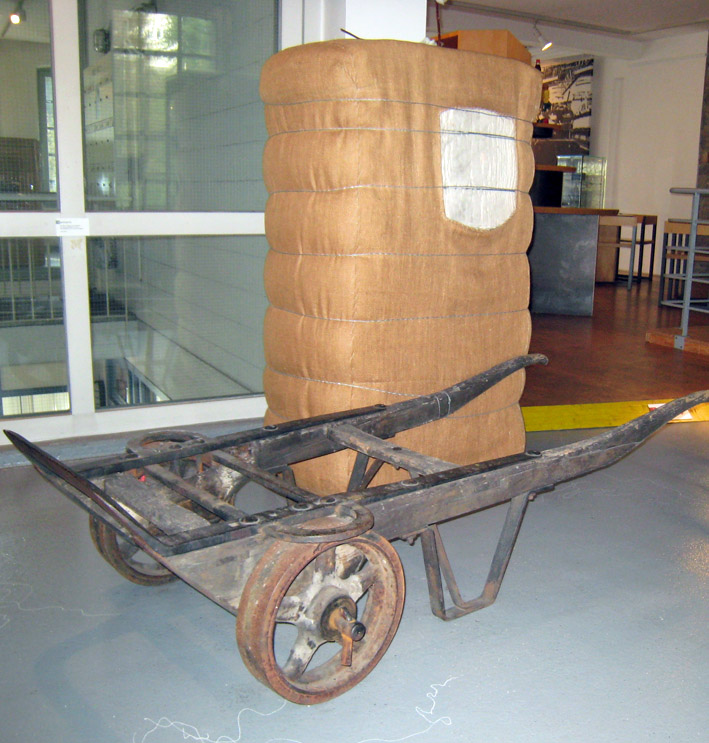
Bale of raw cotton

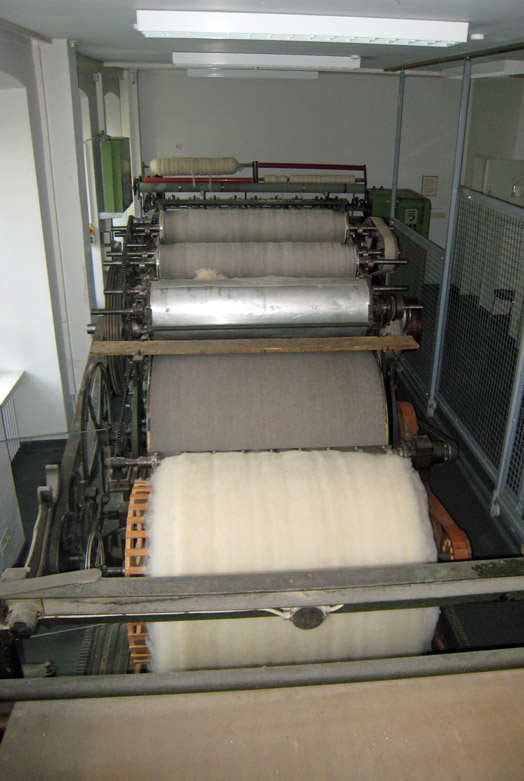
Carding machine

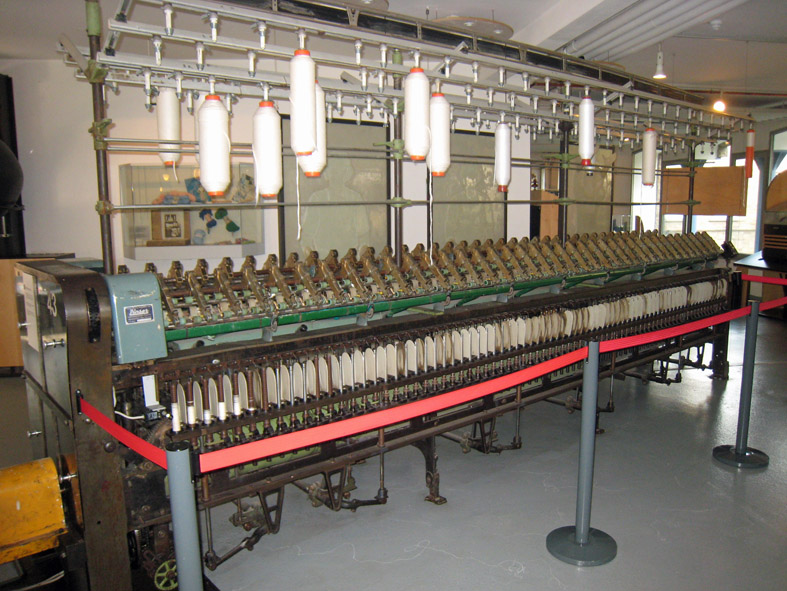
Ring spinning

== Owners ==
Ermen and Engels were prominent in cotton and had mills both in Bergisches Land and in Salford near Manchester and Oldham. It was to Victoria Mills, in the Weaste neighborhood of Salford that Friedrich Engels (the father) sent his son Friedrich in 1842. It was while working for the firm that Friedrich wrote his influential bookThe Condition of the Working Class in England. The book was written between September 1844 and March 1845 and printed in German in 1845 and in English in 1887. In the book, Engels gave way to his views on the "grim future of capitalism and the industrial age". The Engels were a pietist, fiercely Calvinist family with solid beliefs in predestination and the rejection of forms of worldly pleasure. Hardwork and prayer were mantras: and they saw no contradictions in creating vast wealth while neighbours, their employees remained in poverty; as that was their destiny. From Rhineland farming stock, the family's prosperity began when Johann Casper Engels (1715-1787) arrived in Barmen and saw that the crystal clear lime free waters of the Wupper was ideal for linen bleaching. He built up a mechanical lace production enterprise which he passed onto his sons. They were paternalistic employers, building houses, schools and a granary co-operative for his workers in Barmen. The second generation expanded the firm to include ribbon weaving. Johann Casper II became a town councillor and built the Barmen United Protestant Church. They were fabricants (merchant-manufacturers) representing everything Biedermeier. With the next generation, the family fragmented- the Engels & Sohne went to one brother, and Friedrich left to join the Ermen brothers to spin and double sewing cotton and trade in Manchester and Engelskirchen.

== See also ==
- Cotton mill
