= Stone Bell House =

Historic building in Prague, Czech Republic

- Czech: Dům U Kamenného zvonu
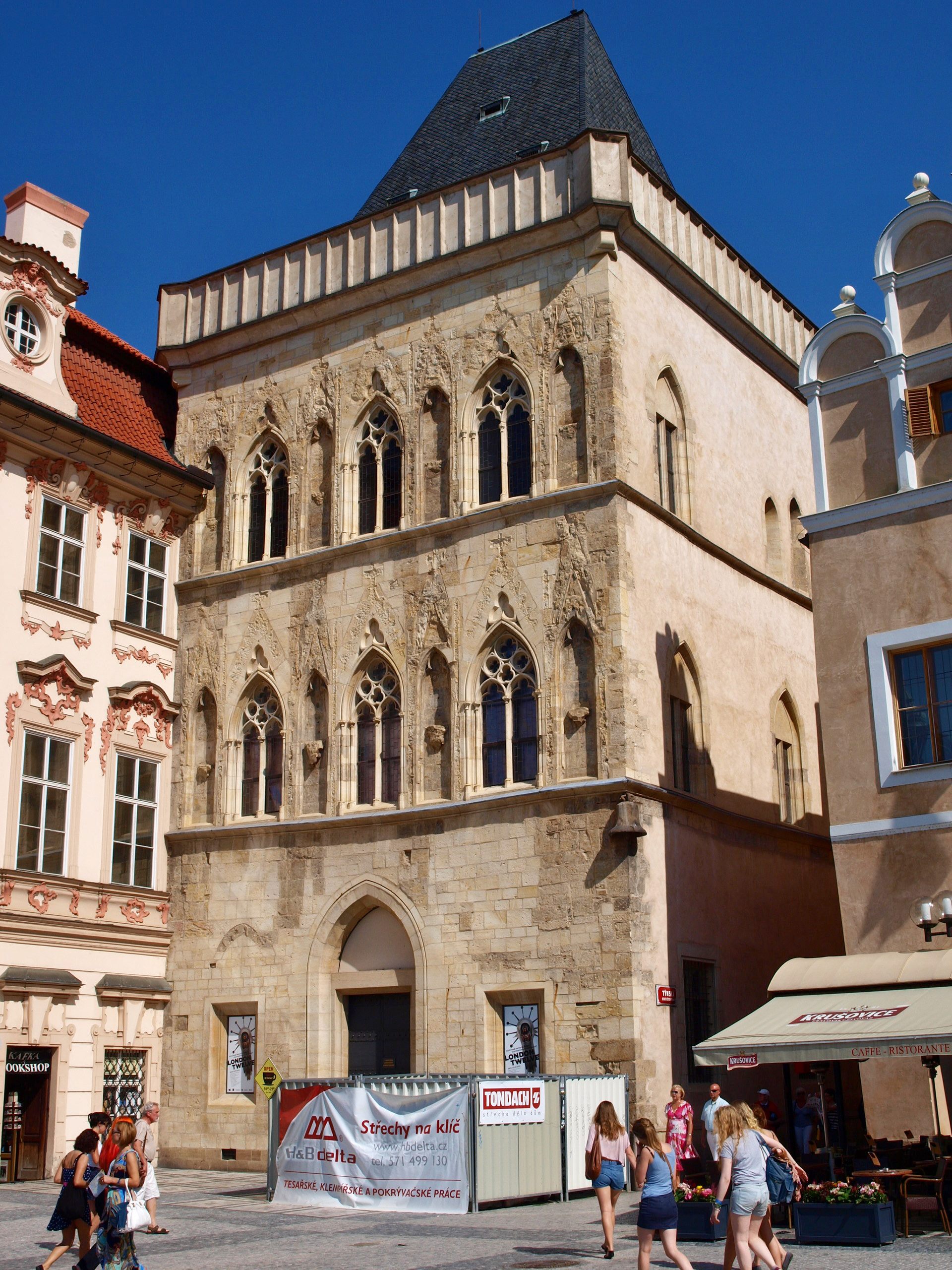
- Interactive map of the Stone Bell House area

General information
- Architectural style: Gothic
- Location: Old Town Square, Old Town, Prague 1, Staroměstské náměstí 605/13, Prague, Czechia
- Coordinates: 50°05′16.08″N 14°25′19.2″E
- Groundbreaking: mid-14th century
- Owner: National Gallery Prague

Technical details
- Material: Stone
- Floor count: 3

Design and construction
- Known for: bell

Website
- https://www.ghmp.cz

National Cultural Monument of the Czech Republic
- Official name: Dům U Kamenného zvonu
- Reference no.: 1000150692

The Stone Bell House (Czech: Dům U Kamenného zvonu) is located on the Old Town Square in Prague. It is located next to the Kinský Palace on the corner of Old Town Square and Týnská street.

== Origin of the name ==
The house is named after the stone bell embedded in the outside corner. The bell could be a reminder of the arrival of John of Bohemia to Prague in 1310, after a futile siege of the city occupied by Henry of Bohemia.

== History ==
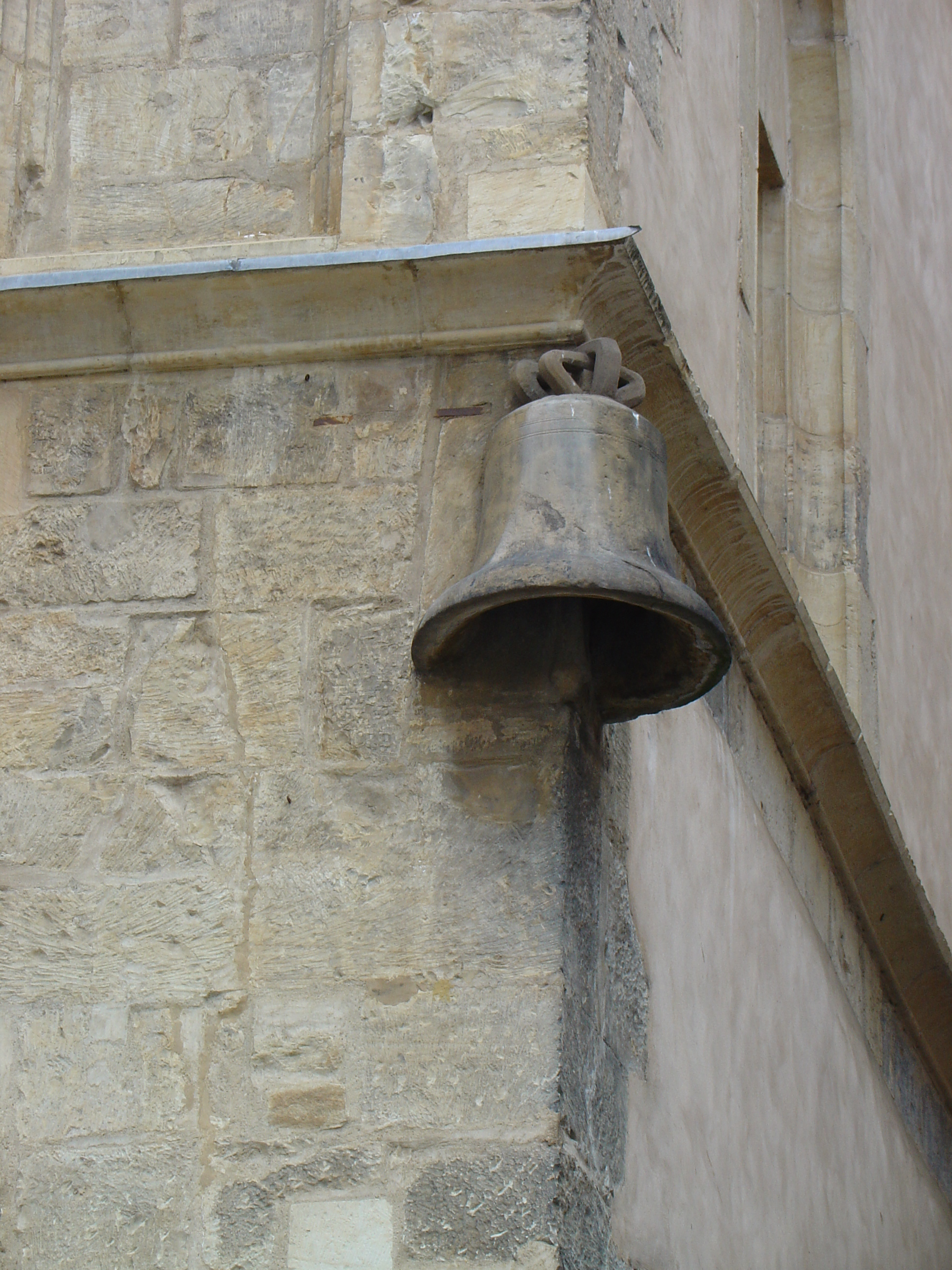
The stone bell

=== Summary ===
The house today is a remainder of a larger residence from the mid-14th century. It most likely served as a temporary residence for Elizabeth of Bohemia and John of Bohemia after their move to Prague.

The house was rebuilt during the 15th–19th century. During these years, the Gothic image of the palace was practically lost. Between 1975 and 1987 an extensive Gothic revival of the house was carried out. During this renovation, the Gothic facade was uncovered and restored, instead of the existing Baroque one. A reinforced concrete parapet was also added to the roof, which the house previously lacked. Since 1988 it is under administration of the National Gallery in Prague.

=== 14th–16th century ===
The first documented reference of the house dates back to 1363, when it belonged to the nobleman Henslin Pesold from Cheb. In the following years the house had many owners, ranging from rich noblemen to small nobles. Furthermore, the house was a gem of the square thanks to its intricate facade decorations which inspired the articulation of the eastern facade of the new city hall which was built at the end of the 14th century.

Between the years 1484 and 1513, the price of the house doubled. This suggests that the house underwent major renovations during these years. During the first decade of the 16th century, when the house was owned by Václav Šlechta from Pomberk, the eastern wing and a Renaissance portal were built. Also from this time, several paintings of draperies, which decorated the walls, have been preserved. Sometime after completion, the northern wing was added, which enclosed the courtyard.

=== 17th–19th century ===
A significant milestone for the house was the year 1685, when the house underwent another major renovation. All the Gothic elements which were protruding from the facade were removed and used in the walling up. The house also gained a new roof and its height was reduced. Another major adjustment was changing the number of floors of the corner tower from three to four, which gave the western facade a very distinct character. However, the articulation of three windows was preserved. The northern snail staircase lost its function as the main staircase due to changes in the floor-to-floor height and was used from then on as a pantry.

The year 1775 was another year of significant adjustments to the house. A built-on gallery, seated on massive Baroque brackets, was built in the inner courtyard and the western facade got a new stucco accentuation.

In the 19th century the house once again underwent smaller adjustments, although not nearly as significant as the previous reconstructions. For example, the Baroque facade was simplified. In the 90s however, the house regained its Neo-Baroque stucco decoration.

=== Restoration in the 20th century ===
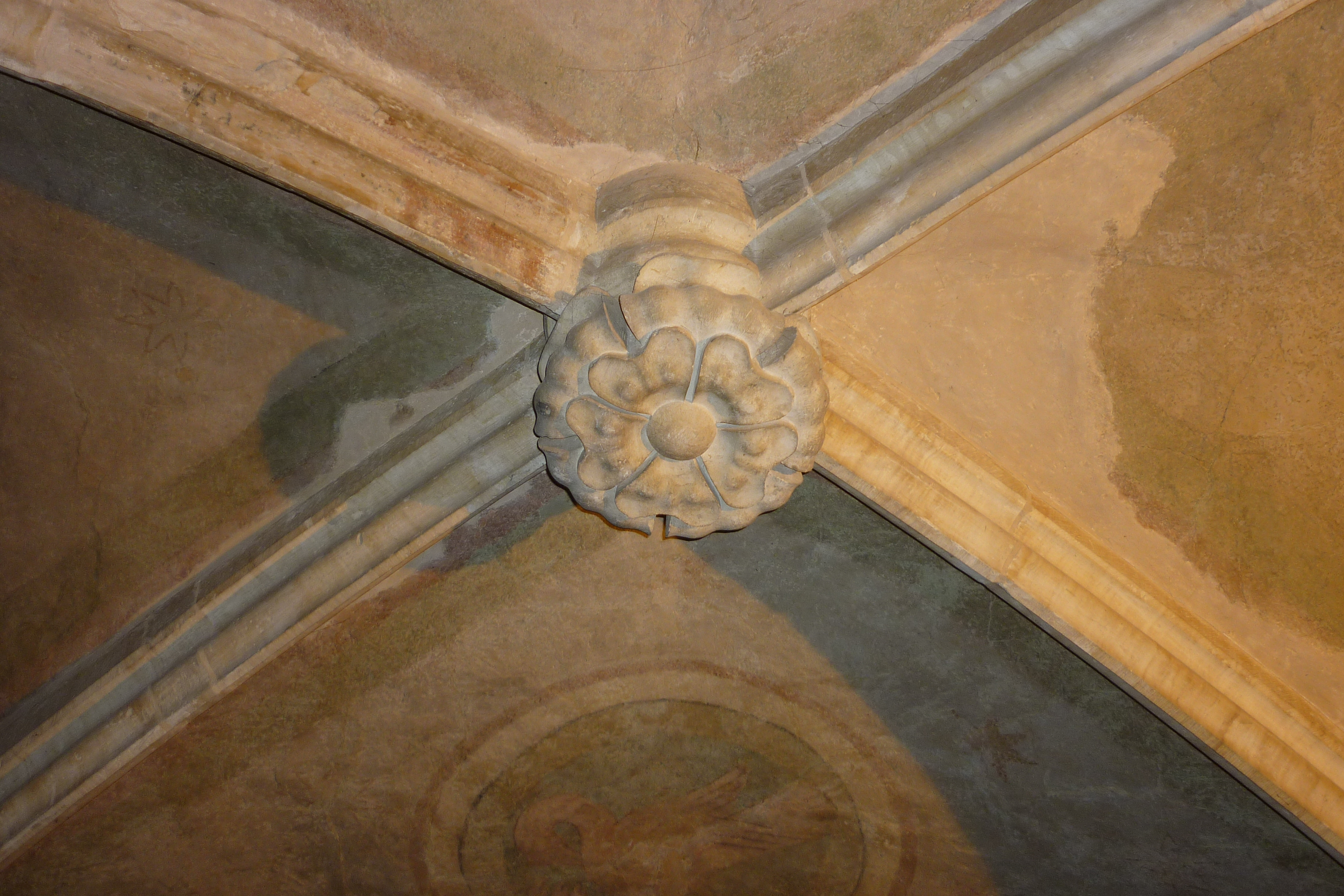
Boss in the ground floor.

During the 20th century, the rooms of the Stone House Bell were used as offices, storage spaces or workshops and the building slowly dilapidated. During the 60s, there were several historical surveys which showed that the house was an exceptional Gothic building. The Head of the State Institute for the Restoration of Historical Towns and Buildings (SÚRPMO) Jan Muk (civil engineer and art historian) together with Josef Hýzler (architect and architectural restorer) discovered the main facade from the Gothic period.

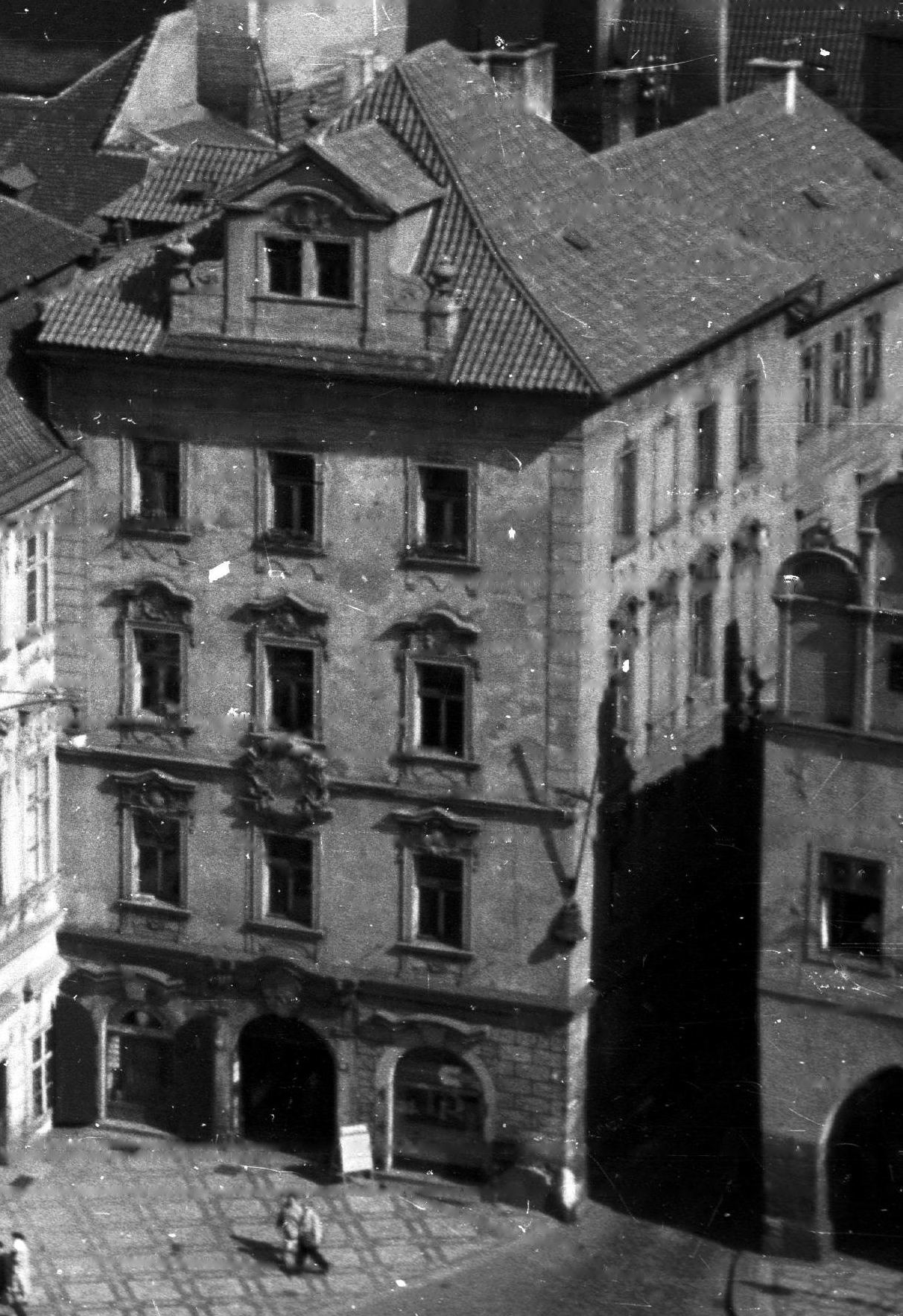
The house in 1959, before the Gothic restoration

After the surveys, a thorough Gothic revival of the house began in 1975 and lasted until 1987. The design works were undertaken by architects A. Charvátová and V. Pelzbauer, while the restoration of the Gothic architectural elements was under the guidance of architectural conservator-restorer Jiří Blažej. At the centre of the Old Town Square, a temporary stonemasonry workshop was created, where the fragments of the elements found in the brick backing were restored. Fragments of stone decorations were temporarily stored in the cellar of the house. Some were stored into a collection storage room. More than 12,000 fragments were found while renovating the house.

In the corner tower, the original two floors were restored, thus the Baroque windows were plated and the original Gothic windows were restored. The tracery was assembled from the found fragments; however, the baldachins with gablets between the windows were only preserved in the torso.

The roofing of the corner tower does not correspond with its historical situation. Originally, the house had a high chiselled roof made of shingles ending only with eaves. However, during the restoration, the designers gave the house a slate, which was not used in Gothic Prague because of its unavailability. They finished off the roof with a reinforced concrete machicolation.

Inside, restorers were able to find and restore polychromatic wooden ceilings on both floors as well as painted chapels on the ground floor and first floor. The snail staircase with garderobes was also restored. The inner courtyard, however, retained its Baroque appearance, including the built-on gallery, seated on massive Baroque brackets.

== Exterior ==
As the Stone Bell House is now called a corner tower to which the southern wing is connected. The eastern and northern wings which were completed later, enclose the courtyard of the house. The transverse west wing which was not preserved, stood at the site of today's Kinsky Palace. The facades were plastered with the exception of decorative stone around the jamb, which was very common with medieval burgher houses. The western facade however was an exception, as it was left completely unplastered.

=== Western facade ===
The facade facing Old Town Square is the most beautiful from the whole house. Compared to the other facades it is much more sophisticated and can boast with intricate stone carvings. Western lancet windows are regularly arranged in three axes. It has Gothic tracery with trefoils and quatrefoils which end with nuns. Above the windows were gables with trefoils inside, decorated with crockets and finished off with flowers.

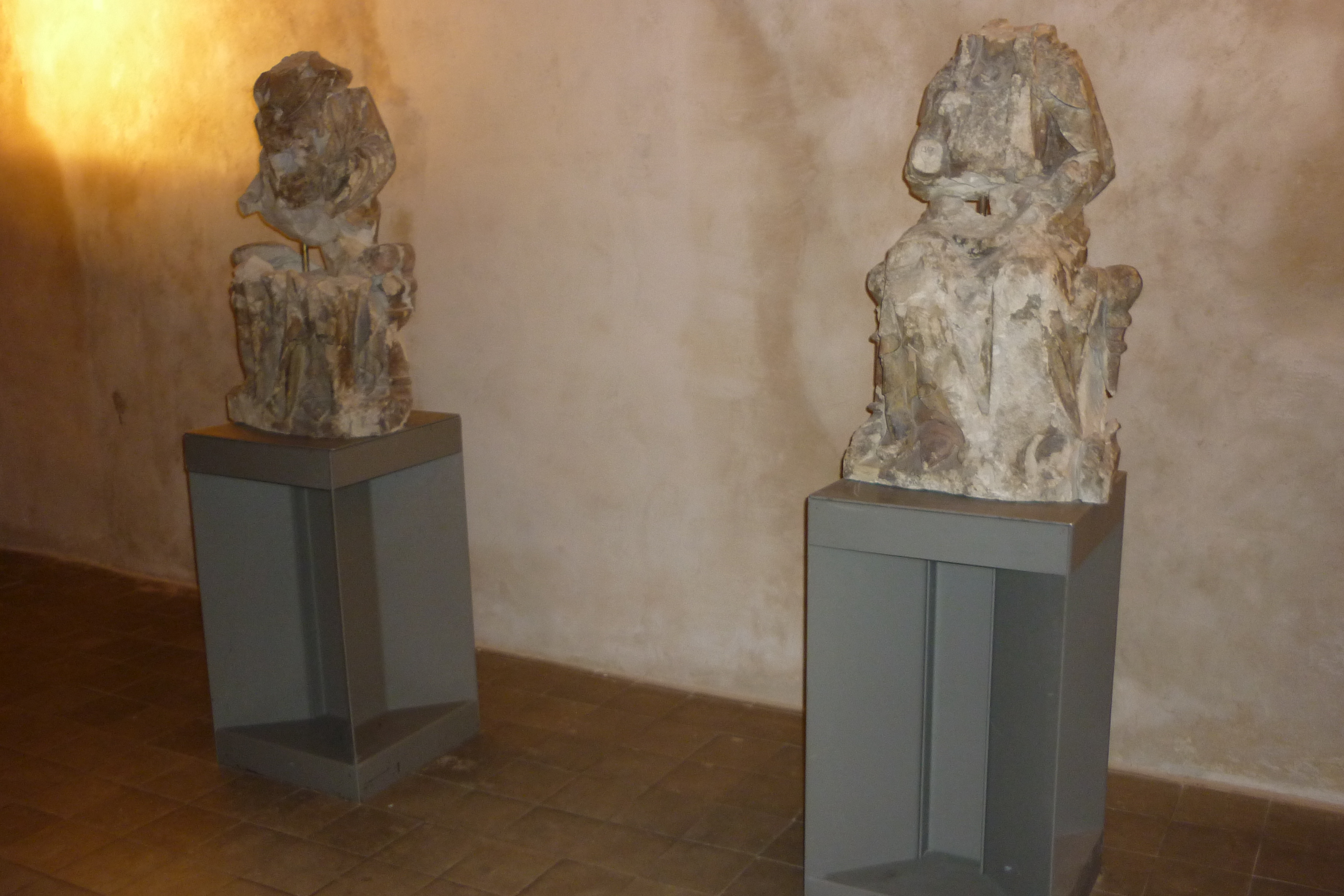
Torsos of statues of the King and Queen from the west facade of the house – currently in a chapel on the ground floor

Between the windows of the first and second floor were niches with brackets for statues. They were also finished with off with lancet arches, decorated with nuns and above them were gables with crochets and plants. On the sides of the niches grew pinnacles from waterleaf capitals.

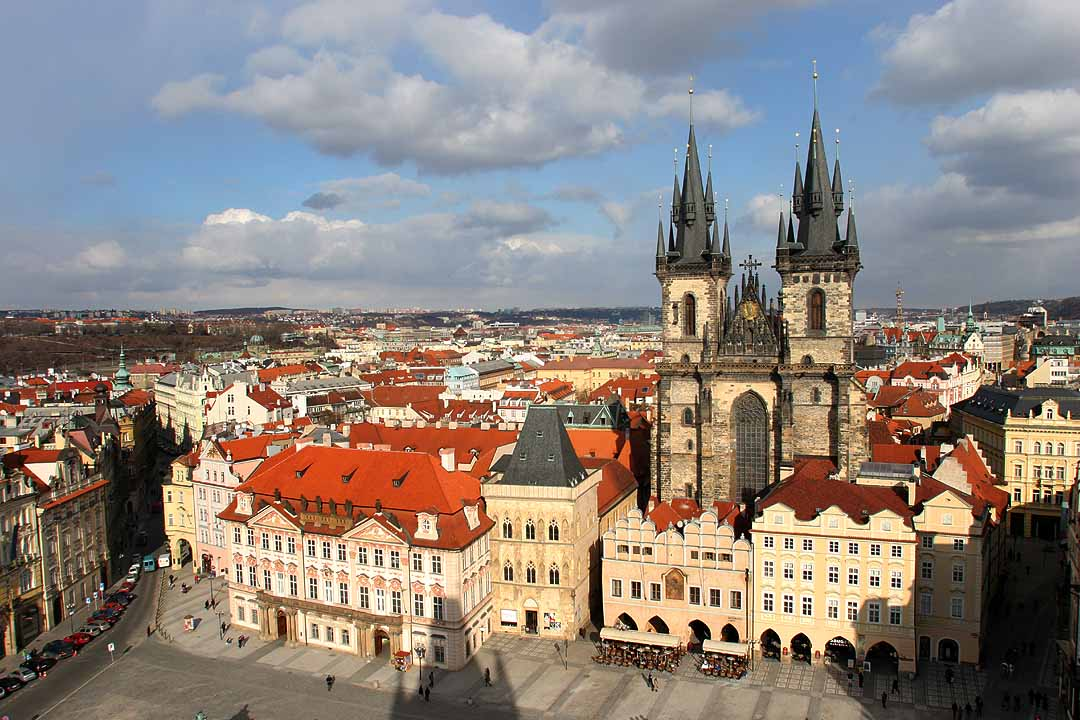
Position of the house between the Kinský palace Church of Our Lady before Týn within the Old Town Square

Inside these eight niches were statues. All were placed on brackets and protected by baldachins. Between the windows of the first floor were statues of kings and queens sitting on the throne. By their side, they were accompanied by knights in full armour. The torsos of these statues were reassembled from fragments by Jan Blažej and can be seen today in the chapel located on the ground floor. The statues in the niches of the second floor were not preserved. It is speculated, that there may have been the statues of saints – Czech patrons – Wenceslaus I, Vitus, Adalbert of Prague, and Procopius of Sázava. The ground-floor part of the facade could not be fully renovated due to poor condition. However, after findings of a horse rump, it is speculated that an equestrian statue could have been placed above its portal. The layout of the statues on the front facade and the ornaments refer to both the architecture of cathedrals, as well as ancient Byzantine art.

All window jamb profiles and other stone elements are of the same character and show unity, which is proof that the tower was built in a short period of time (around 1310) by a single masonry workshop. The statue decorations reveal that the artists belonged to the same masonry workshop, but it is not known which workshop in particular. While some sources refer to a French-oriented masonry workshop, others refer to a lodge from Cologne.

== Interior ==
=== Ground floor ===
The entire ground floor of the tower is made up of an entrance hall that leads through a passage into the courtyard. The width of the passage indicates that the house could be ridden through on a horse but not a horse-drawn carriage. The carriageway was accessible from the Týnská alley behind the building.

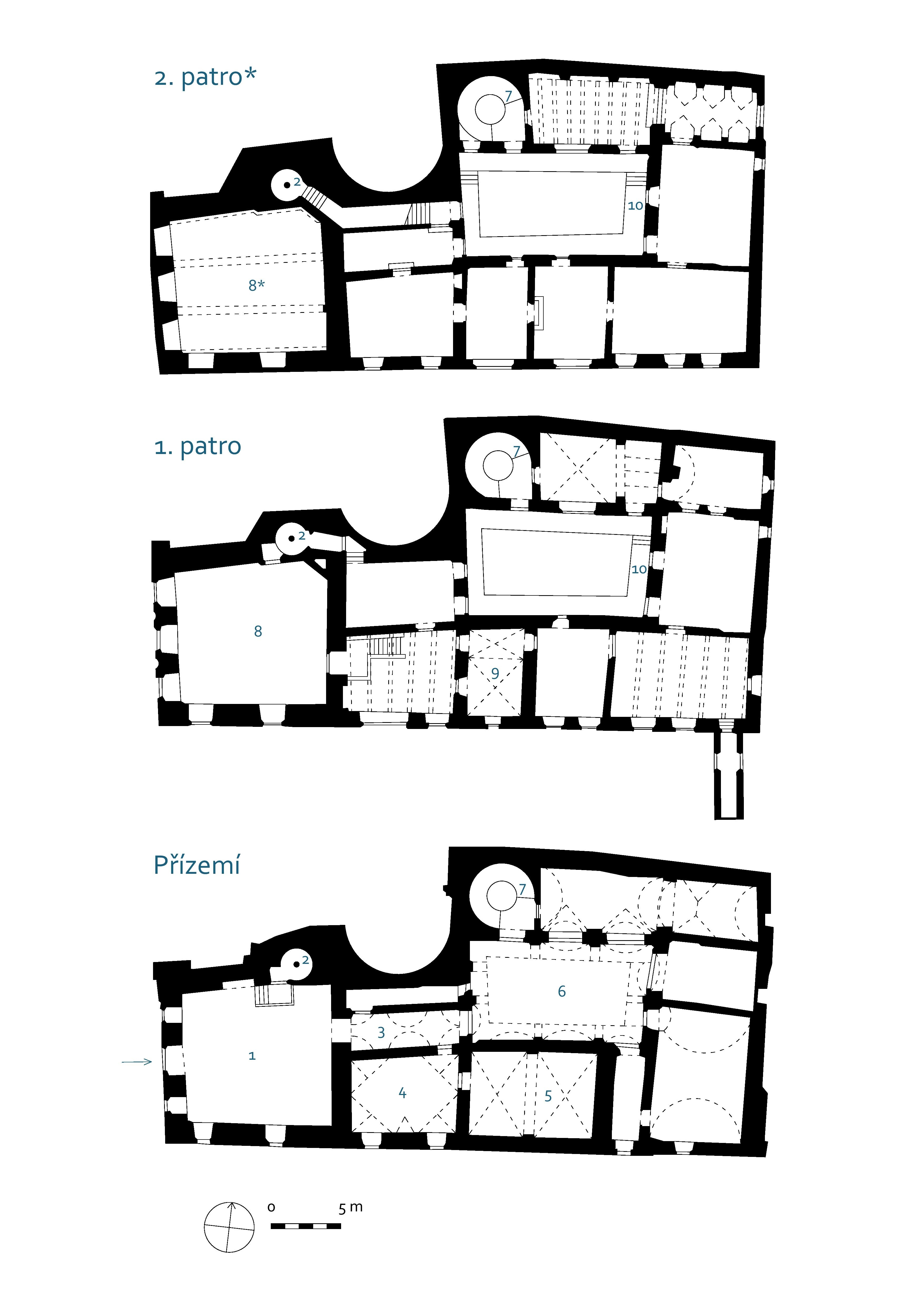
Floor plans: 1 – Entrance hall, 2 – Small spiral staircase, 3 – Passageway to the yard, 4 – Passageway to the chapel, 5 – Lower chapel, 6 – Courtyard, 7 – Large spiral staircase, 8 – Hall on the first floor of the tower, 9 – Private chapel, 10 – Built-on gallery

A chapel is accessible from the passageway through small Gothic portals. The architectural concept of the space indicates it was not originally intended to be a chapel. It is a long room with two bays of ribbed groin vaults divided by a wide stone strip. The windows facing into the courtyard and into the street are plain and of rectangular shape. The room lacks liturgical requisites except for the murals with a sacral theme, dating back to 1310, which suggest the space was a chapel, despite the walls dating back to the second half of the 13th century. Before the space was consecrated, there may have been a shop or a merchant's room, which in medieval houses was usually located behind the entrance hall.

It should however be noted, that also domestic chapels in Central Europe were often situated in very similar spaces with two bays of vaults.

=== First floor ===
The tower is accessible from a spiral staircase, located on the left side of the entrance hall. It connects the individual floors of the corner tower. It is used to access the garderobes, and originally allowed entrance to the first floor of the west wing, which had a lower floor-to-floor height.

The space of the first floor of the corner tower is once again unified, and there is no doubt that it was used as a representative hall. There are three richly decorated lancet windows which face west towards the square and have stone seats beneath them. The lateral windows facing the side street are rectangular shaped, but from the outside they look like lancet windows with a tympanum. On the northern wall, there is a restored painting showing elements of court art of the second half of the 14th century.

The key point in identifying the room's purpose is the lancet arch portal when entering the spiral staircase from the hall. The portal boasts with a finely profiled jamb with a tracery at the top. On the sides there were brackets in the form of lions' heads and out of these grew pinnacles.

Also worth mentioning is a private oratory located in the southern wing. Unlike the chapel on the ground floor, which is located directly below the oratory, the purpose here is clear. The chapel is situated between living chambers and from the location of the door, it shows that it was accessible from both sides and served as the last chamber in this floor. Church services could be viewed by the residents of the house from the adjoining chamber through a horizontal mullioned window.

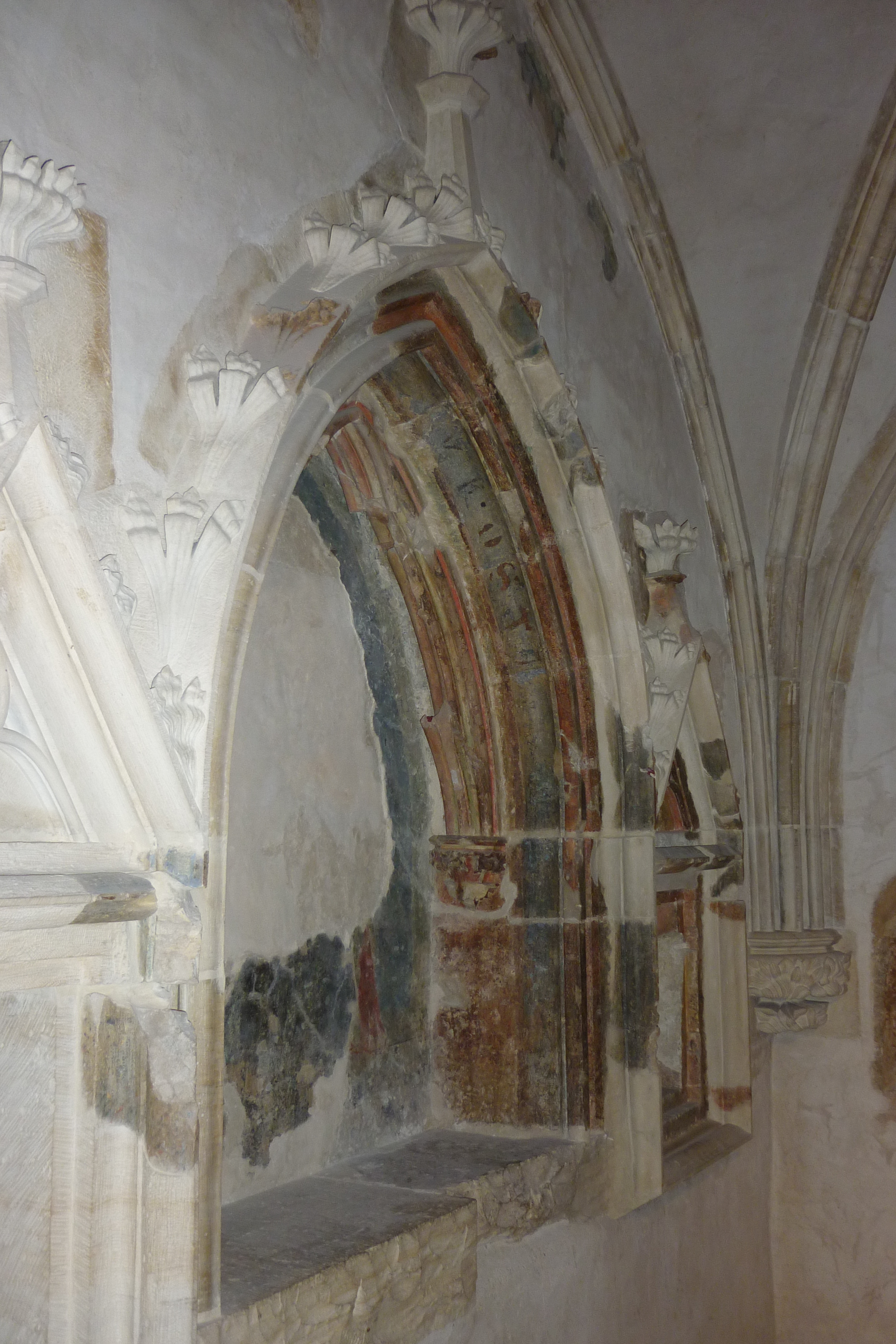
Example of polychromy in a niche in a private oratory

Inside, the oratory exuberated with many architectural details. The most significant include a trefoil niche in the east wall. The largest middle foil had a lancet arch with a tracery on the top placed on brackets with vegetal patterns. At the bottom it was finished off with a protuberant cornice, which replaced an altar. Square-shaped niches by the sides complemented with gamblets served as tabernacles and reliquaries. All three niches are decorated with crochets and flowers. Partially preserved are also polychrome (saturated red and blue colors) niches.

The oratory has two groin vaults with ogee moulded vaulting ribs, yielded by brackets with once again vegetal patterns. The northern boss is speculated that to have been shaped like the sun, while the southern boss like a crowned face.

It is also speculated that other chambers of the first floor served for private purposes, except for the unpreserved transverse hall located in the west wing. Besides the small snail stairway in the tower, the rooms were accessible mainly from the wide spiral stairway in the north wing.

=== Second Floor ===
On the second floor of the tower there is a unified space, which was renamed during renovations in the 20th century as the throne room of Elizabeth of Bohemia. It boasts with lancet windows to the west and a triple niche in the southern wall, which is speculated to have been a space for the grand throne. Two brackets found during the renovation of the house are located on the eastern wall, indicating that a fireplace had been here in the past. Above them there is an opening or a niche, connected to the flue of the fireplace. However, the claim that the throne room was actually located on the second floor has its drawbacks.

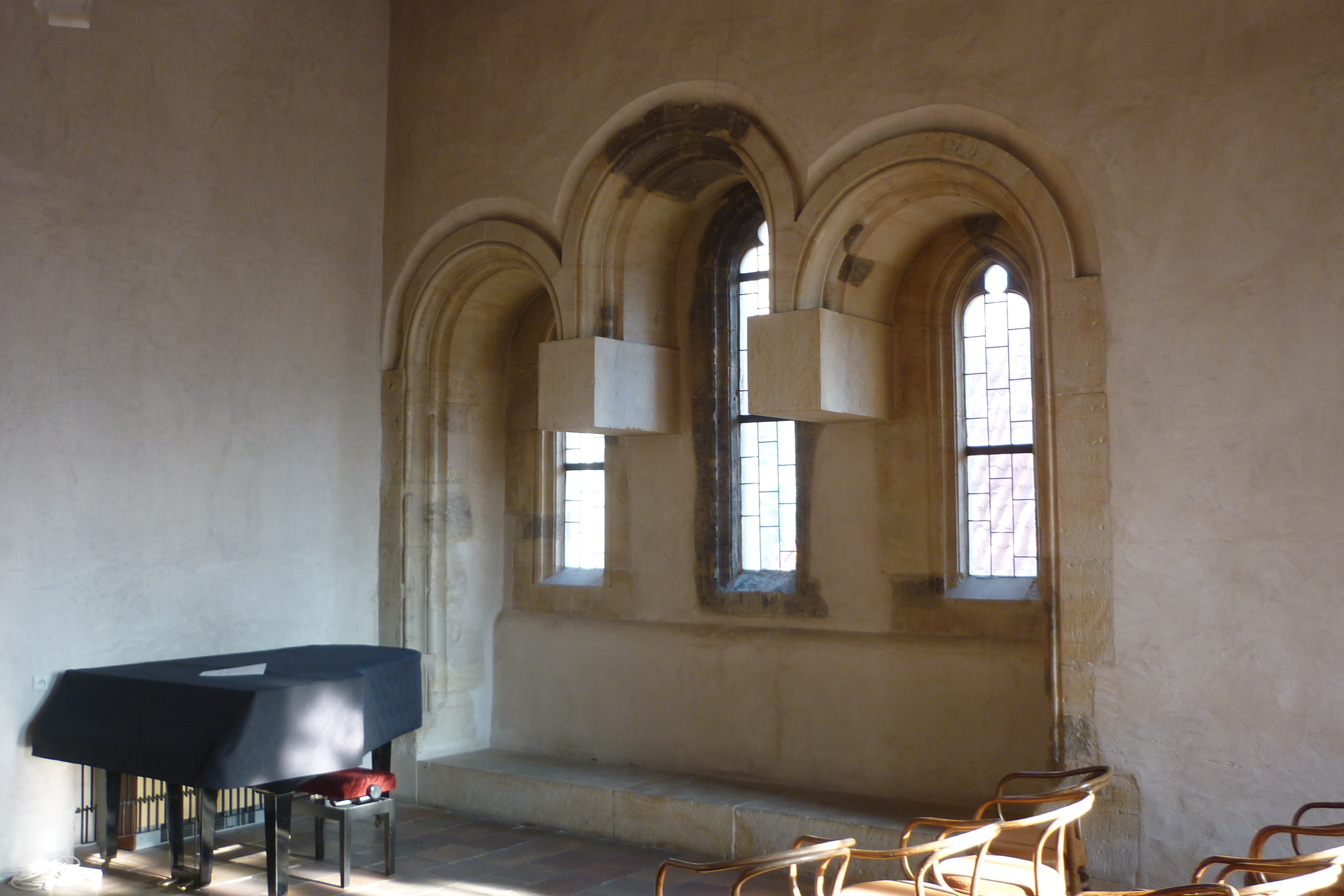
Triple niche in the southern wall of the hall on the second floor

Firstly, it is worth noting that the passage between the snail staircase and the hall is not nearly as decorated as the portal of the floor below. This indicates a space of less importance. Another breach in this speculation is the fact that a representative hall already existed on the first floor, another hall therefore lacks purpose. Furthermore, the flue over the fireplace was wrongly dated and is much newer than the opening above it. This proves, that the fireplace was most likely added to the room during the later renovations, the stone brackets therefore do not cohere with it. The research of associate professor Rykl and professor Škabrada shows that these brackets could have been placed in the apex of the triple niche, today finished off with unmoulded stone blocks. According to their opinions, the room was divided into a smaller entrance hall, a room with heating and a hall room with windows in the wall facing the Old Town square.

The three rooms were supposedly divided by wooden partitions, the room with heating had a lower wooden ceiling, its structure unfolding from the triple niche. Warm smoke could then be pumped into the space above the room, from where the smoke could escape through the opening by the ceiling. Wooden structures which forged a room with heating inside a larger room were not unusual in the Middle Ages. The room was inhabited probably by women and children in the colder months and could even serve as a place to sleep. The hall next to it was used mainly in the summer. From the layout we can assume that a set of living chambers were located on the second floor of the tower, which typologically corresponds to the more sophisticated buildings of the period.

The second floor of the other wings was not directly accessible from the second floor of the tower due to height differences. The layout corresponded to the layout of the rooms located on the first floor, with the difference that the hall of the transverse wing was probably replaced with more private chambers.

== Interesting facts ==
- The Royal Palace of the Prague Castle was uninhabitable for some time after the fire in 1303, therefore it is possible that John of Bohemia and Elizabeth of Bohemia lived in the Stone Bell House, and that Charles IV was born here in 1316. He may have stayed here shortly even after his return to Bohemia in 1333.
- Since 2012 the Brikcius Festival is held here – a cycle of concerts of chamber music (spring-autumn.)
- Today, it is hard to understand the extensive Baroque adjustments of the building. The changes they made to the Gothic elements of the house are somewhat drastic and incomprehensible. However, it is important to mention, that the research carried out by Jan Blažej revealed that most of the elements were in very poor condition at the time and the whole house seemed to look dingy. This was due to the inappropriate use of marlite on the facade. The use of low-quality stone, or the moulding of some elements caused the architectural elements to be exposed to the effects of water. The Baroque adjustments were therefore essential and brought the building greater comfort of living.
- Renovations from the 1960s to the 1980s are still a subject of many disputes. The added concrete wreath of the gallery is controversial as well as use of the technique anastylosis. This technique leaves the original elements in place wherever possible and restores the broken ones with exact replicas. Although opinions on the Gothic revival of the building differ and some scientific circles even reject or disagree with it, the building still remains to be one of great importance in Europe and is an extraordinary example of the profane Gothic architecture which is unparalleled in areas east of France.

== Exhibitions ==
In the building is located The Prague City Gallery, so in the house are often placed exhibitions of the modern and contemporary art, which make a very interesting and special contrast in the antient space of the rooms and halls.

- June 2018 – September 2018 – Santiago Calatrava: Art and Architecture

== See also ==
- Old Town Square
- Old Town Hall (Prague)
- Elizabeth of Bohemia
- John of Bohemia
- Old Town (Prague)
- Czech Gothic architecture

== Sources ==
- HANÁK, Milan. Dictionary of Architecture and Building Construction. 1st edition. Prague: Grada Publishing, a.s., 2017. ISBN 978-80-247-5035-4.
- ŠEFCŮ, Ondřej. ARCHITEKTURA – Lexikon architektonických prvků a stavebního řemesla. 1st edition. Prague: Grada Publishing, a.s., 2013. ISBN 978-80-247-3120-9.
- BENEŠOVSKÁ, Klára; VŠETEČKOVÁ, Zuzana. Dům „U Kamenného zvonu“. In: VLČEK, Pavel a kol. Umělecké památky Prahy. Staré Město – Josefov. Vyd. 1. Praha: Academia, 1996, 639 s. ISBN 8020005382.
- BENEŠOVSKÁ, Klára. Dům u Kamenného zvonu jako městská královská rezidence. In: Královský sňatek: Eliška Přemyslovna a Jan Lucemburský – 1310. Editor Klára BENEŠOVSKÁ. Praha: Gallery, 2010, 589 s. ISBN 978-80-86990-55-2.
- LÍBAL, Dobroslav. Období vrcholné gotiky za Jana Lucemburského. In: POCHE, Emanuel. Praha středověká: čtvero knih o Praze: architektura, sochařství, malířství, umělecké řemeslo. 1. vyd. Praha: Panorama, 1983, 780 s., [16] s. obr. příl. Pragensia (Panorama).
- ŠKABRADA, Jiří; RYKL, Michael. Byt ve druhém patře věže domu U zvonu /. Škabrada, Jiří – Rykl, Michael. In: Zprávy památkové péče. Časopis státní památkové péče. Praha: Státní ústav památkové péče 56, č. 1–2, (1996), s. 12–16.
- ŠTULC, Josef. Naděje, pochybnosti a rizika rekonstrukčních projektů – příklad domu U Zvonu a Malostranské radnice v Praze /. Štulc, Josef. In: Zprávy památkové péče. Časopis státní památkové péče. Praha: Národní památkový ústav 67, č. 4, (2007), s. 310–315.
- BLAŽEJ, Jiří. Cesta za podobou soch z průčelí domu U kamenného zvonu /. Blažej, Jiří. Zprávy památkové péče. Časopis státní památkové péče. 62, č. 4, (2002), s. 73–116.
