= Alte Kirche =

Alte Kirche may refer to:

- Alte Kirche (Dresden-Leuben)
- Alte Kirche (Wuppertal-Langerfeld)
