= Wefelpütt =

Coordinates: 51°14′N 7°15′E

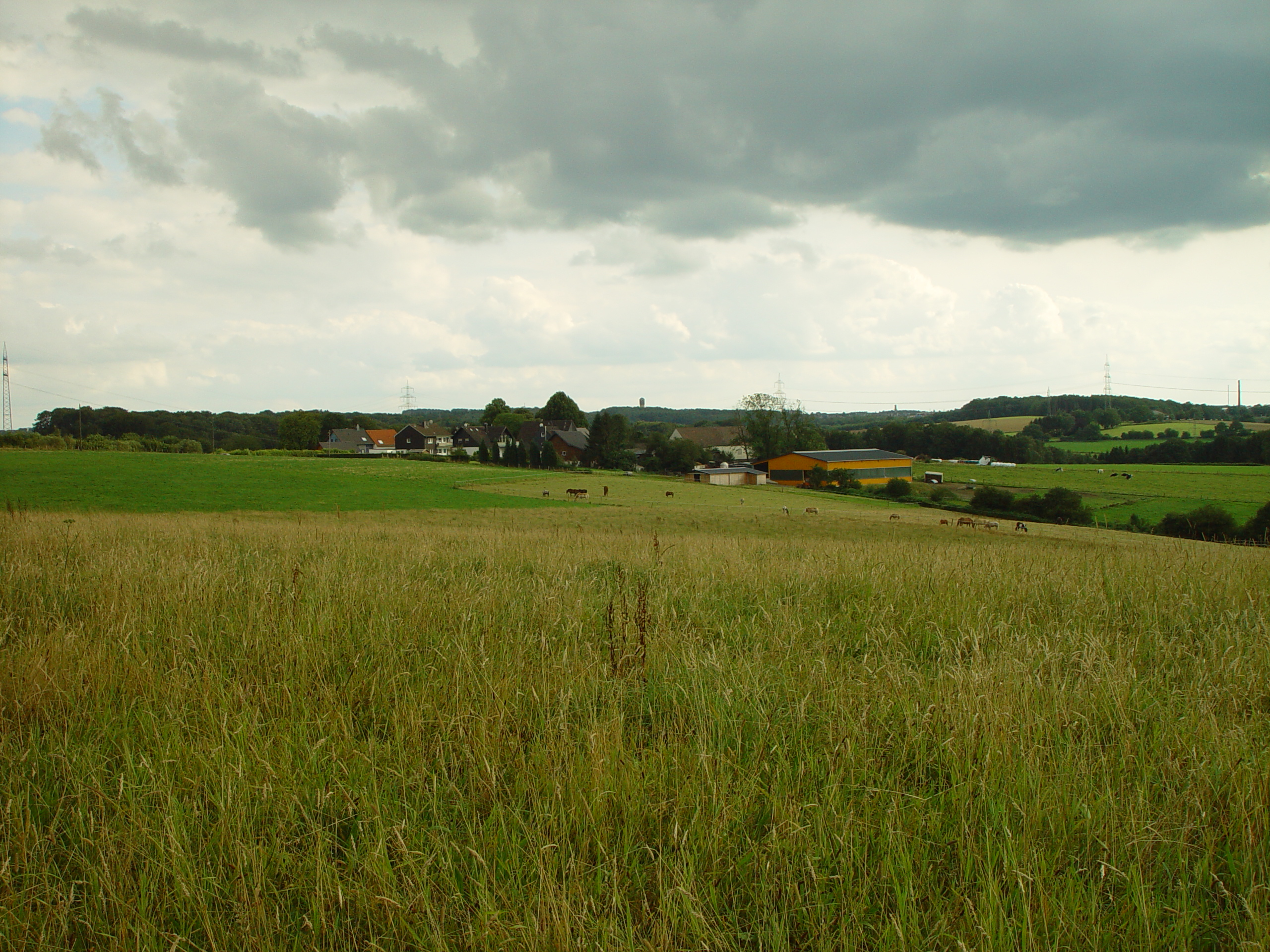
Wefelpütt

Wefelpütt is a small village in Germany with only 63 inhabitants.

Since 1929, it belongs to the city of Wuppertal.
