= Lichtscheid =

Highest hill in Wuppertal, Germany

Coordinates: 51°14′36″N 7°11′23″E

The Lichtscheid is the highest hill of the German city of Wuppertal.

It has an elevation of 350 metres (1,150 ft).

== See also ==
- List of mountains and hills in North Rhine-Westphalia
