= Alte Kirche (Wuppertal-Langerfeld) =

Protestant church

Coordinates: 51°16′28″N 7°14′40″E

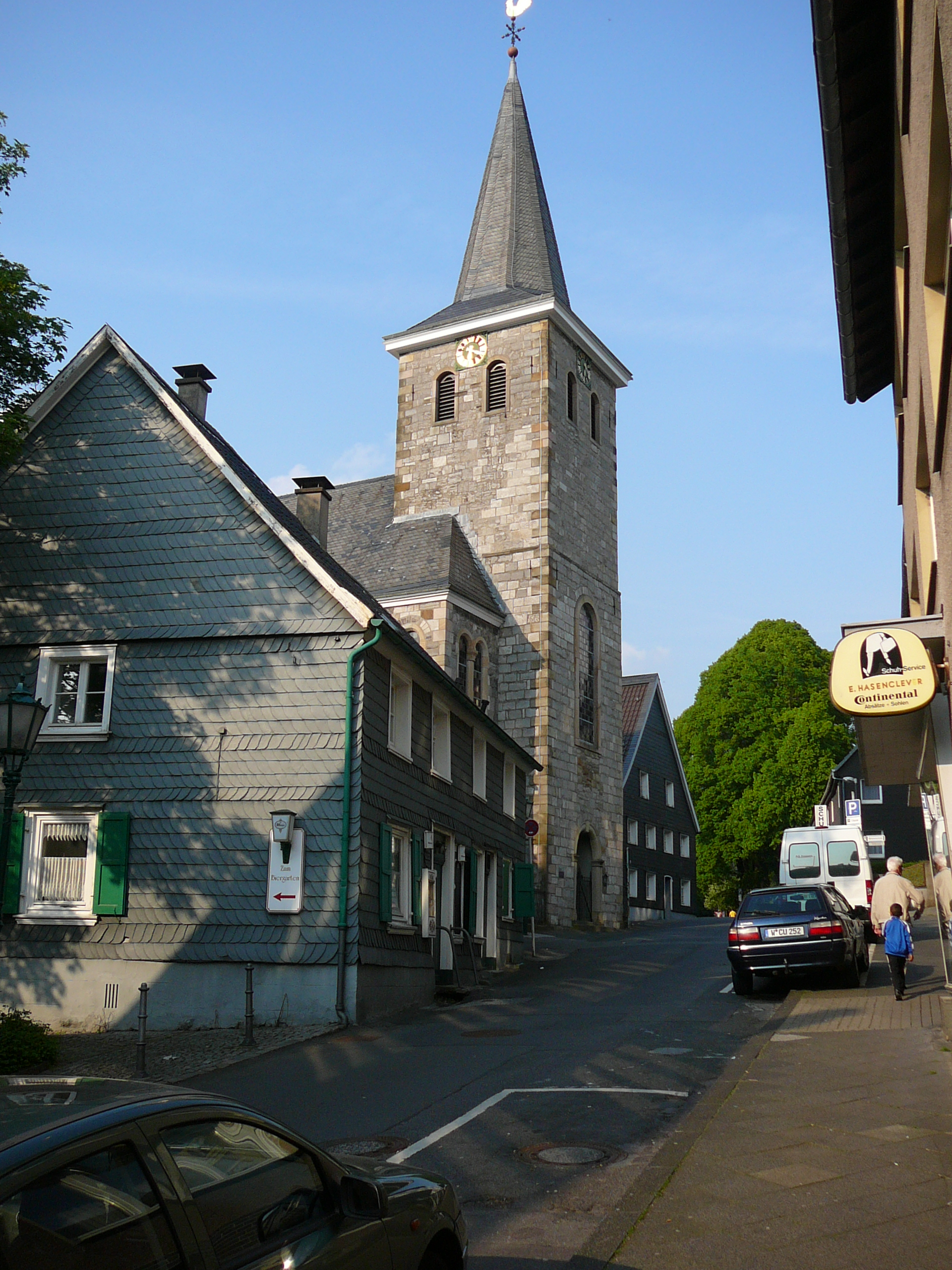
View from the Odoakerstraße

The Alte Kirche (Old Church) is a Protestant church in the district Langerfeld of Wuppertal. It is one of two churches of the Protestant congregation Langerfeld and is located between the Odoakerstraße (Odoacer street) and the Schwelmer Straße (Schwelm street). It was built from 1768 to 1786; the first service took place on 24 September 1786, and was celebrated to the memory of Frederick II of Prussia.

In 2015, when the congregation celebrated her 250th jubilee, the church was extensively renovated both in the inside and on the outside.
