= Franz Yaakov Orgler =

German athlete

Franz Yaakov Orgler (1914-2015) was a German-Jewish track and field athlete. He was selected to represent Germany at the 1936 Berlin Olympics, but was removed from the team because he was Jewish.

Orgler earned top awards at various Maccabiah games and was the Maccabiah record holder in the 1000m track event.

== Biography ==
=== Early life ===
Orgler was born to Kurt and Adele Orgler in Barmen, a town in Western Germany. The town later merged with other towns to form Wuppertal.

He had two sisters, Eva and Mary Louise, and a brother, Hans Joachim.

=== Athletic career ===
Orgler was the only Jewish member of the Black White Barmen, a municipal sports club. In 1933, he joined Hakoach sports club, a Jewish sports club based in Koln, and trained both clubs simultaneously.

Orgler ran the 400m and 800m events at the German Youth Championships and earned the Golden Needle Award from the German Sports Authority. In 1933, he joined the Zionist Maccabi Sports Union.

Orgler attended the German Olympic team's training camp in 1934 and was selected to compete for Germany in the 1936 Berlin Olympic games. The Nazi regime initially permitted Jewish athletes to complete on the team as a public relations technique.

Prior to the Olympic Games, Orgler competed in the 100m, 400m, 800m and 1000m racing events. He was also the German Maccabi champion in the 400m and 800m events. Orgler was expelled from the Black White Barmen for competing in the 1935 Maccabiah Games, an openly Jewish event. He was removed from the German Olympic Team soon after.

After removal from the Olympic team, Orgler founded the Hakoach Wuppertal sports club where he developed his own training program and organized tournaments.

Following the 1936 Berlin Olympics and the media attention that came with it, the Nazis ramped up their persecution of the Jews. Orgler escaped to Sweden in 1937, but returned to Germany in August of the same year to participate in the Berlin Maccabiah Games. He was able to return to Sweden despite run-ins with German Police.

Orgler was nearly deported to Denmark when his Swedish residency permit expired, but his local sports club, Hörby, was able to arrange a further residency in Sweden. Many Jewish athletes that were deported to Denmark were ultimately murdered by the Nazis.

Orgler became the sports coordinator for Maccabi Stockholm. He obtained the Maccabi world record in the 1000m event in 1946.

He became a Swedish citizen in 1947 and served in the Swedish Army. Orgler died in Sweden at the age of 100.

=== Family ===
Orgler's sister, Eva, moved to Italy in 1933. In 1939, his sister Mary Louise escaped Germany for Britain and his brother, Hans Joachim, joined him in Sweden. Orgler's parents, Kurt and Adele, were murdered in Auschwitz.
