= Polizeipräsidium Wuppertal =

Coordinates: 51°15′45″N 7°10′36″E

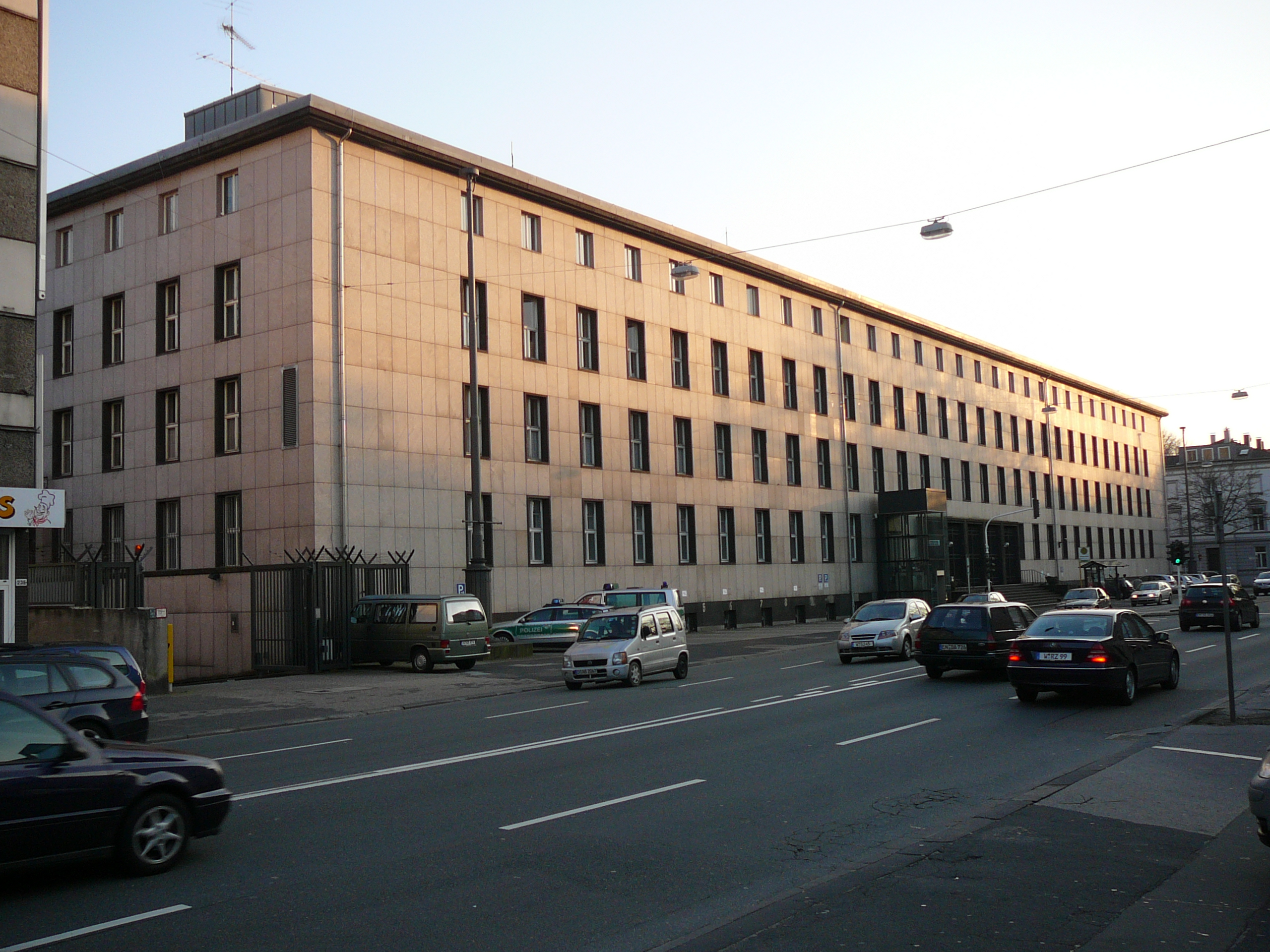
Polizeipräsidium Wuppertal

The Polizeipräsidium Wuppertal (Police Headquarters of Wuppertal) is a part of the North Rhine-Westphalia Police. The jurisdiction spans the cities of Wuppertal, Remscheid and Solingen. Head of authority is Polizeipräsident Markus Röhrl. Circa 1.800 officers and civil employees working at Police HQ Wuppertal.

== Building ==
It was built between 1937 and 1939 and used by the local police and the Gestapo since August 1939. After World War II the Allied Military Government used the building as headquarters, and later in 1945 it was also used by the Stadtrat (city council), because the city hall in Wuppertal-Barmen was destroyed by area bombing in May 1943.
