= Wuppertal =

- City
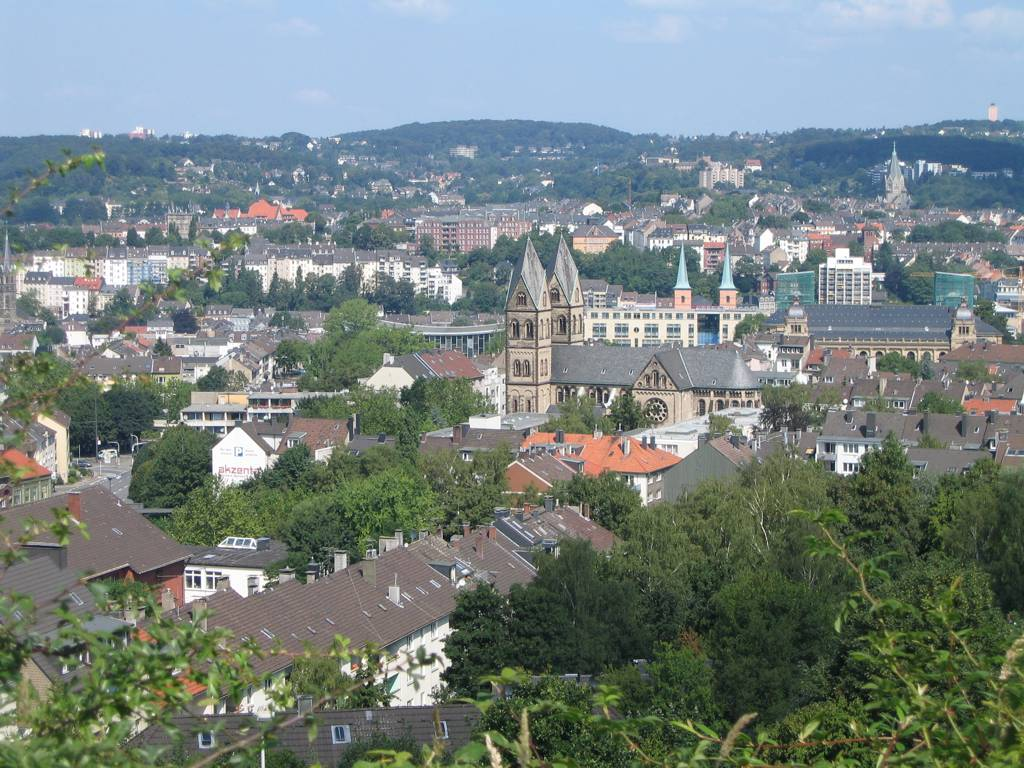
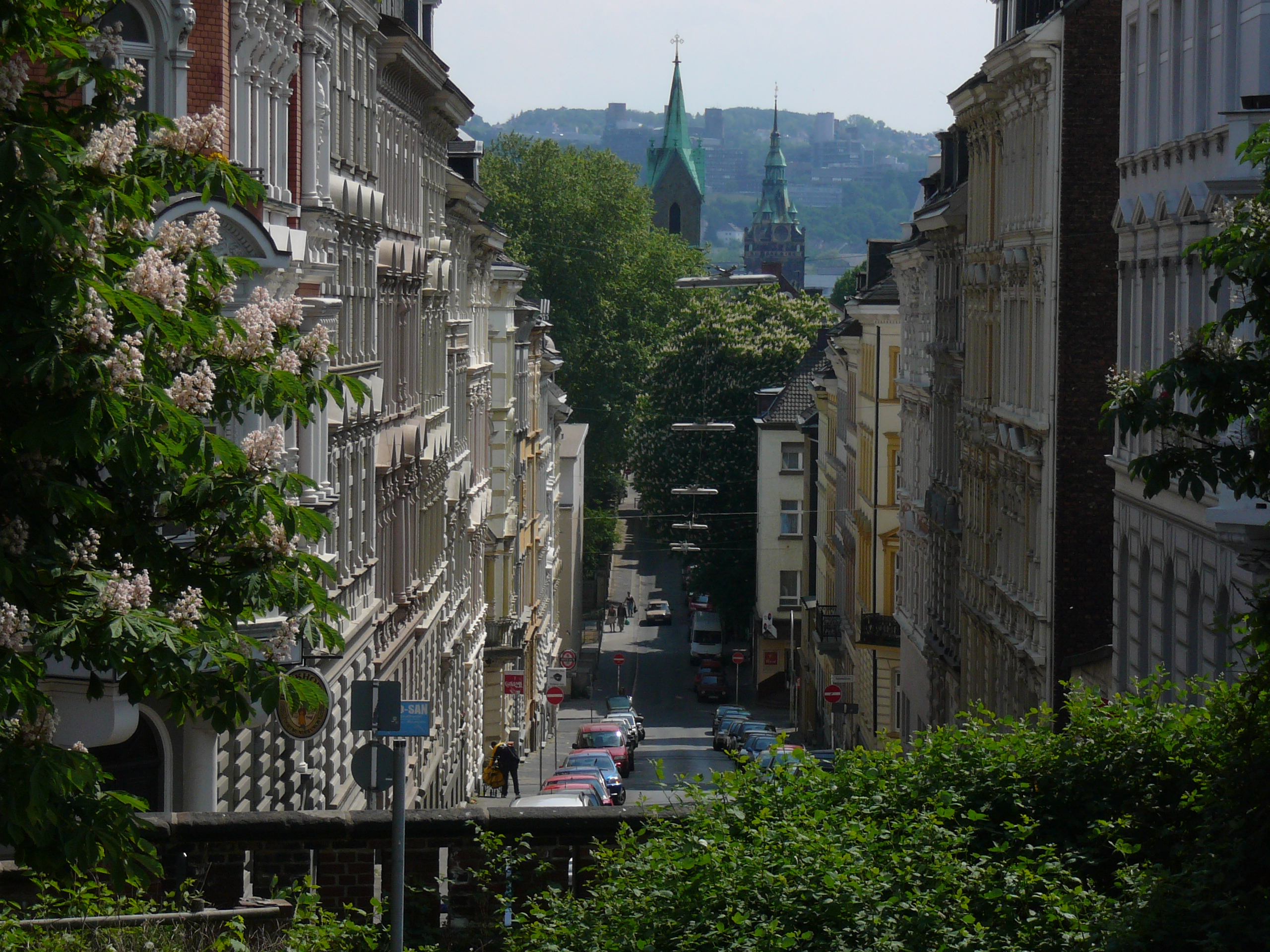
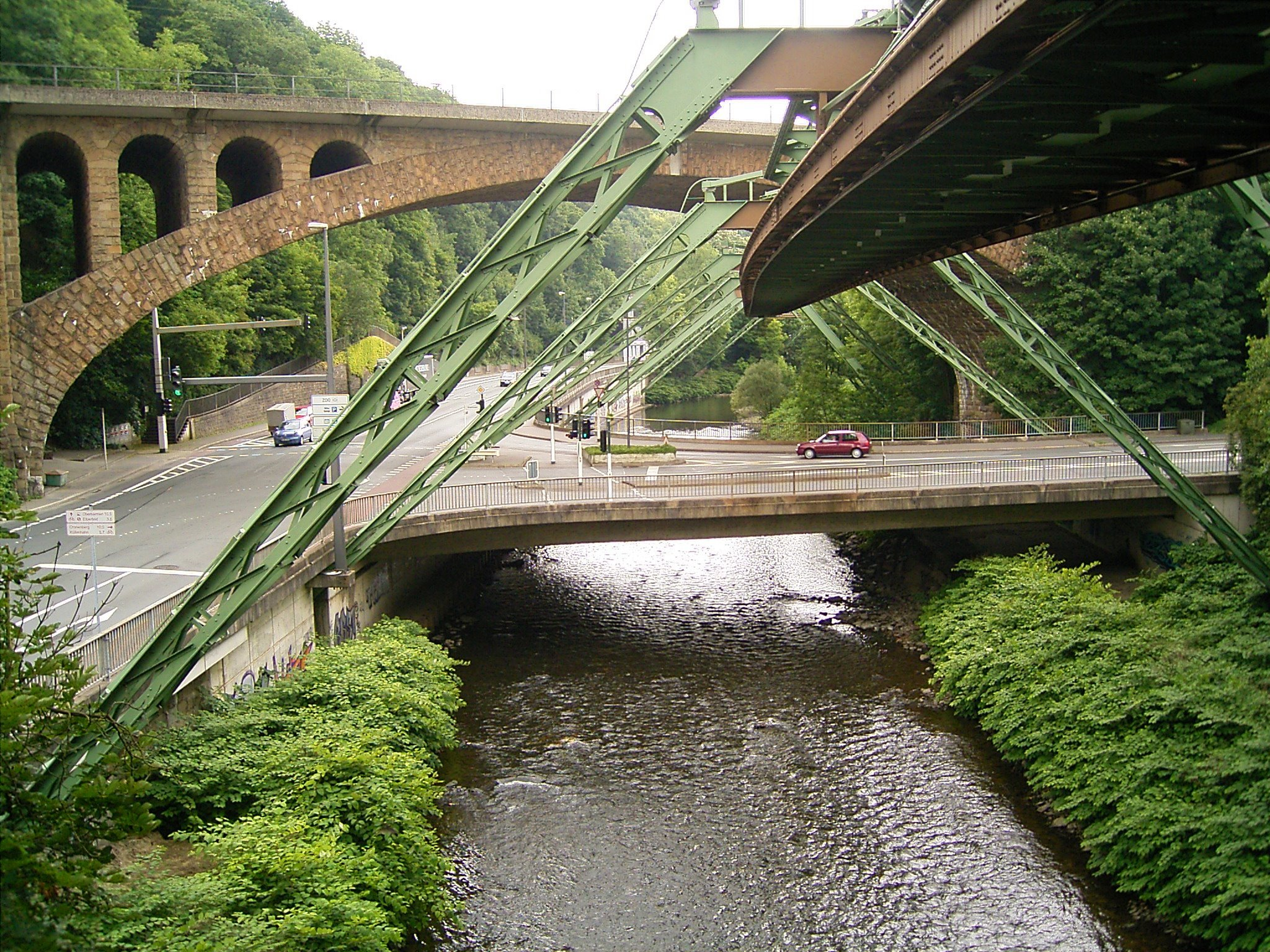
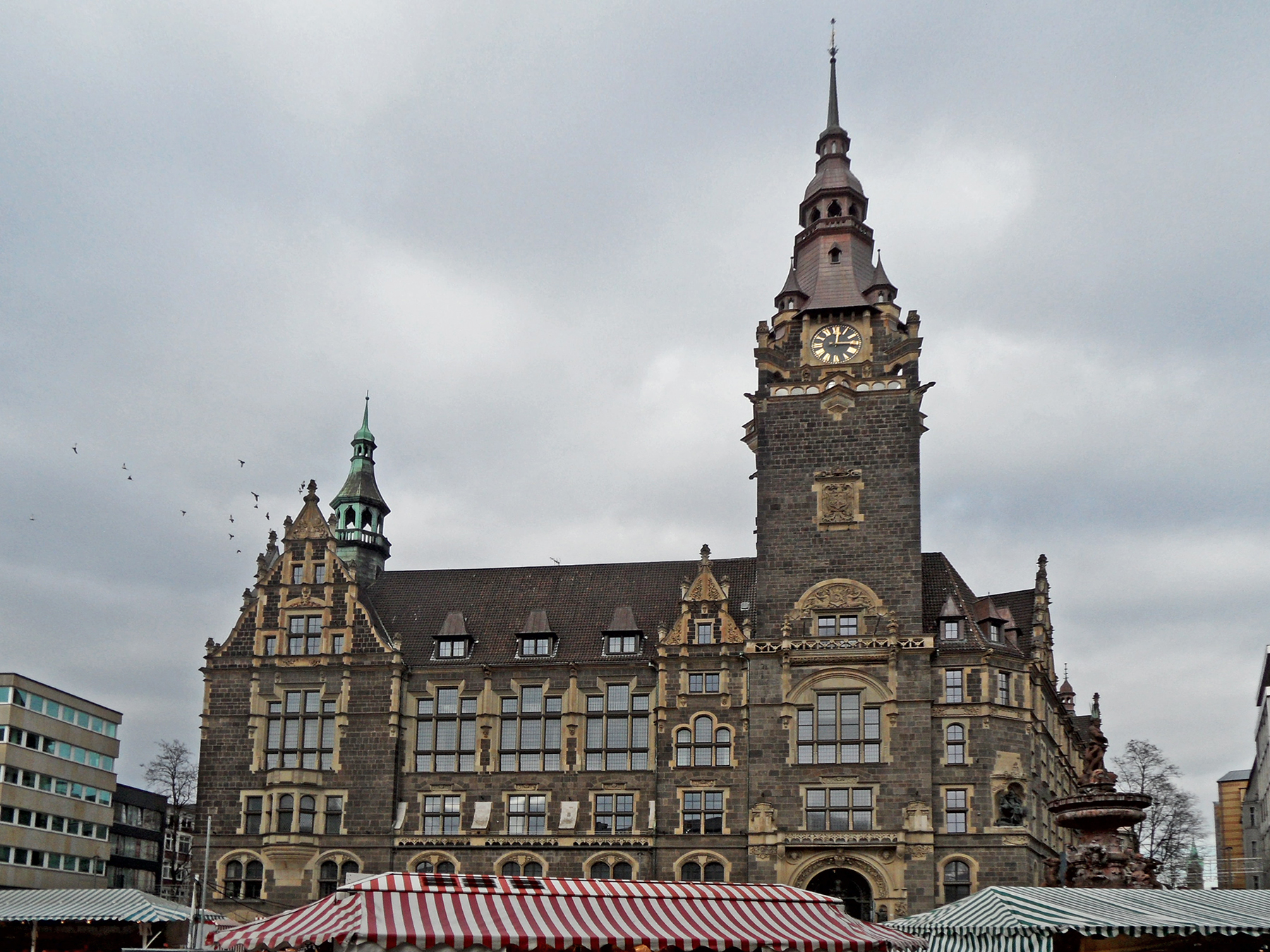
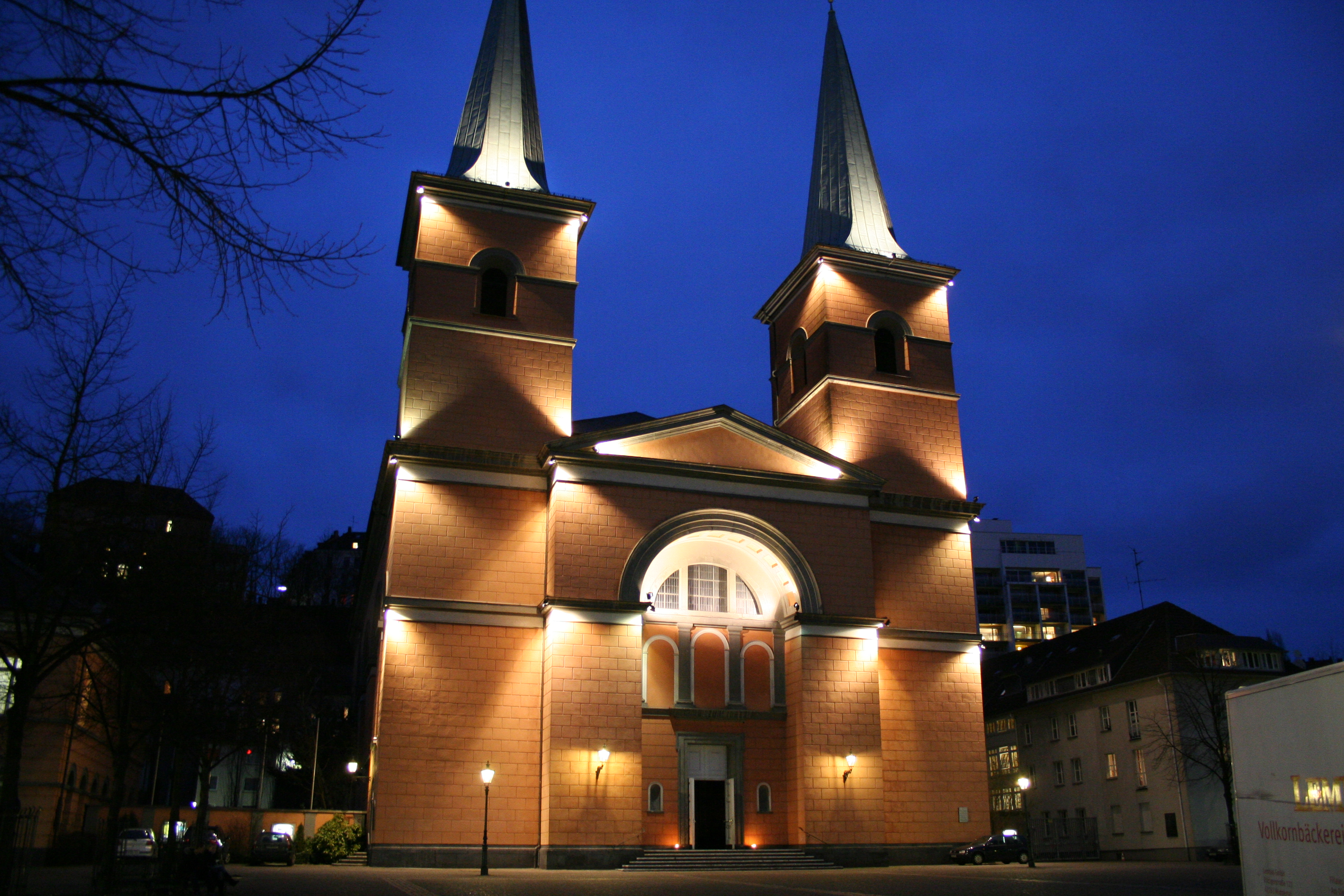
- View over Wuppertal-Elberfeld Friedrichstraße Wuppertal Suspension Railway beneath Sonnborn Railway Bridge The former town hall of the Elberfeld St Lawrence's Basilica

- Flag Coat of arms

- Wuppertal within North Rhine-Westphalia
- Interactive map of Wuppertal
- Location within Germany Location within North Rhine-Westphalia
- Coordinates: 51°16′N 07°11′E
- Country: Germany
- State: North Rhine-Westphalia
- Admin. region: Düsseldorf
- District: Urban district

Government
  - Mayor (2025-): Miriam Scherff (SPD)
  - Governing parties: SPD/ CDU

Area
  - City: 168.41 km^{2} (65.02 sq mi)
- Elevation: 100–350 m (330–1,150 ft)

Population (2025-12-31)
  - City: 357,243
  - Density: 2,121.3/km^{2} (5,494.1/sq mi)
  - Urban: 608,000 (Bergisches Dreieck)
  - Metro: 11,300,000 (Rhein-Ruhr)
- Time zone: UTC+01:00 (CET)
  - Summer (DST): UTC+02:00 (CEST)
- Postal codes: 42001-42399
- Dialling codes: 0202
- Vehicle registration: W
- Website: wuppertal.de

Wuppertal (German: [ˈvʊpɐtaːl]; lit. 'Wupper Dale') is a city in North Rhine-Westphalia, in western Germany, with a population of 355,000. Wuppertal is the seventh-largest city in North Rhine-Westphalia and 17th-largest in Germany. It was founded in 1929 by the merger of Elberfeld, Barmen, Ronsdorf, Cronenberg and Vohwinkel, and was initially called "Barmen-Elberfeld" before adopting its present name in 1930. It is the capital and largest city of the Bergisches Land.

The city straddles the densely populated banks of the River Wupper, a tributary of the Rhine. Wuppertal is located between the Ruhr area to the north, Düsseldorf to the west, and Cologne to the southwest, and over time has grown together with Solingen, Remscheid and Hagen. The city is known for its steep slopes, its woods and parks, and for being the greenest city in Germany, with two-thirds green space of the total municipal area.

The Wupper Valley was, along with the Ore Mountains and before the Ruhr, the first highly industrialized region of Germany, which resulted in the construction of the Wuppertal Suspension Railway in the then independent cities of Elberfeld and Barmen. The increasing demand for coal from the textile mills and blacksmith shops from those cities encouraged the expansion of the nearby Ruhr. Wuppertal still is a major industrial centre, being home to industries such as textiles, metallurgy, chemicals, pharmaceuticals, electronics, automobiles, rubber, vehicles and printing equipment. Aspirin originates from Wuppertal, patented in 1897 by Bayer, as does the Vorwerk Kobold vacuum cleaner. The Wuppertal Institute and the European Institute for International Economic Relations are located in the city. Barmen was the birthplace of Friedrich Engels.

Due to the city's length, the Bergish varieties of the Limburgish language called Platt are spoken in its western communities like Vohwinkel, but not in the city's eastern communities like Langerfeld where the Southern varieties of Westphalian language are spoken and the city is called Wupperdaal by locals.

== Geography ==
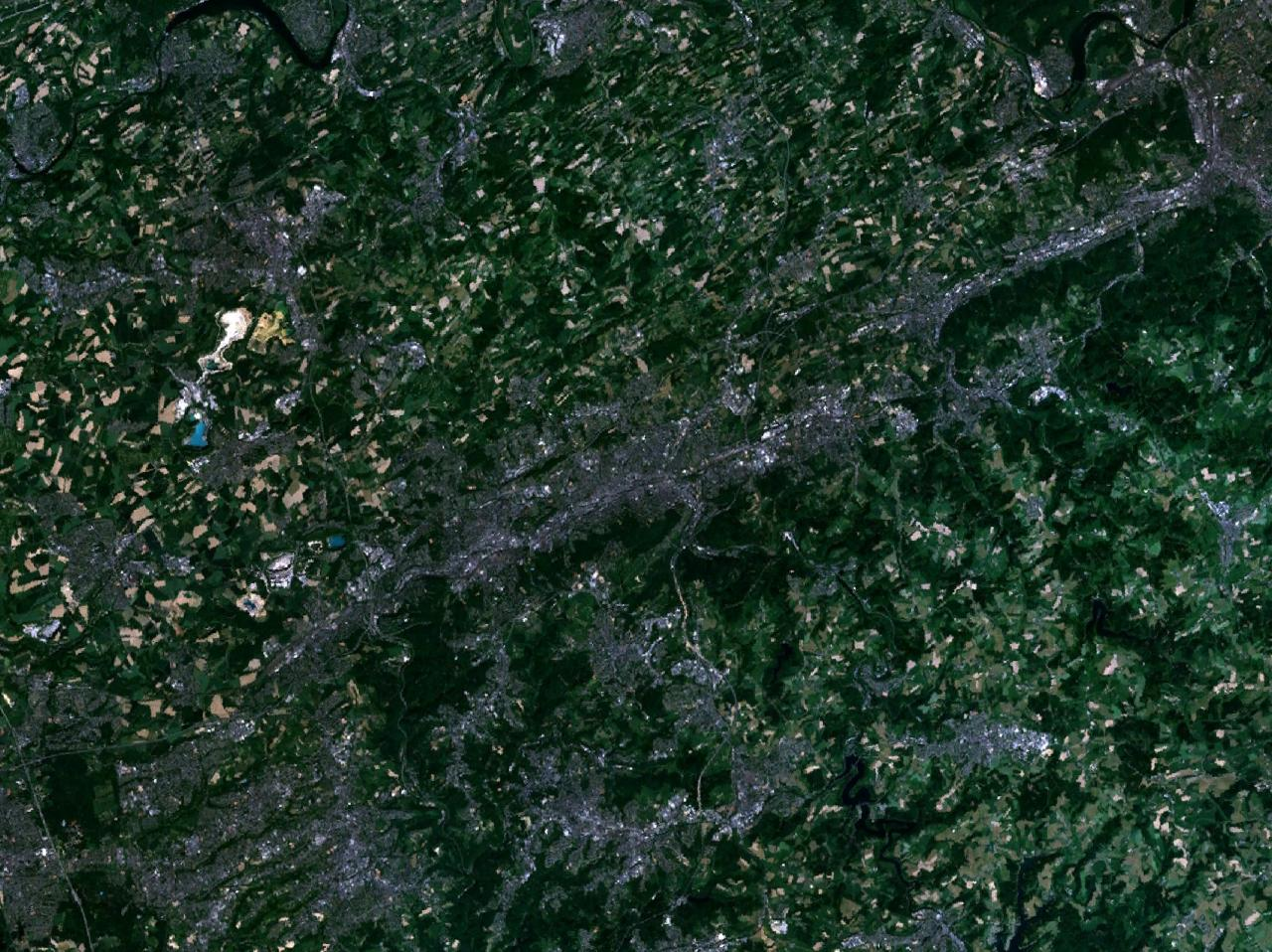
Wuppertal from space

Wuppertal is located in the Bergisches Land region of North Rhine-Westphalia. The city is situated in the valley of the Wupper river, which flows through the city from east to west and is a tributary of the Rhine. Wuppertal is characterised by its steep hills and narrow valleys, giving the city a distinctive topography.

Wuppertal spans an area of 168.41 square kilometers (65.02 sq mi), with elevations ranging from 100 meters (330 ft) above sea level in the river valleys to over 350 meters (1,150 ft) in the surrounding uplands. The highest point is the Lichtscheid hill at 350 meters (1,148 ft). Wuppertal is bordered by several municipalities, including Solingen, Remscheid, Hagen, and Ennepe-Ruhr-Kreis.

The city's unique geography led to the development of the Wuppertal Schwebebahn (Wuppertal Suspension Railway), an elevated monorail that follows the course of the Wupper river through much of the city. The surrounding landscape is marked by mixed forests, agricultural land, and numerous parks, including the Barmer Wald and the Botanischer Garten Wuppertal.

Wuppertal is part of the Rhine-Ruhr metropolitan region, one of the largest population centres in Europe.

== History ==
Population development

Wuppertal in its present borders was formed in 1929 by merging the industrial cities of Barmen and Elberfeld along with the communities of Vohwinkel, Ronsdorf, Cronenberg, Langerfeld and Beyenburg. The initial name Barmen-Elberfeld was changed in a 1930 referendum to Wuppertal ("Wupper Valley"). The new city was administered as part of Prussia's Rhine Province.

Uniquely for Germany, it is a "linear city", owing to the steep hillsides along the river Wupper. Its highest hill is the Lichtscheid, which is 351 m (1,152 ft) above sea level. The dominant urban centres Elberfeld (historic commercial centre) and Barmen (more industrial) have formed a continuous urbanized area since 1850. During the succeeding decades, "Wupper-Town" became the dominant industrial agglomeration of northwestern Germany. During the 20th century, this conurbation had been surpassed by Cologne, Düsseldorf and the Ruhr area, all with a more favourable topography.

From 5 July 1933 to 19 January 1934 the Kemna concentration camp was established in Wuppertal. It was one of the early Nazi concentration camps, created by the Nazi Party to incarcerate their political opponents upon gaining power in 1933. The camp was established in a former factory on the Wupper in the Kemna neighborhood of the Barmen part of Wuppertal. Protestant Christians opposed to the so called German Christians adopted the Barmen Declaration in Wuppertal in 1934.

By order of 10 October 1938, the 1st Light Division of the German Army was formed in Wuppertal, which in September 1939 took part in the invasion of Poland which started World War II. During the war, Nazi Germany operated a Nazi prison, two forced labour subcamps of the prison in Remscheid-Lüttringhausen and an SS construction brigade in the city. The prisoners of the SS construction brigade were Poles, Russians, French, Czechs, Romanians, Hungarians, and Greeks. About 40% of buildings in the city were destroyed by Allied bombing, as were many other German cities and industrial centres (see Bombing of Wuppertal in World War II). However, a large number of historic sites have been preserved, such as:

- Ölberg, literally "Oil mountain", Germany's largest original working class district, is protected as a historic monument. The name came about during the 1920s as the district continued using oil lamps while the surrounding bourgeois residential quarters were electrified. In traditional use, the name "Ölberg" refers to the Mount of Olives in Jerusalem.
- Brill is one of Germany's largest districts of Gründerzeit villas, i.e. middle class mansions built by industrial entrepreneurs during the second half of the 19th century.

The US 78th Infantry Division under Major General Edwin P. Parker Jr. captured Wuppertal against scant resistance on 16 April 1945. Wuppertal became a part of the British Zone of Occupation, and subsequently part of the new state of North Rhine-Westphalia in West Germany.

== Population ==
Historical population

Year	Pop.	±% p.a.
1610	2,500	—
1800	12,000	+0.83%
1822	23,758	+3.15%
1852	39,944	+1.75%
1871	71,384	+3.10%
1885	106,499	+2.90%
1900	156,966	+2.62%
1910	170,195	+0.81%
1919	157,218	−0.88%
1925	167,025	+1.01%
1929	414,951	+25.55%
1933	408,602	−0.38%
1939	401,672	−0.28%
1946	325,846	−2.94%
1950	363,224	+2.75%

Year	Pop.	±% p.a.
1961	420,711	+1.34%
1965	430,737	+0.59%
1970	424,695	−0.28%
1975	405,375	−0.93%
1980	393,388	−0.60%
1985	376,586	−0.87%
1990	383,660	+0.37%
1995	381,884	−0.09%
2000	366,434	−0.82%
2005	359,237	−0.40%
2010	349,721	−0.54%
2015	350,046	+0.02%
2020	355,004	+0.28%
2025	357,243	+0.13%

Population size may be affected by changes in administrative divisions. Source: Landesdatabank Nordrhein-Westfalen (1965-2025)

Wuppertal currently has a population of about 355,000. The number of inhabitants more than doubled in 1929 as a result of the Barmen–Elberfeld merger. The economic boom of the 1950s and 60s saw the establishment of new industry headquarters and with it an influx of workers, including migrant workers from Turkey, Greece and Italy. Population numbers during these times of as-yet unparalleled growth peaked at about 423,000 in 1963; in the 1970s, a period of steady decline followed in the wake of industrial losses.

As of 31 December 2022, the largest groups of foreign residents were:

From country	Number of residents
Turkey	11,575
Syria	7,415
Italy	6,870
Greece	6,130
Poland	5,870
Ukraine	5,387
Romania	2,835
Morocco	2,463
Serbia	2,197
North Macedonia	1,724
Iraq	1,593
Spain	1,439
Russia	1,354
Croatia	1,273
Netherlands	1,228
Kosovo	1,147

== Main sights ==
In total, Wuppertal possesses over 4,500 buildings classified as national monuments, most exemplifying styles such as Neoclassicism, Eclecticism, Historicism, Art Nouveau/Jugendstil and Bauhaus. The American TV station CNN recommended Wuppertal as one of 20 places worldwide to visit in the year 2020 because of the Schwebebahn, the architectural diversity and the Nordbahntrasse, a 22-kilometre (14 mi) cycle route across the city 2020. In 2031, Wuppertal will host the Federal Horticultural Show 2031.

Main sights include:

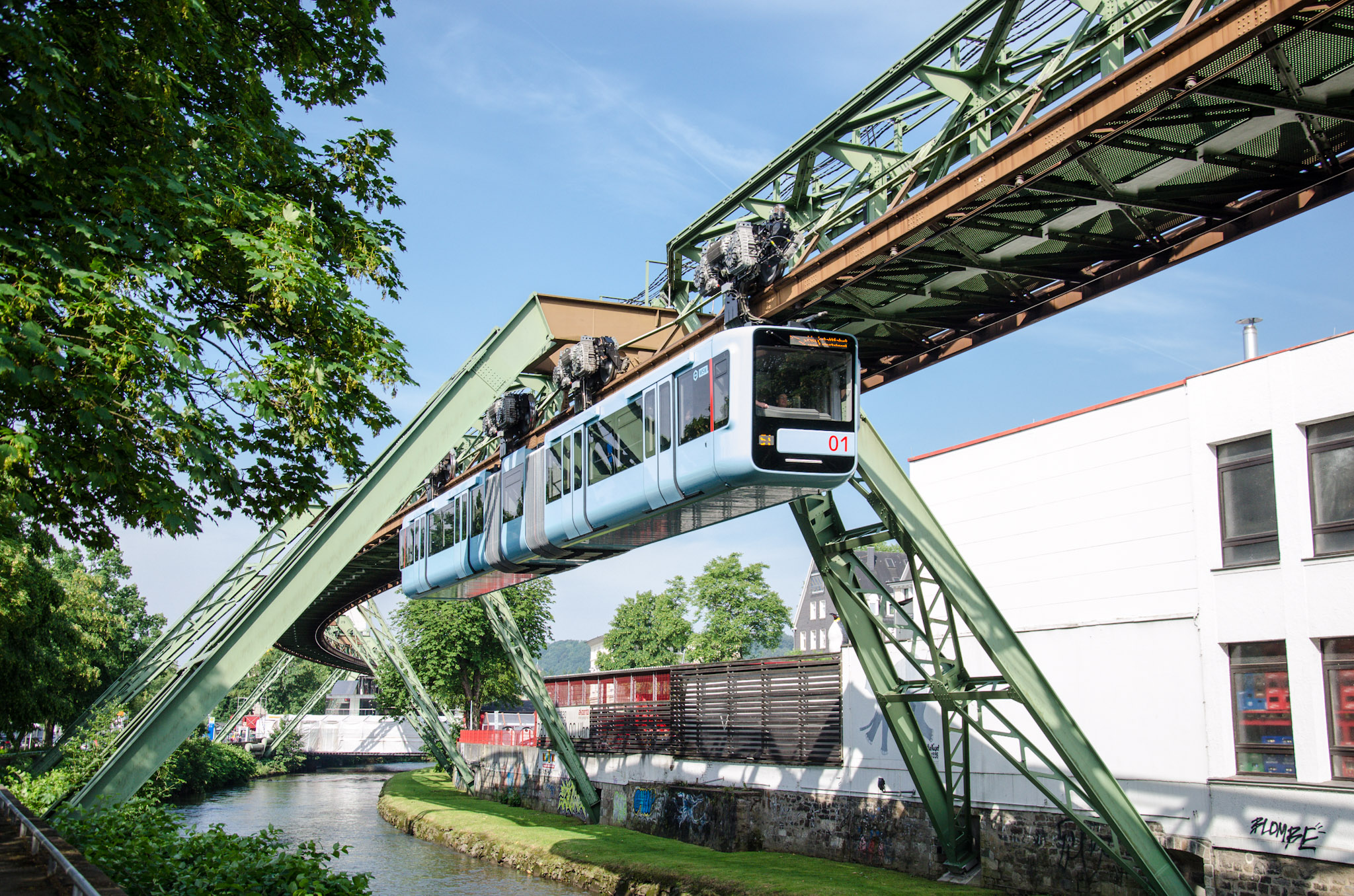
The Schwebebahn floating tram

- Schwebebahn or floating tram. One of the city's greatest attractions is the globally unique suspended monorail Wuppertaler Schwebebahn, which was established in 1901. The tracks are 8 m (26 ft) above the streets and 12 m (40 ft) above the Wupper.
- Wuppertaler Schwebebahn Kaiserwagen A guided tour of the suspension railway in a special tram.
- Wuppertal Opera (Opernhaus Wuppertal).

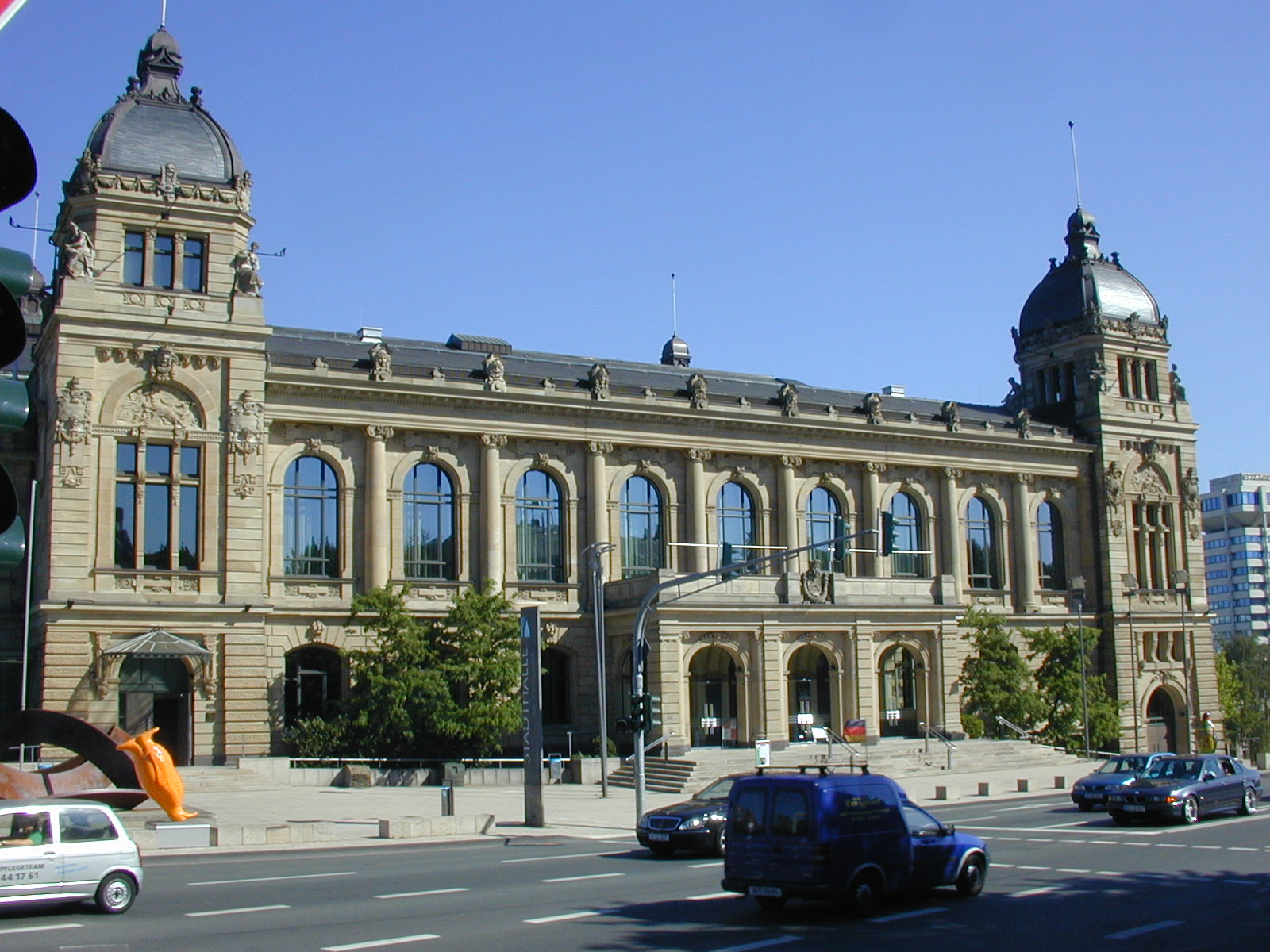
Concert Hall (Stadthalle) Wuppertal

- Concerthall Stadthalle, a fine piece of turn-of-the-century architecture with outstanding acoustics. Home of the Wuppertal Symphony Orchestra (Sinfonieorchester Wuppertal) (Stadthalle).
- Wuppertal Dance Theatre (Tanztheater Wuppertal), a world-famous centre of modern dance founded by the choreographer Pina Bausch.
- Engels-Haus, 18th century-architecturally typical of the region, it houses a permanent display of materials associated with the co-founder of modern Communism, Friedrich Engels.
- Wuppertal Zoo, a large, nicely landscaped zoo.
- Botanischer Garten Wuppertal, a municipal botanical garden.
- Arboretum Burgholz, an extensive arboretum.
- Von der Heydt Museum is an important art gallery with works from the 17th century to the present time. The first of Picasso's works that ever appeared in public was displayed here.
- Skulpturenpark Waldfrieden, a sculpture park with exhibition hall, founded by sculptor Tony Cragg.
- Alte Kirche (Wuppertal-Langerfeld), 18th-century Protestant church

== Education ==
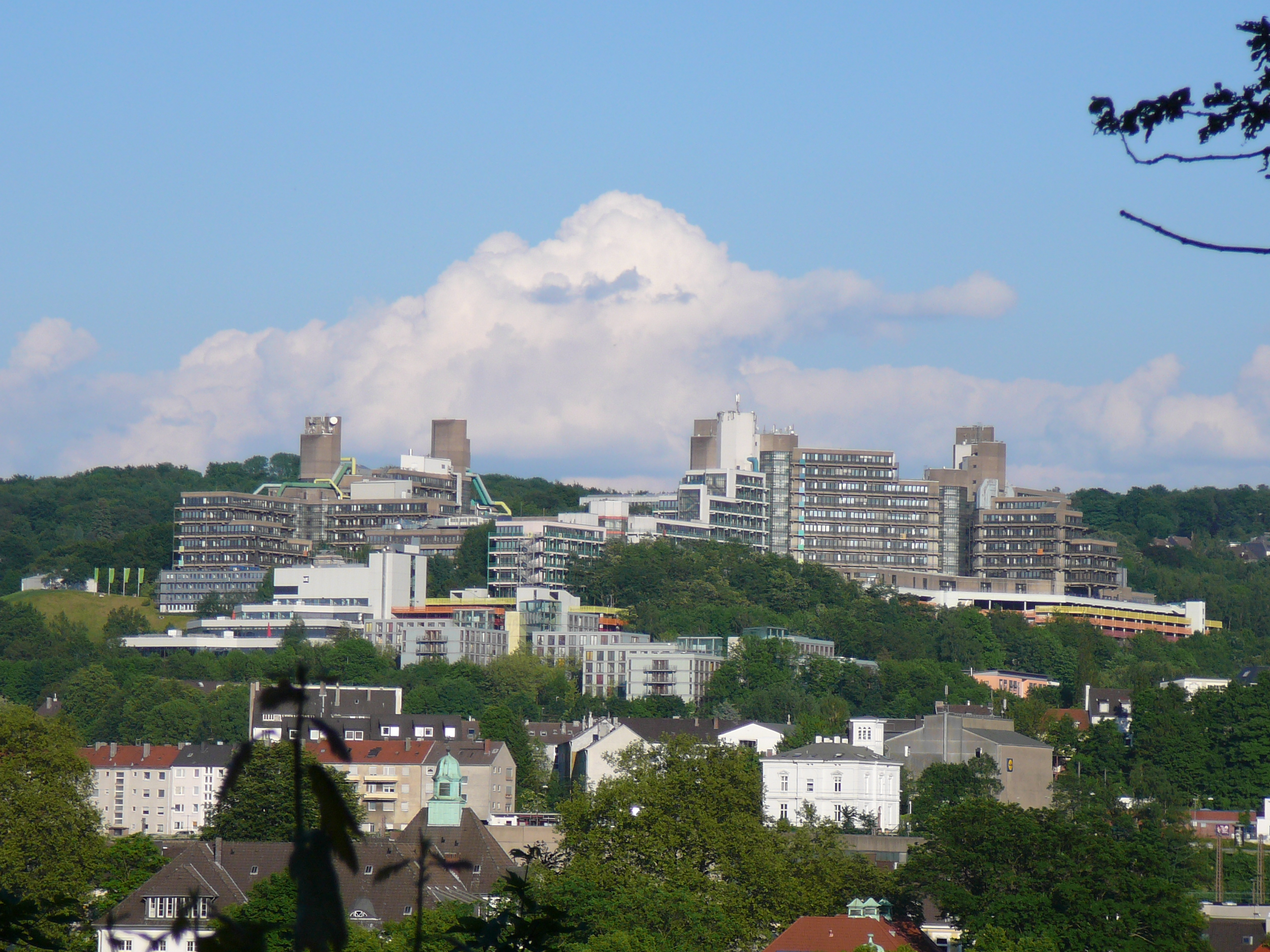
Wuppertal University

Four institutions of higher education are in Wuppertal.

- University of Wuppertal (Bergische Universität Wuppertal)
- FOM University of Applied Sciences
- Cologne University of Music, section Wuppertal
- College of Theology, Wuppertal/Bethel (Theologische Zentrum Wuppertal)

The privately financed Junior Uni is a German initiative to educate youth from the age of 4 to 18 in science outside the school program.

== Politics ==
Results of the second round of the 2025 mayoral election

Results of the 2025 city council election

=== Mayor ===
The most recent mayoral election was held on 14 September 2025, with a runoff held on 28 September and Miriam Scherff of the SPD was elected to the post. The results of the election were as follows:

Candidate	Party	First round		Second round	
Candidate	Party	Votes	%	Votes	%
Miriam Scherff	Social Democratic Party	41,595	33.3	65,142	74.6
Matthias Nocke	CDU	29,185	23.4	22,164	25.4
Hartmut Beucker	Alternative for Germany	20,494	16.4		
Dagmar Liste-Frinker	Greens	9,363	7.5		
Salvador Oberhaus	The Left	7,765	6.2		
Marcel Hafke	Free Democratic Party	6,085	4.9		
Guido Gallenkamp	Independent	2,842	2.3		
Susanne Herhaus	Sahra Wagenknecht Alliance	2,657	2.1		
Henrik Dahlmann	Voters' Association for Wuppertal/Free Voters	1,896	1.5		
Mira Lehner	Die PARTEI	1,465	1.2		
Selly Wane	Strong and colorful-Together for Wuppertal	1,419	1.1		
Valid votes		124,766	98.8	87,306	98.9
Invalid votes		1,501	1.2	950	1.1
Total		126,267	100.0	88,256	100.0
Electorate/voter turnout		254,358	49.6	254,358	34.7
Source: City of Wuppertal

=== City council ===
The Wuppertal city council governs the city alongside the mayor. The most recent city council election was held on 14 September 2025, and the results were as follows:

Party	Votes	%	±	Seats	±
Social Democratic Party (SPD)	35,884	28.8	▼0.1	24	▲1
Christian Democratic Union (CDU)	27,649	22.2	▼2.0	18	▼2
Alternative for Germany (AfD)	21,386	17.1	▲11.0	14	▲9
Alliance 90/The Greens (Grüne)	14,249	11.4	▼8.2	9	▼7
The Left (Die Linke)	10,511	8.4	New	7	New
Free Democratic Party (FDP)	5,282	4.2	▼3.0	3	▼3
Sahra Wagenknecht Alliance (BSW)	3,128	2.5	New	2	New
Voters' Association for Wuppertal/Free Voters (WfW/FW)	2,181	1.7	▼1.2	1	▼1
Die PARTEI (PARTEI)	1,728	1.4	▼1.3	1	▼1
Strong and colorful-Together for Wuppertal (GfW)	1,293	1.0	New	1	New
Volt Germany (Volt)	365	0.3	New	0	New
Democratic Alliance for Diversity and Awakening (DAVA)	383	0.3	New	0	New
Grassroots Democratic Party of Germany (dieBasis)	280	0.2	New	0	New
Gathe for all	224	0.2	New	0	New
Valid votes	124,720	99.2			
Invalid votes	963	0.8			
Total	125,683	100.0		80	±0
Electorate/voter turnout	254,358	49.4	▲2.5		
Source: City of Wuppertal

== Transport ==
=== Railways ===
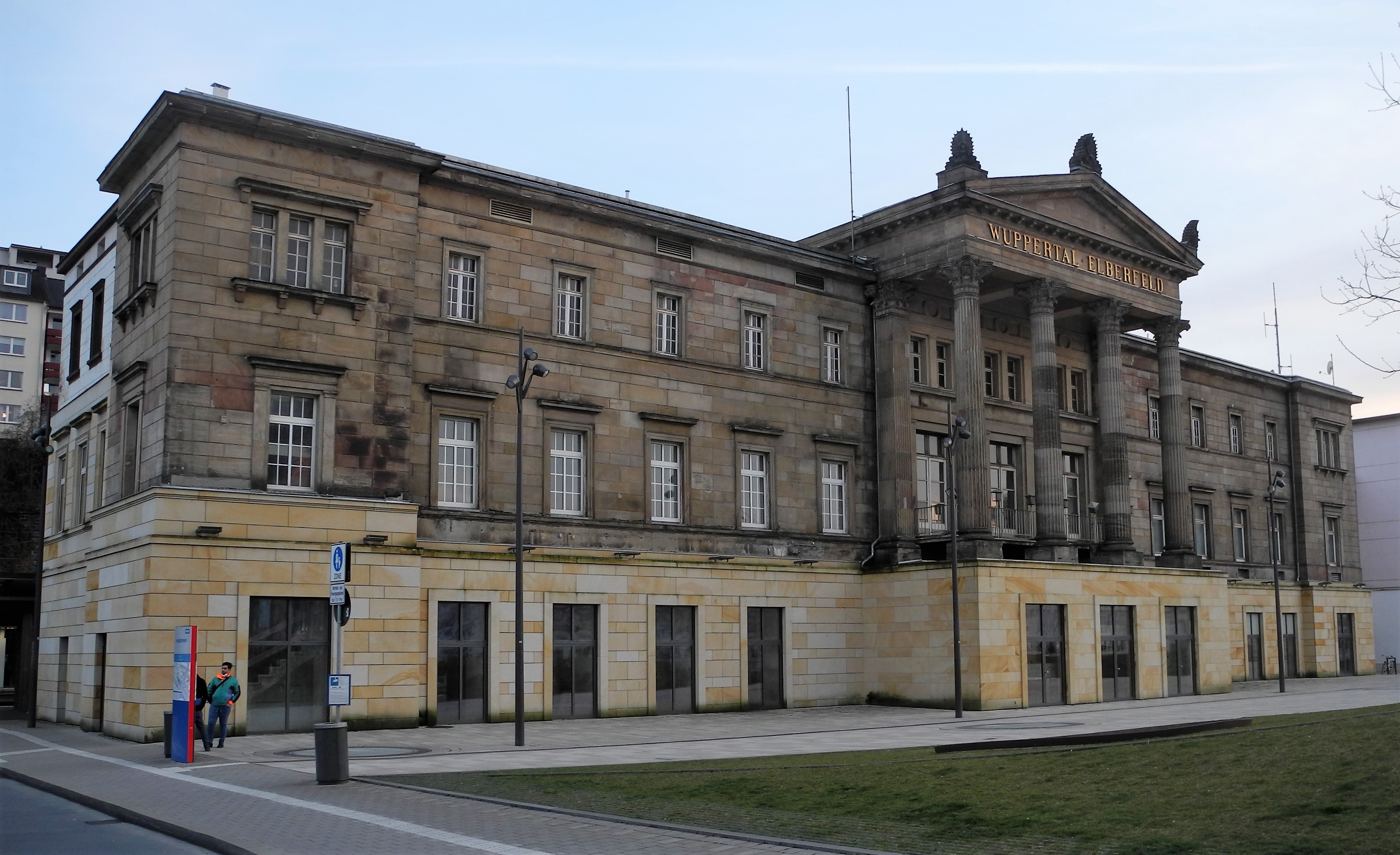
Central Station

Wuppertal is well connected to the rail network. The town lies on the Cologne–Hagen and the Düsseldorf–Hagen railway lines, and is a stop for long-distance traffic. The central station is located in the district of Elberfeld. Regionalbahn trains and some Regional-Express trains also stop at Oberbarmen, Barmen, Ronsdorf and Vohwinkel. There are also S-Bahn stations in Langerfeld, Unterbarmen, Steinbeck, Zoologischer Garten and Sonnborn.

The rail services that operate on the mainline through the valley are the RE 4 (Wupper-Express), RE 7 (Rhein-Münsterland-Express), RE 13 (Maas-Wupper-Express), RB 48 (Rhein-Wupper Bahn) and four Rhine-Ruhr S-Bahn services: the S 7, S 8, S 9 and S 68 (peak hours only). Every 30 minutes, it is served by a long-distance (Intercity-Express, InterCity, EuroCity) service in each direction.

With the exception of the line from Wuppertal to Solingen (operated as the S 7) and the Prince William Railway to Essen (now S-Bahn line S 9), all of the branch lines connecting to main line in the city of Wuppertal are now closed. This includes, among others, the Düsseldorf-Derendorf–Dortmund Süd railway (the Wuppertaler Nordbahn), the Burgholz Railway, the Wuppertal-Wichlinghausen–Hattingen railway, the Wupper Valley Railway and the Corkscrew Railway. Thus, there were once 31 stations in the Wuppertal area, including nine stations on the mainline. Nowadays only ten are serviced any more.

Wuppertal Hauptbahnhof is the location of the lost luggage services for Deutsche Bahn.

The Wuppertal Suspension Railway, a suspended monorail, serves the city and its surroundings. It has operated since 1901. In 1950, a young elephant named Tuffi was put aboard the Wuppertal Schwebebahn (monorail), as a promotion for the Althoff Circus. The swinging tram upset the elephant, and she trumpeted, charged, and plummeted 12 m (40 ft) into the river below. Tuffi suffered minor injuries; she lived until 1989. In 1999, the Schwebebahn had its thus far only fatal accident. New cars were added beginning in December 2016.

Between 1873 and 1987, Wuppertal was served by its own tram network.

=== Air ===
The city is served by Düsseldorf Airport, located 40 km (25 mi) northwest of Wuppertal.

== Sports ==
=== Association football ===
In football, Wuppertal's most popular club is Wuppertaler SV which currently play in the Oberliga Niederrhein, the fifth tier of the German football league system. Playing their home games at the city's Stadion am Zoo, the club, which enjoyed its last season in a nationwide division during the 2009–10 season, looks back on a rich and eventful history since its establishment as the result of a 1954 merger between the two main Wuppertal clubs SSV 04 Wuppertal and TSG Vohwinkel 80. The club spent a total of seven seasons in the top flight of German football, three of which in the Bundesliga, which they were promoted to during 1972. In their first season in the nationwide first division, the club reached a remarkable fourth place and qualified for the UEFA Cup for the first and only time in its history. After a first-round defeat by Polish side Ruch Chorzów and another two widely unsuccessful Bundesliga campaigns, the club disappeared from the top flight again, though, and has yet to return.

During 2004, the club merged with local rivals SV Borussia Wuppertal to form Wuppertaler SV Borussia, though the name change remained the only visible attribute of the merger with the club's colours and crest remaining unaltered. The additional "Borussia" was scrapped again during 2013 due to fans' demand amidst a change of leadership which was brought about to lead the club through necessary insolvency proceedings which have been completed as of September 2014.

Another noteworthy Wuppertal football club is Cronenberger SC from the district of Cronenberg. Their greatest success to date is reaching the 1952 German amateur football championship final which they lost 5–2 against VfR Schwenningen. Today, they play one tier below WSV in the Oberliga Nordrhein.

Famous players include Günter Pröpper who scored 39 of WSV's 136 Bundesliga goals and West Germany international Horst Szymaniak, as well as Cronenberg's Herbert Jäger who represented Germany at the 1952 Summer Olympics in Helsinki during his stay with the club.

=== Team handball ===
In handball, Wuppertal's most successful team is Bergischer HC, playing in the top-tier Handball-Bundesliga which they were promoted to for the second time during 2013, reaching 15th place during the 2013–14 campaign and therefore staying among the top scorers for a second consecutive season. BHC originates from a 2006 cooperation between the management, squad and main sponsor of LTV Wuppertal and rivals SG Solingen from the nearby city of the same name. The club advertises itself as a representative of the entire Bergisches Land region. The team plays its home games at Wuppertal's Uni-Halle (3,200 seats).

Wuppertal's past most successful club are the aforementioned LTV Wuppertal. LTV spent most of their seasons in the second and third tiers, before they merged with Wuppertaler SV's handball section in 1996 to form HSG LTV/WSV Wuppertal. The handball combination was promoted to the Bundesliga after its inaugural season, finishing 8th before dissolving again in 1998. However, the mere departure of Wuppertaler SV still allowed LTV Wuppertal, whose professional team were renamed HC Wuppertal, to play another three seasons in the Bundesliga before returning to the 2nd division and re-introducing its old name. After the establishment of BHC in 2006, LTV lost its financial base and was relegated several times, currently playing in the fifth-tier Verbandsliga.

=== Volleyball ===
In volleyball, SV Bayer Wuppertal was one of Germany's leading men's teams for many years during the 1990s and 2000s. The team was part of the well-known mass-sports club originating in Leverkusen and was promoted to the Bundesliga in 1978. Reacting to low attendances, the eponymous Bayer AG decided to relocate the volleyball team to Wuppertal in 1992, where there also was a Bayer-funded club. After the move, the club won various titles, including the German championship in 1994 and 1997 and the German Cup in 1995. In addition to that, they finished runners-up to Greek side Olympiacos S.C. in the 1995–96 European Cup Winners' Cup, losing the final in five sets.

After the wide-reaching retreat of Bayer AG from less popular professional sport during 2008, the club acquired the name Wuppertal Titans and later A!B!C Titans Berg. Land. However, the loss of their main sponsor eventually resulted in the team having to terminate during 2012. Presently, they once more play by the name of Bayer Wuppertal in the third-tier Regionalliga, unable to promote with their current financial set-up.

=== Basketball ===
Perhaps one of the most successful Wuppertal sports clubs was the women's basketball team of Barmer TV (known as BTV Wuppertal between 1994 and 2000, BTV Gold-Zack Wuppertal between 2000 and 2002 and Wuppertal Wings internationally). An 11-time German champion and 12-time German Cup winner, they won a remarkable ten consecutive doubles between 1993 and 2002. During 1996, they even won the European Cup as the first and so far only German side, beating Italy's SFT Como in the final. A year later, they narrowly missed out on back-to-back trebles, losing to French side CJM Bourges in the newly christened EuroLeague's final.

In 2002, the club withdrew from the Bundesliga due to financial troubles, their then-main sponsor Gold-Zack Werke filing for insolvency a year later. After a decade-long stay in amateur divisions, Barmer TV returned to the second-tier 2nd Bundesliga North in 2014.

Wuppertal co-hosted the 1998 FIBA World Championship for Women as one of seven host cities.

=== Roller hockey ===
In roller hockey, Wuppertal club RSC Cronenberg are one of the most successful German teams, having won the German championship and the German Cup in both men's and women's competitions. In total, the men won 13 German championships and nine cups, the women ten championships and nine cups. Both teams play their home games at Alfred-Henckels-Halle.

Wuppertal hosted several international tournaments, including the World Championship in 1997 (men) and 2004 (women) and the European Championship in 1992, 2010 (men) and 2011 (women).

== Wuppertal in the arts ==
- In the 1974 Wim Wenders movie Alice in the Cities, the main characters visit Wuppertal.
- Part of the action of Le Feu de Wotan (1984) of the comic book Yoko Tsuno series by Roger Leloup take place in Wuppertal and its Schwebebahn.
- The play Die Wupper by Else Lasker-Schüler is set in Elberfeld.
- The 2000 movie The Princess and the Warrior, by Tom Tykwer, was filmed in Wuppertal.
- The 2001 movie No Regrets, by Benjamin Quabeck, was filmed in Wuppertal.
- In the 2011 movie Pina, several of the dance sequences take place in and around Wuppertal. In several sequences, the elevated tram is used as a setting, as well as a backdrop.

== Twin towns – sister cities ==
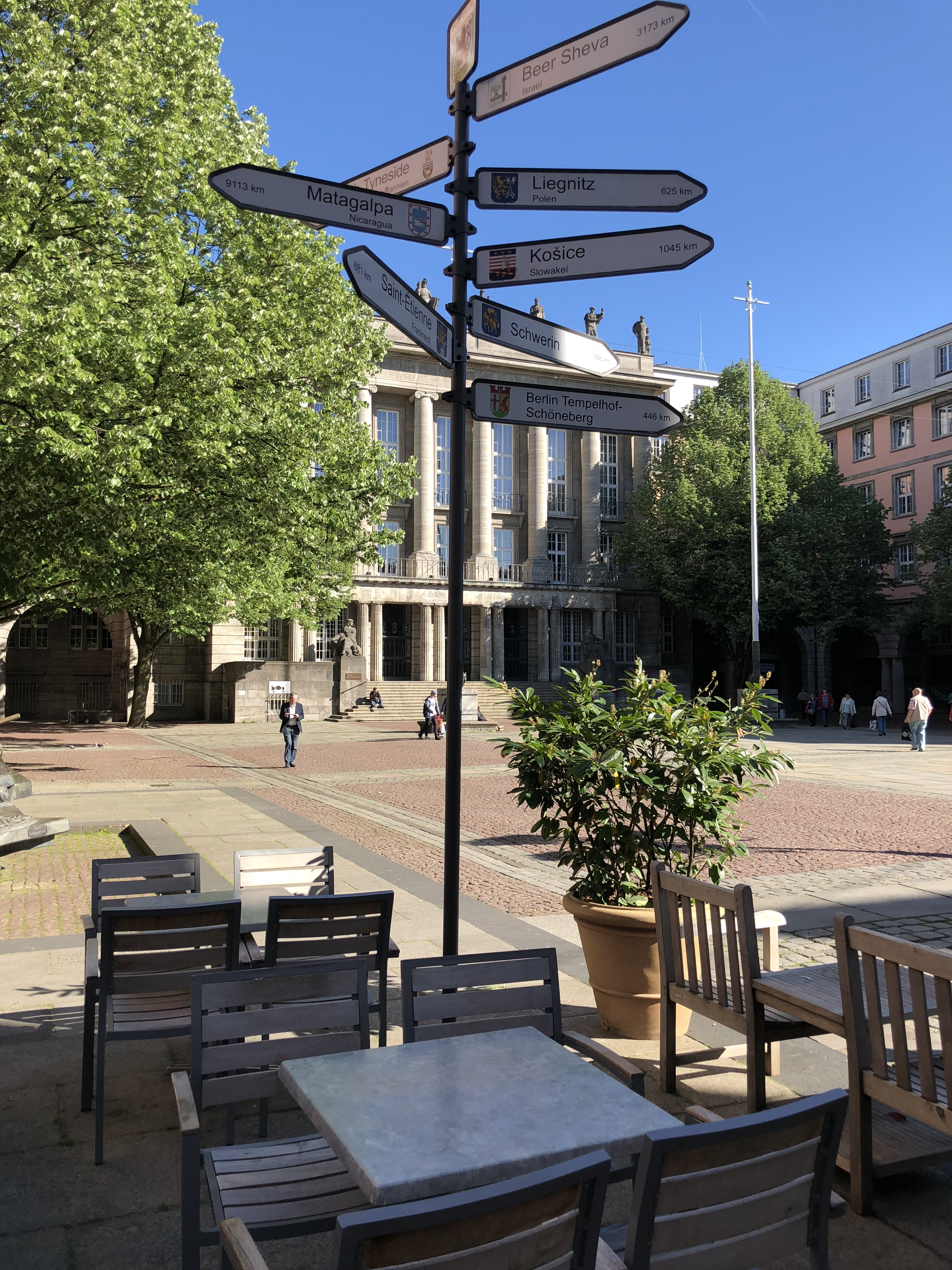
Signpost with twin towns

Wuppertal is twinned with:

- South Tyneside, England, United Kingdom (1951)
- Saint-Étienne, France (1960)
- Tempelhof-Schöneberg (Berlin), Germany (1964)
- Beersheba, Israel (1977)
- Košice, Slovakia (1980)
- Schwerin, Germany (1987)
- Matagalpa, Nicaragua (1987)
- Legnica, Poland (1993)
- Kamianske, Ukraine (2025)

=== Sister suspension railway ===
- Shonan Monorail, Japan

The Wuppertal Suspension Railway is twinned with Shonan Monorail since 2018. The Shonan Monorail is located in Kanagawa, Japan and connects the cities between Kamakura and Fujisawa. Both suspended railways made a campaign of their twinning in 2018.

== Notable people ==
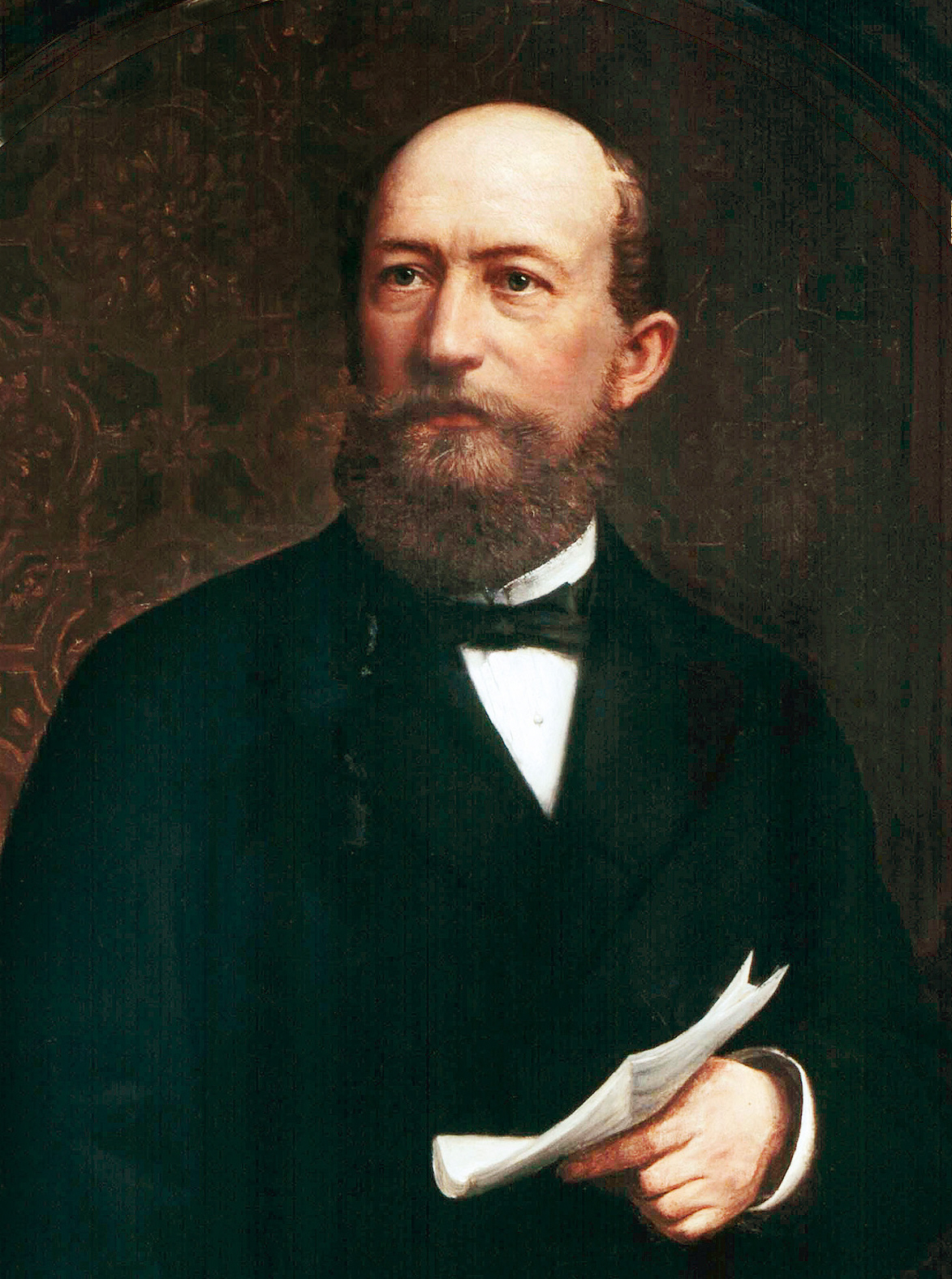
Friedrich Bayer, 1863

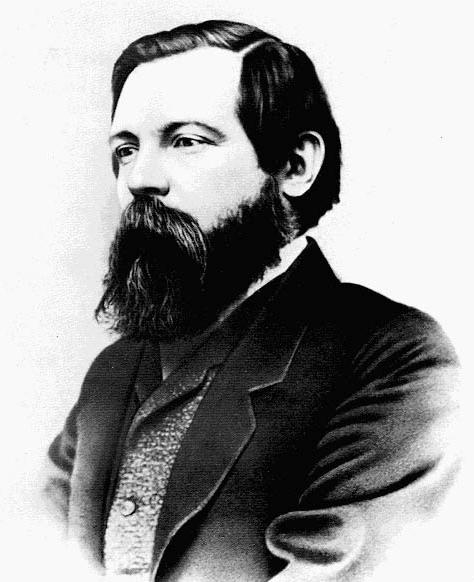
Friedrich Engels

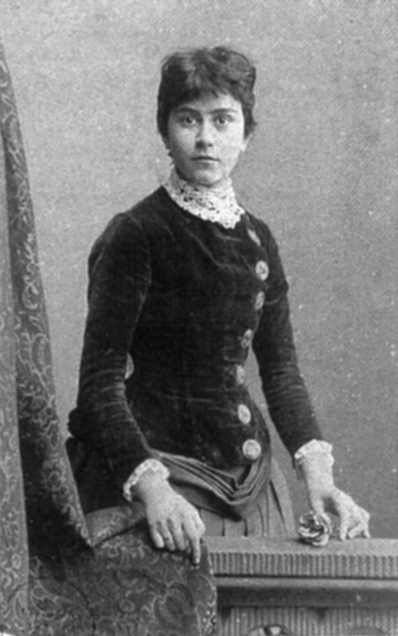
Else Lasker-Schüler, 1895

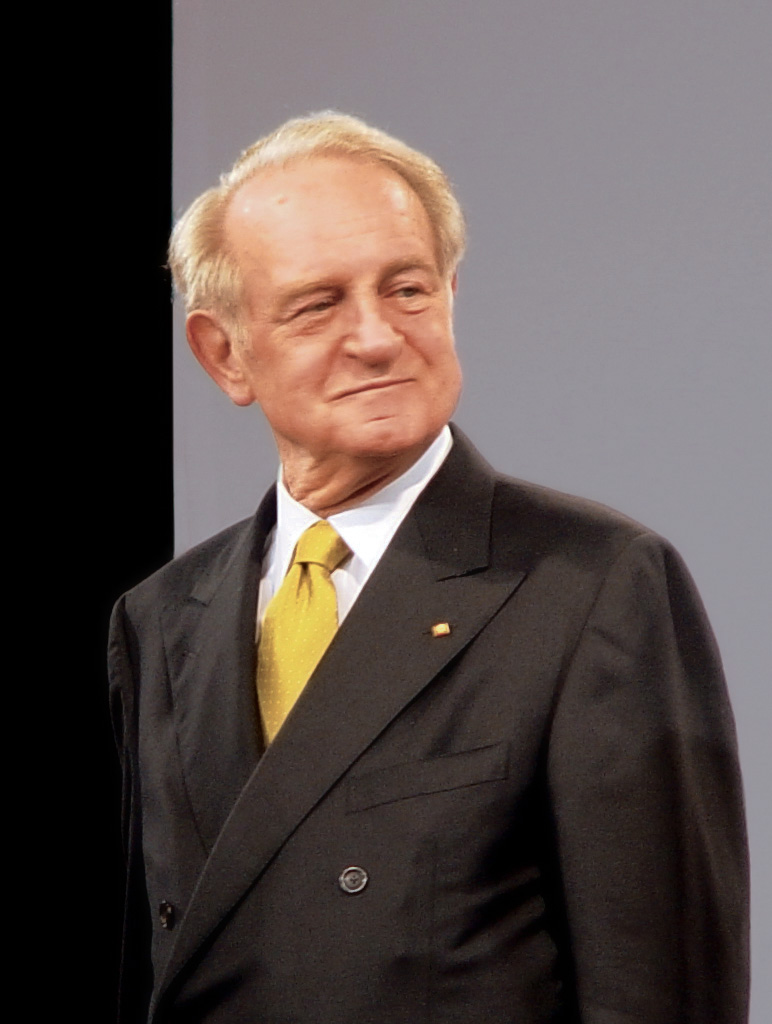
Federal President Johannes Rau in 2004

- Ian Ashley (born 1947), British-German Formula One driver
- Pina Bausch (1940–2009), choreographer known for her work with the Wuppertal Dance Theater, died in Wuppertal
- Friedrich Bayer (1825–1880), founder of the Friedrich Bayer paint factory, later Bayer AG
- Greta Bösel (1908–1947), concentration camp guard executed for war crimes
- Gyles Brandreth (born 1948), English writer, broadcaster, actor, and former British Conservative Member of Parliament
- Arno Breker (1900–1991), sculptor
- Peter Brötzmann (1941–2023), free jazz musician
- Rudolf Carnap (1891–1970), philosopher of science
- Rudolf Dreßler (1940–2025), politician and ambassador
- George Dreyfus (born 1928), Australian bassoonist, composer
- Udo Dirkschneider (born 1952), singer and songwriter
- Hermann Ebbinghaus (1850–1909), psychologist who studied memory
- Friedrich Engels (1820–1895), philosopher, historian, coauthor of The Communist Manifesto (with Karl Marx)
- Kurt Franz (1914–1998), SS Officer, major perpetrator of genocide during the Holocaust, died in Wuppertal
- Henrik Freischlader (born 1982), blues guitarist, singer, songwriter, producer
- Daniel Gerlach (born 1977), journalist
- Hans Grüneberg (1907–1982), British geneticist, born in Wuppertal.
- Marco Goecke, (born 1972) choreographer
- Vincenzo Gualtieri, professional boxer
- Christoph Maria Herbst (born 1966), actor and comedian
- Carolina Hermann (born 1988), figure skater
- Felix Hoffmann (1868–1946), scientist, synthesized aspirin while working at a Bayer facility in Wuppertal
- Wolf Hoffmann (born 1959), metal guitarist, initiator of the musical band Accept
- Raimund Hoghe (1949–2021), choreographer, dancer, film maker, journalist, and author
- Werner Hoyer (born 1951), politician (FDP), President of the European Investment Bank
- Ignaz Kirchner (1946–2018), actor
- Linda Kisabaka (born 1969), middle-distance runner
- Hans Knappertsbusch (1888–1965), orchestra conductor
- Peter Kowald (1944–2002), free jazz musician
- Adolph Hermann Josef Kuhrs, later Adolph Coors, (1847–1929), brewer
- Else Lasker-Schüler (1869–1945), expressionist poet
- Harald Leipnitz (1926–2000), actor
- Ulrich Leyendecker (1946–2018), composer
- Christian Lindner (born 1979), politician
- Hans Peter Luhn (1896–1964), computer scientist
- Reimar Lüst (1923–2020), astrophysicist
- Hans Moller (1905–2000), painter
- Steffen Möller (born 1969), satirist and actor in Poland
- Sylkie Monoff, singer-songwriter
- Franz Yaakov Orgler (1914–2015), track and field athlete
- Simone Osygus (born 1968), swimmer
- Siegfried Palm (1927–2005), cellist, director of Hochschule für Musik Köln, general manager of Deutsche Oper Berlin
- Julius Plücker (1801–1868), physicist
- Kolja Pusch (born 1993), footballer
- Johannes Rau (1931–2006), politician (SPD), former Federal President of Germany.
- Hans Reichel (1949–2011), composer, recording artist, and inventor of the Daxophone
- Johann Eduard Reichenow (1883–1960), protozoologist
- Emil Rittershaus (1834–1897), poet
- Alice Schwarzer (born 1942), one of the leaders of the German second wave feminism
- Annette Seiltgen (born 1964), operatic singer
- Hans Singer (1910–2006), British economist
- Ilse Steppat (1917–1969), actress
- Rita Süssmuth (1937–2026), politician, tenth president of the Bundestag
- Horst Tappert (1923–2008), actor
- Helmut Thielicke (1908–1986), theologian
- Hubert Tigges (1895–1971), German tour operator and travel organizer; founder (1928) of the Wuppertal-based study-tour company Dr. Tigges-Fahrten, later one of the four firms that merged to form TUI in 1968. In the 1950s he collaborated with Luis Riu Bertrán in developing German tourism in the Balearic Islands, particularly through early charter travel to Mallorca; he is commemorated locally by the Dr.-Tigges-Weg in Elberfeld.
- Stephen Timoshenko (1878–1972), Russian engineer and academician
- Bettina Tietjen (born 1960), television presenter
- Tom Tykwer (born 1965), movie director and composer
- Ute Vinzing (born 1936), operatic soprano
- Günter Wand (1912–2002), composer and orchestra conductor
- Armin T. Wegner (1886–1978), soldier, medic, human rights activist
- Mathilde Wesendonck (1828–1902), poet, author, artist, muse of Richard Wagner

== Gallery ==
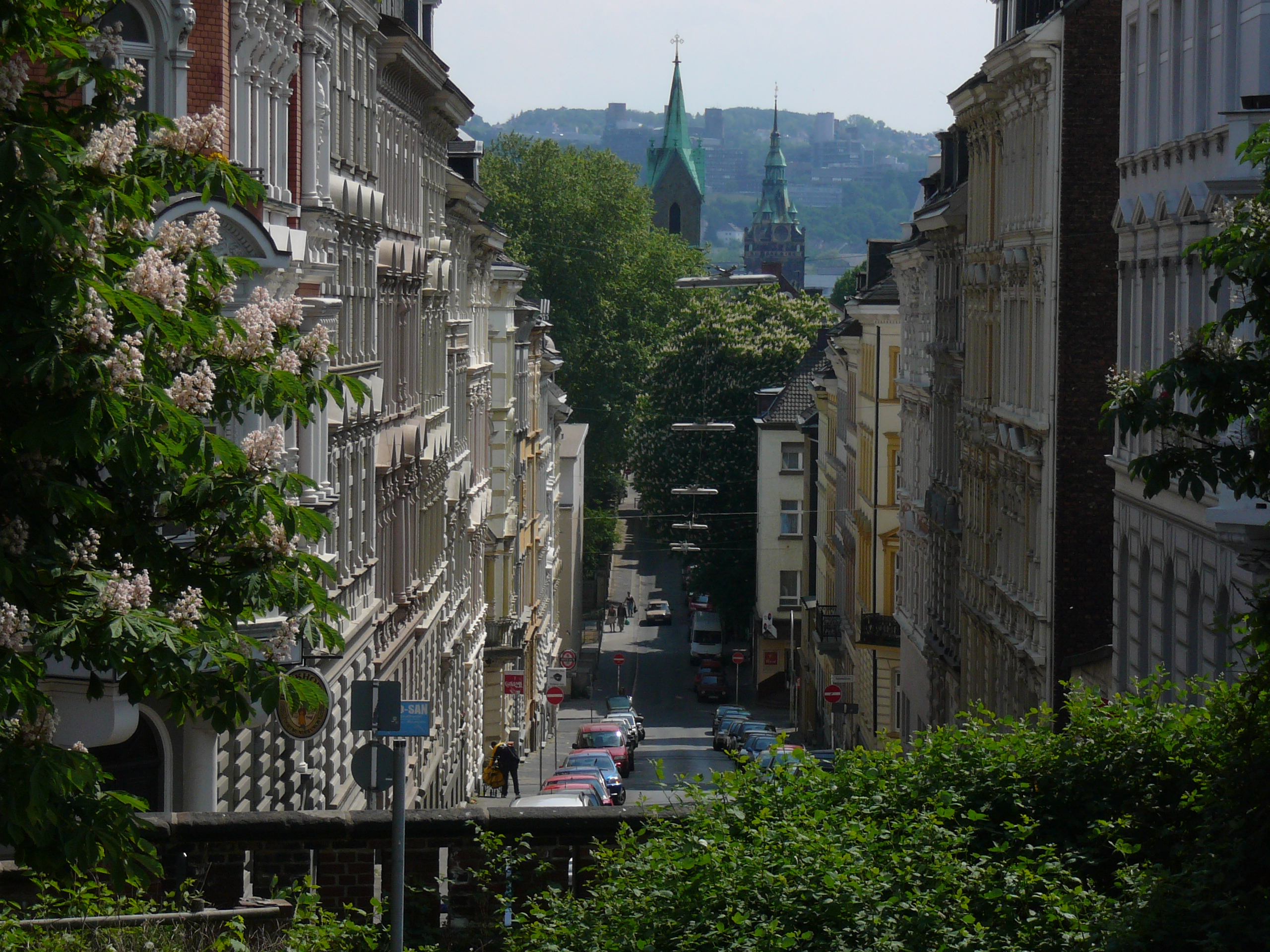
Typical steep street in Wuppertal

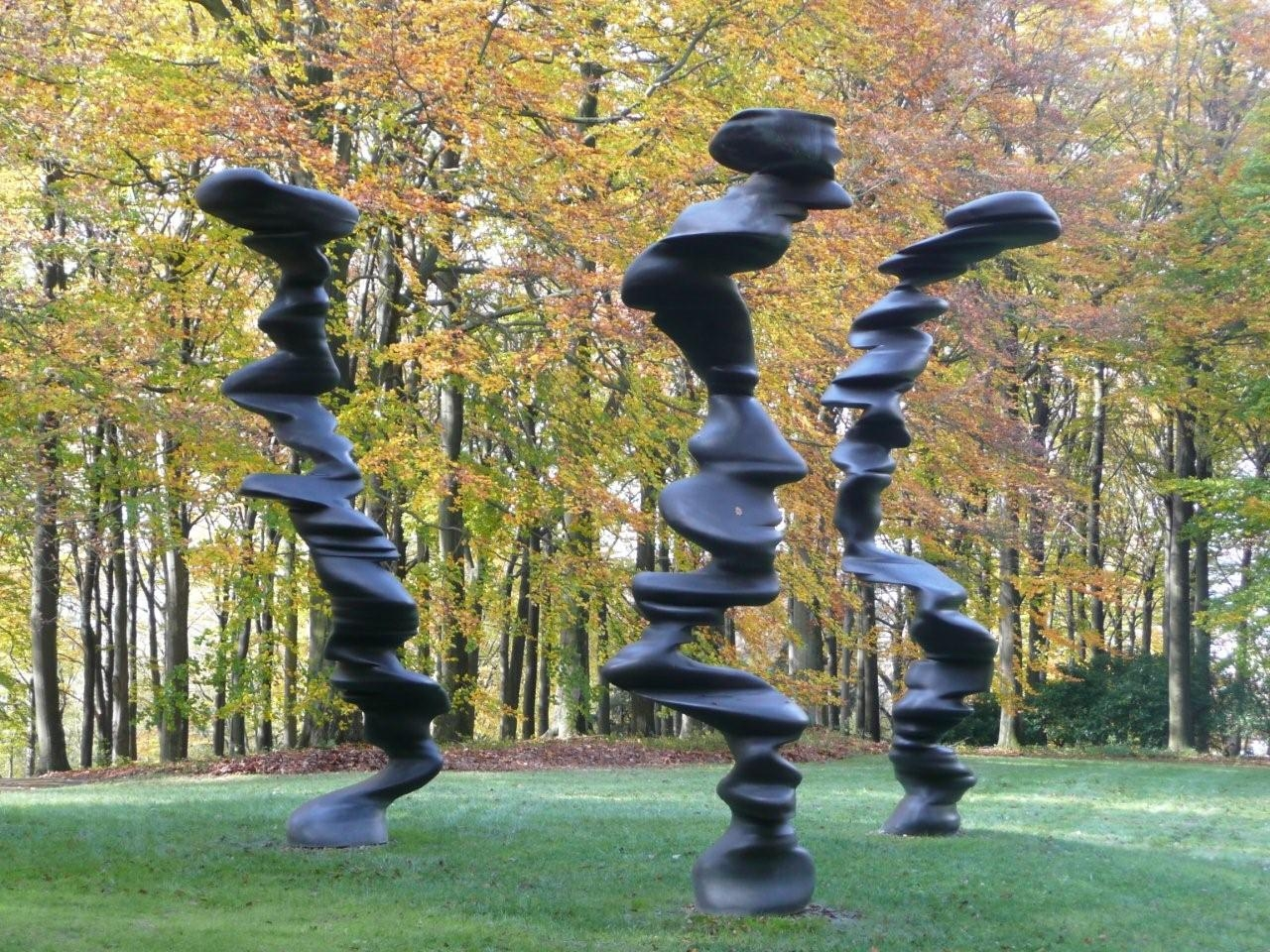
Waldfrieden sculpture park – Tony Cragg's Points of View (2008)

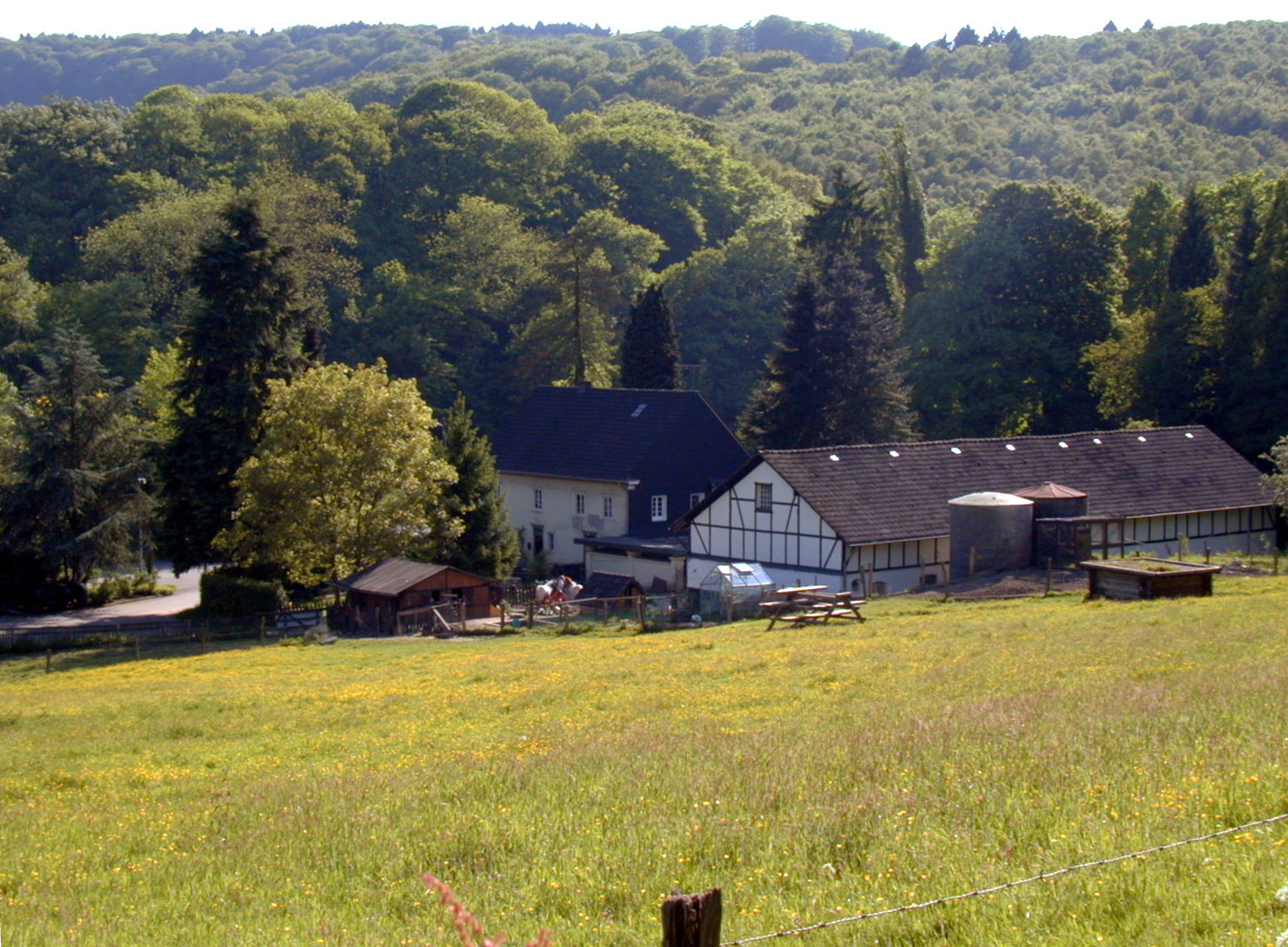
View of Burgholz woods with typical Bergisches farmerhouse

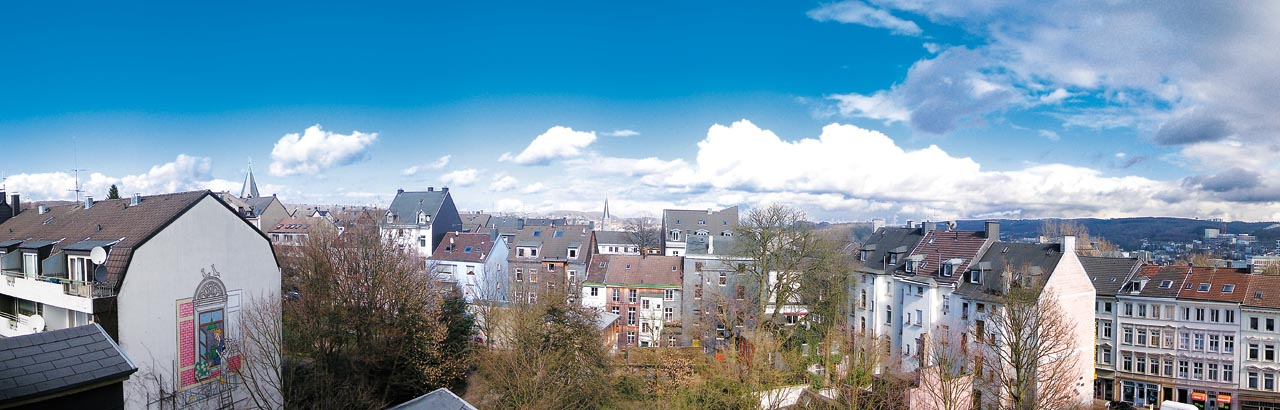
Panoramic view of the Ölberg quarter in Wuppertal

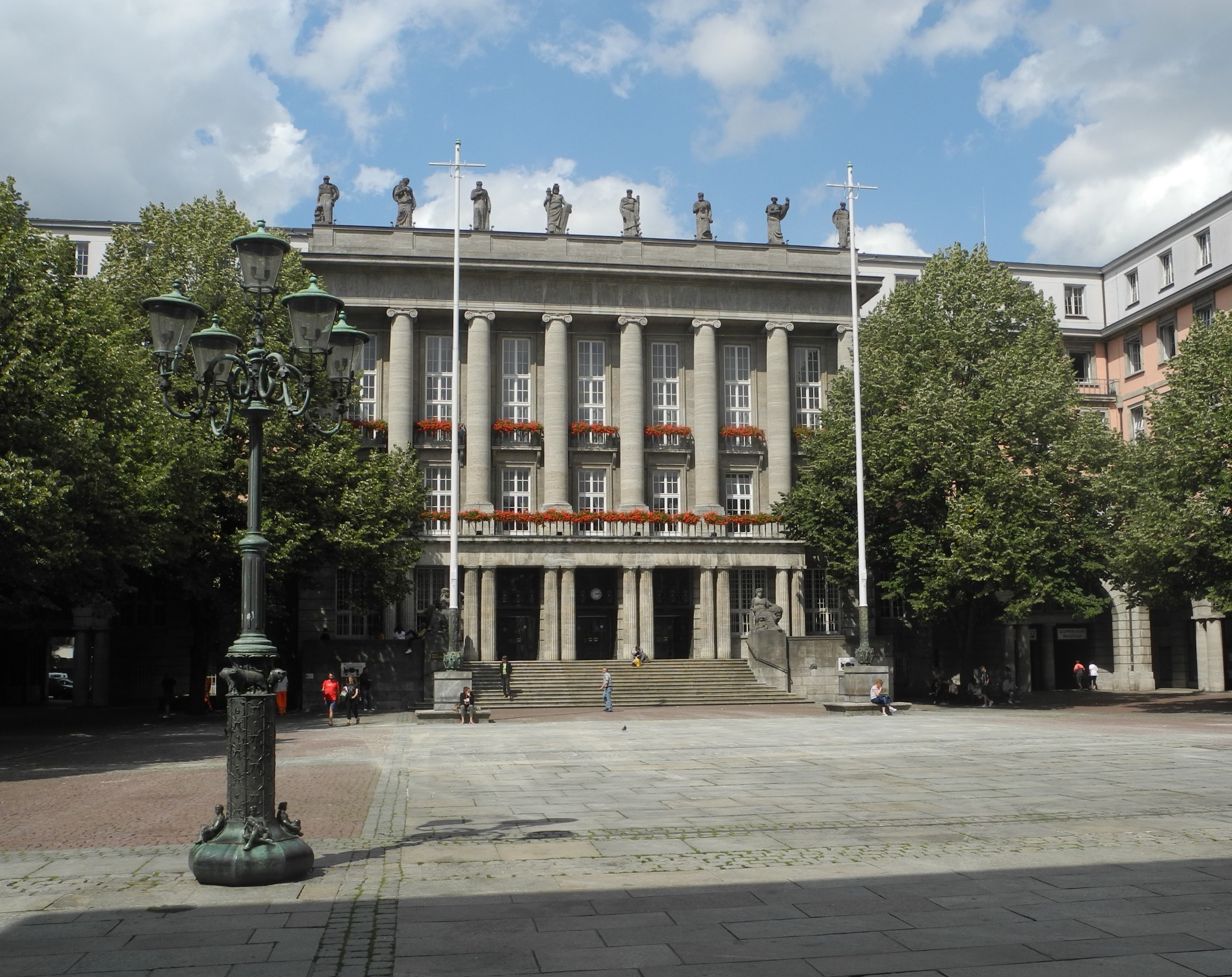
City Hall in the district of Barmen

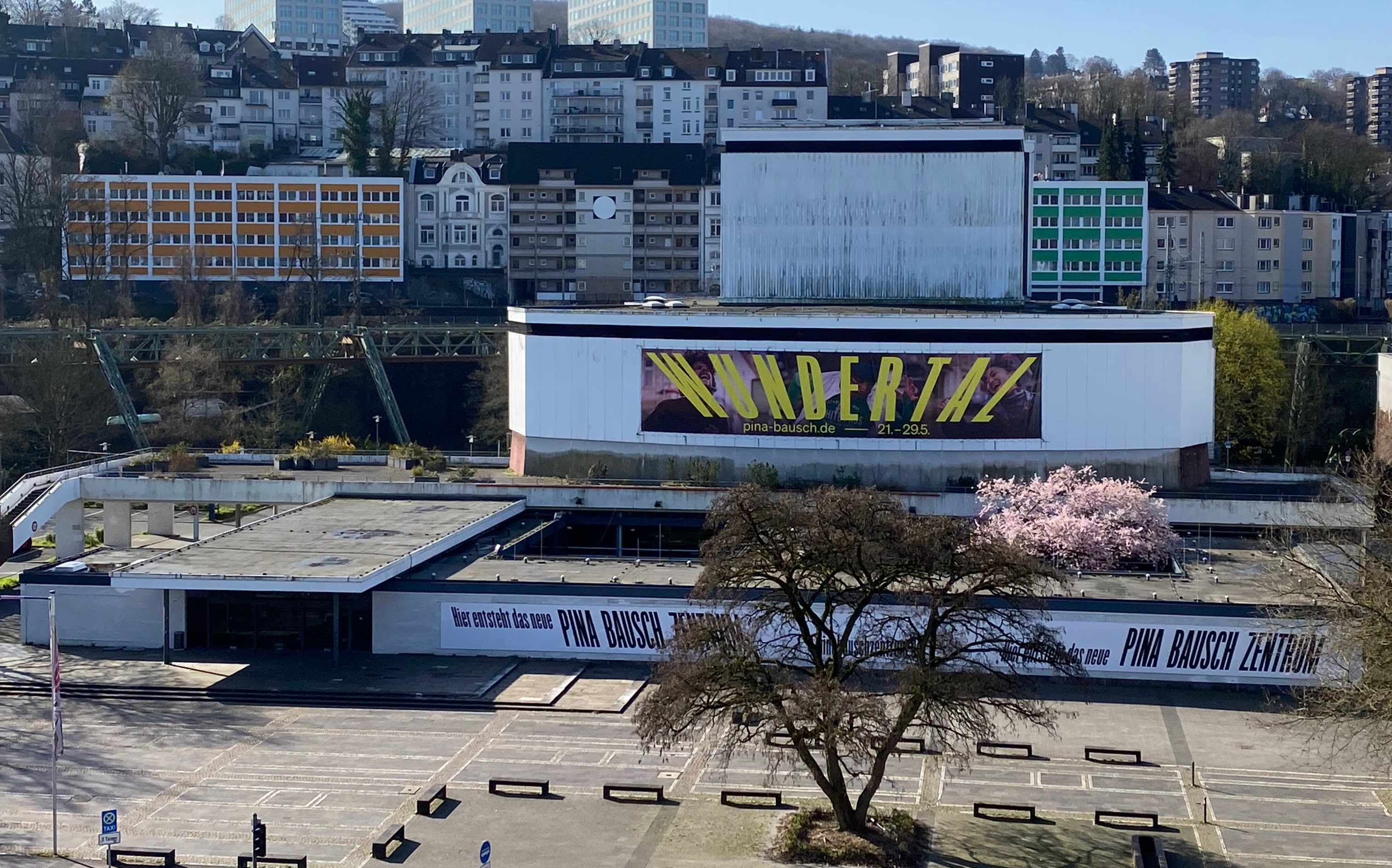
The Schauspielhaus theatre

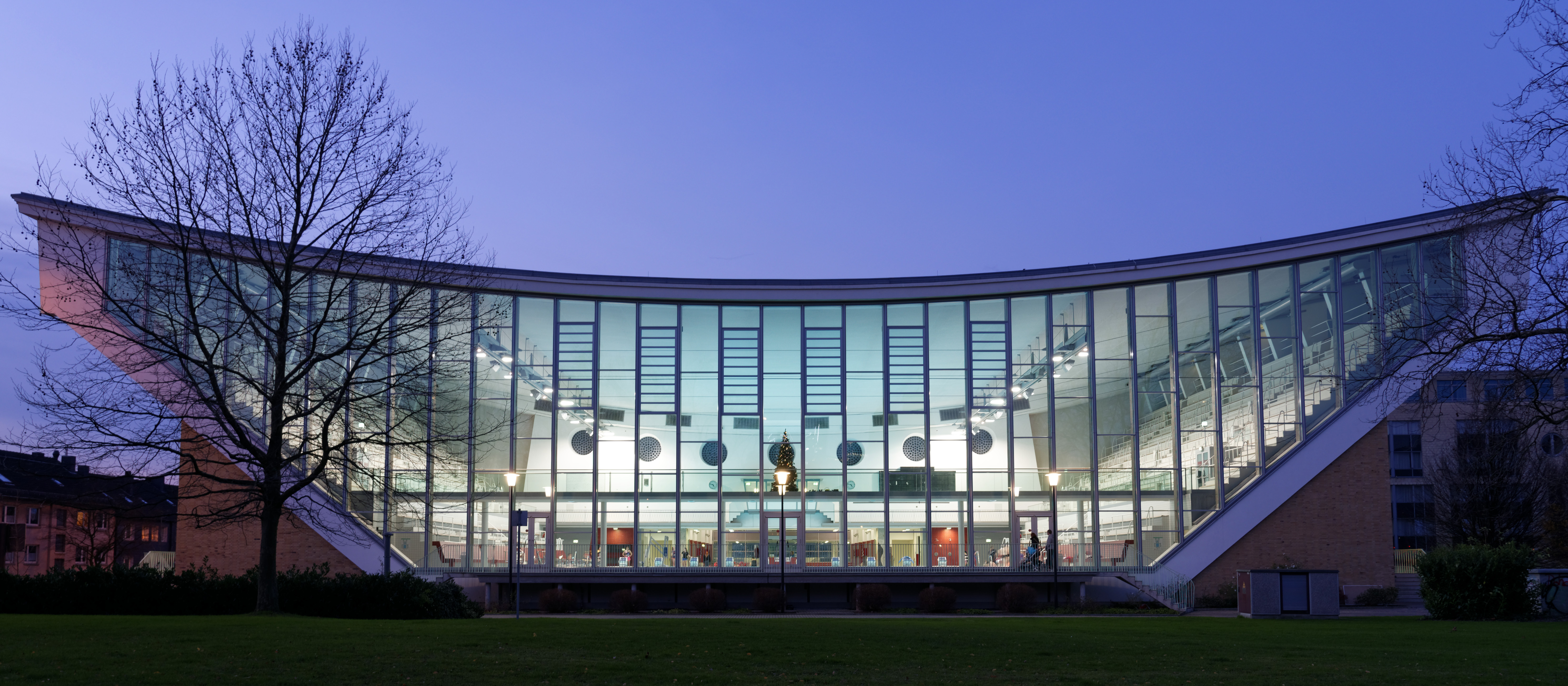
The swimming arena "Schwimmoper"

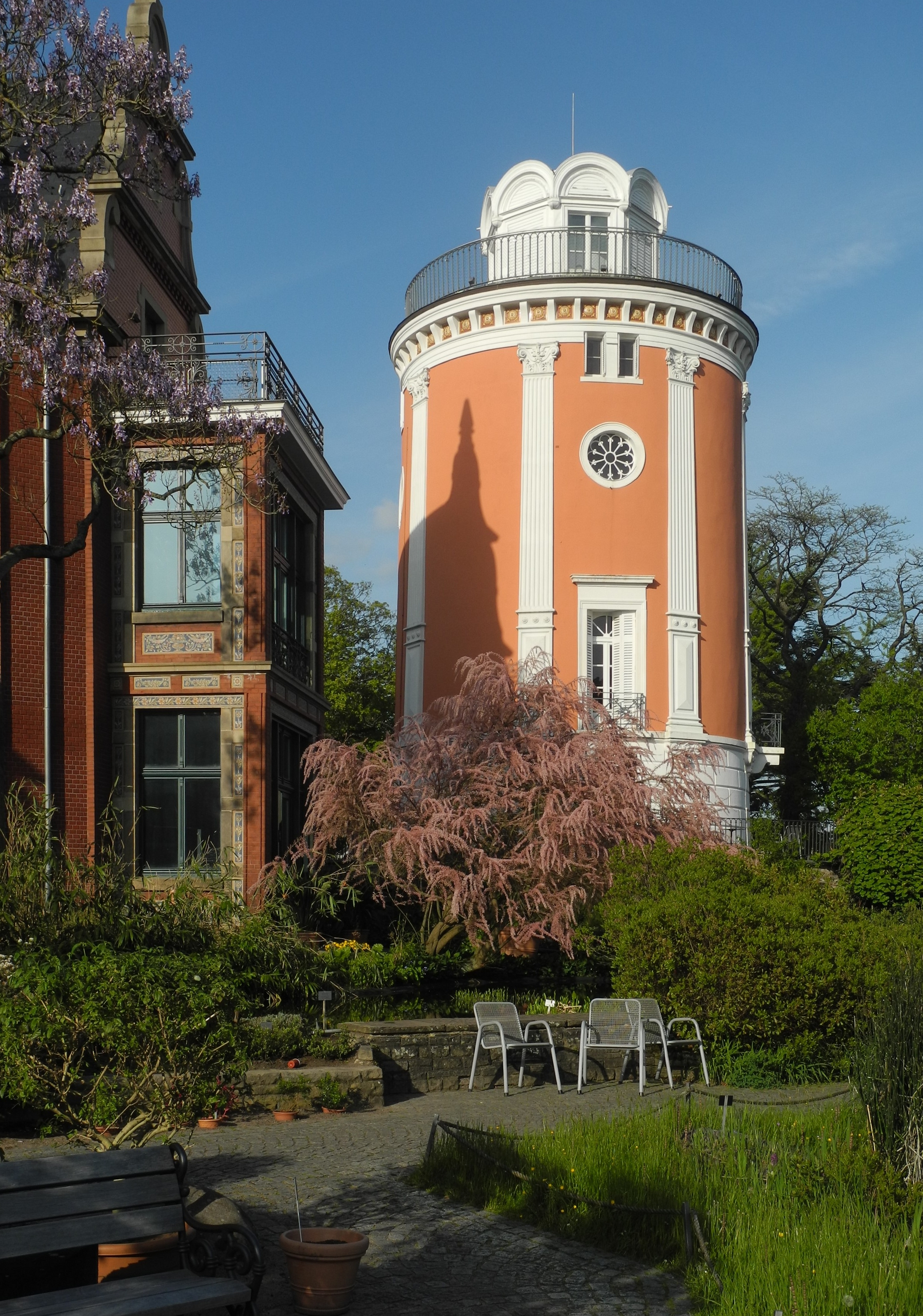
Elisenturm

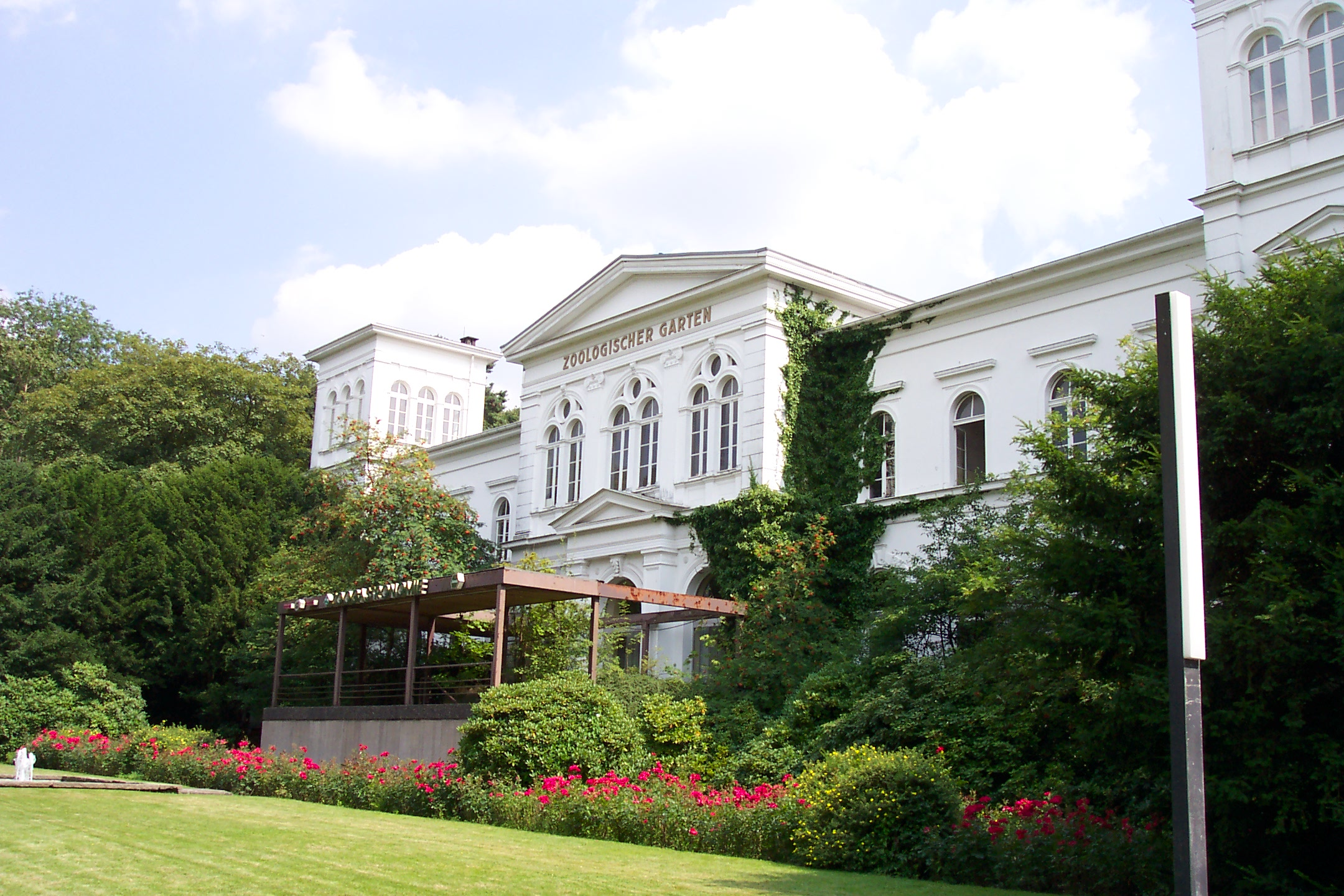
Wuppertal Zoo

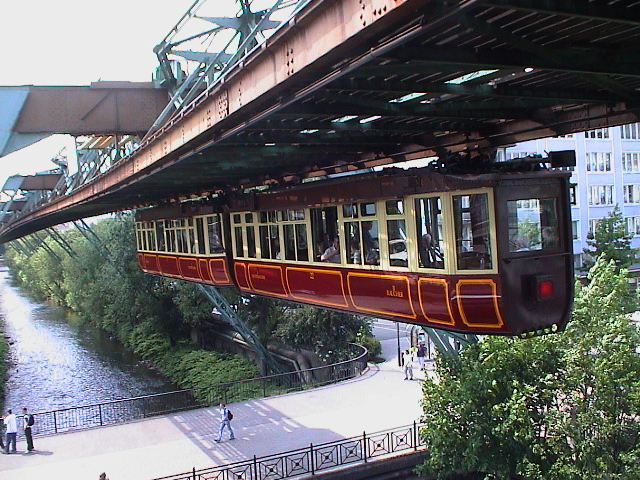
Special tours with the historical 'Kaiserwagen'

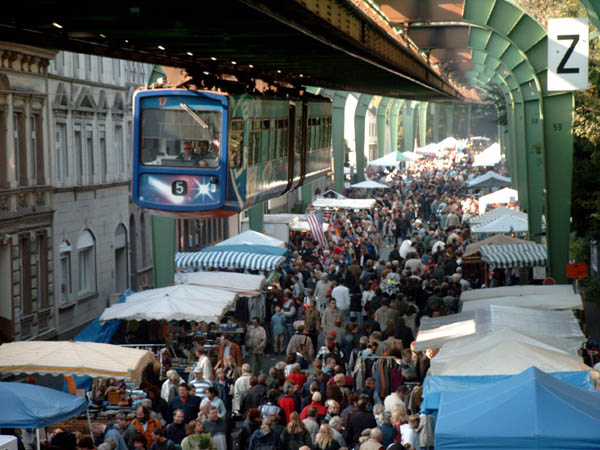
World's largest 'one day flea market'

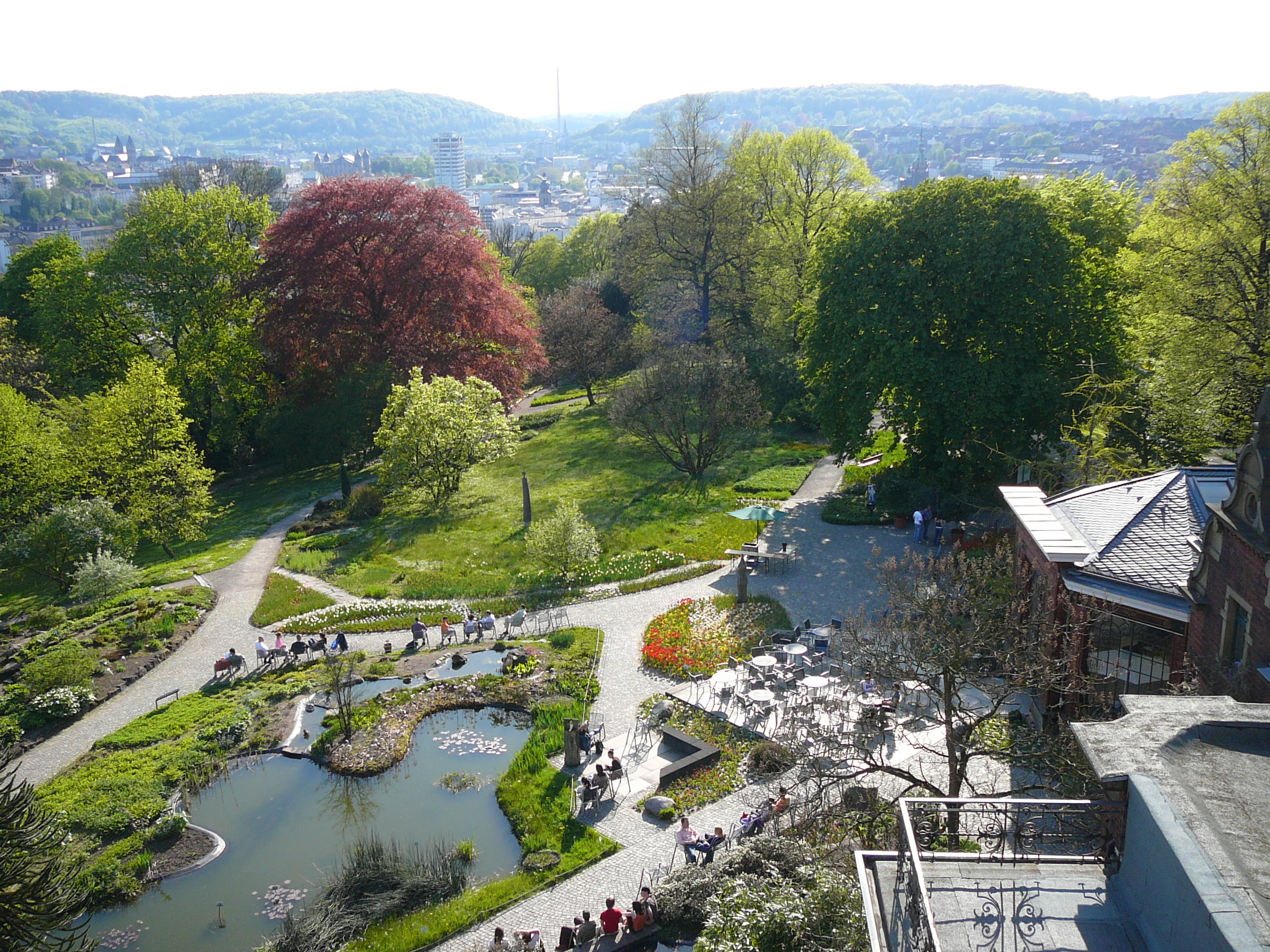
Botanic garden and view over the city

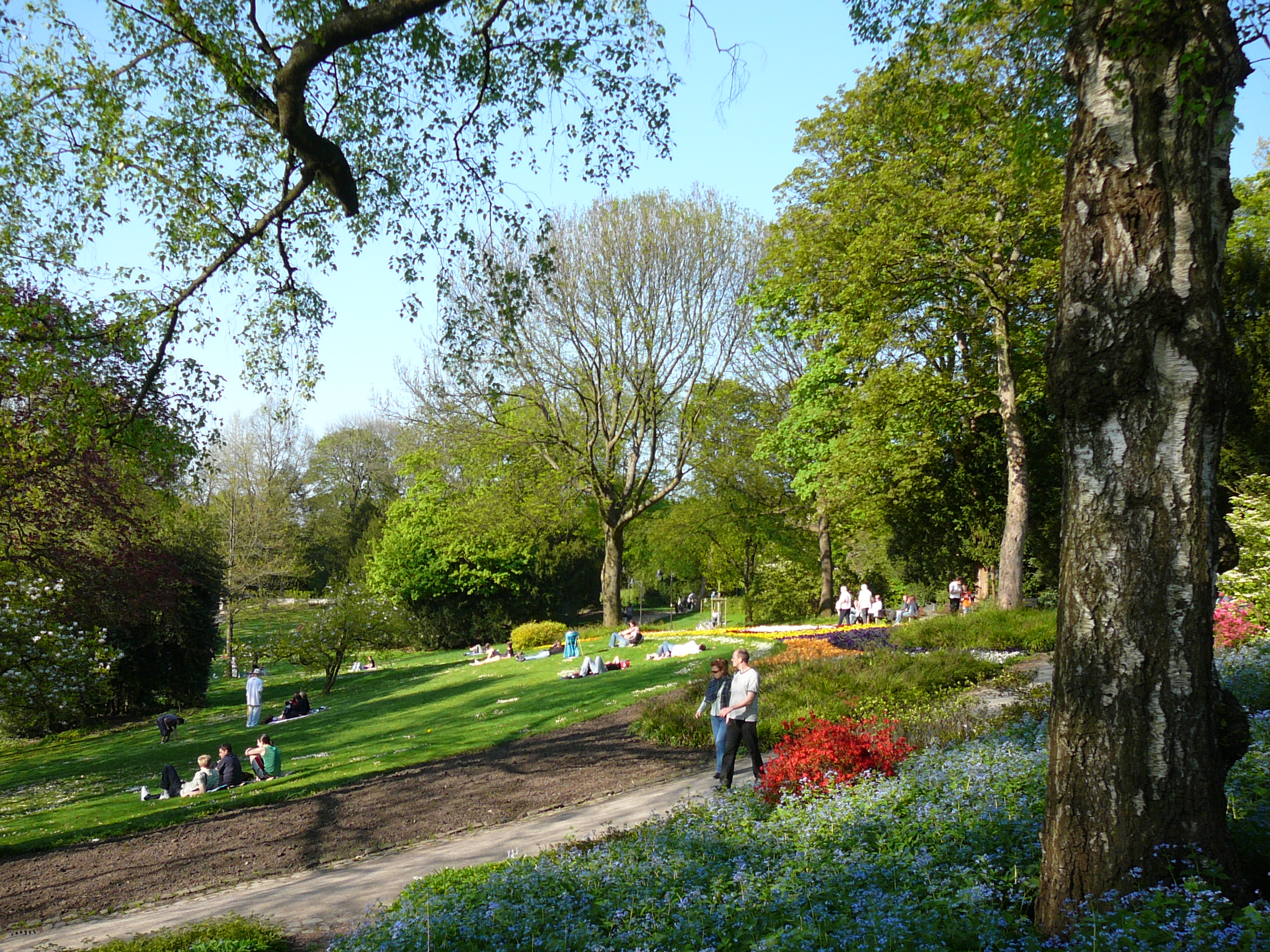
The central 'Hardt' park

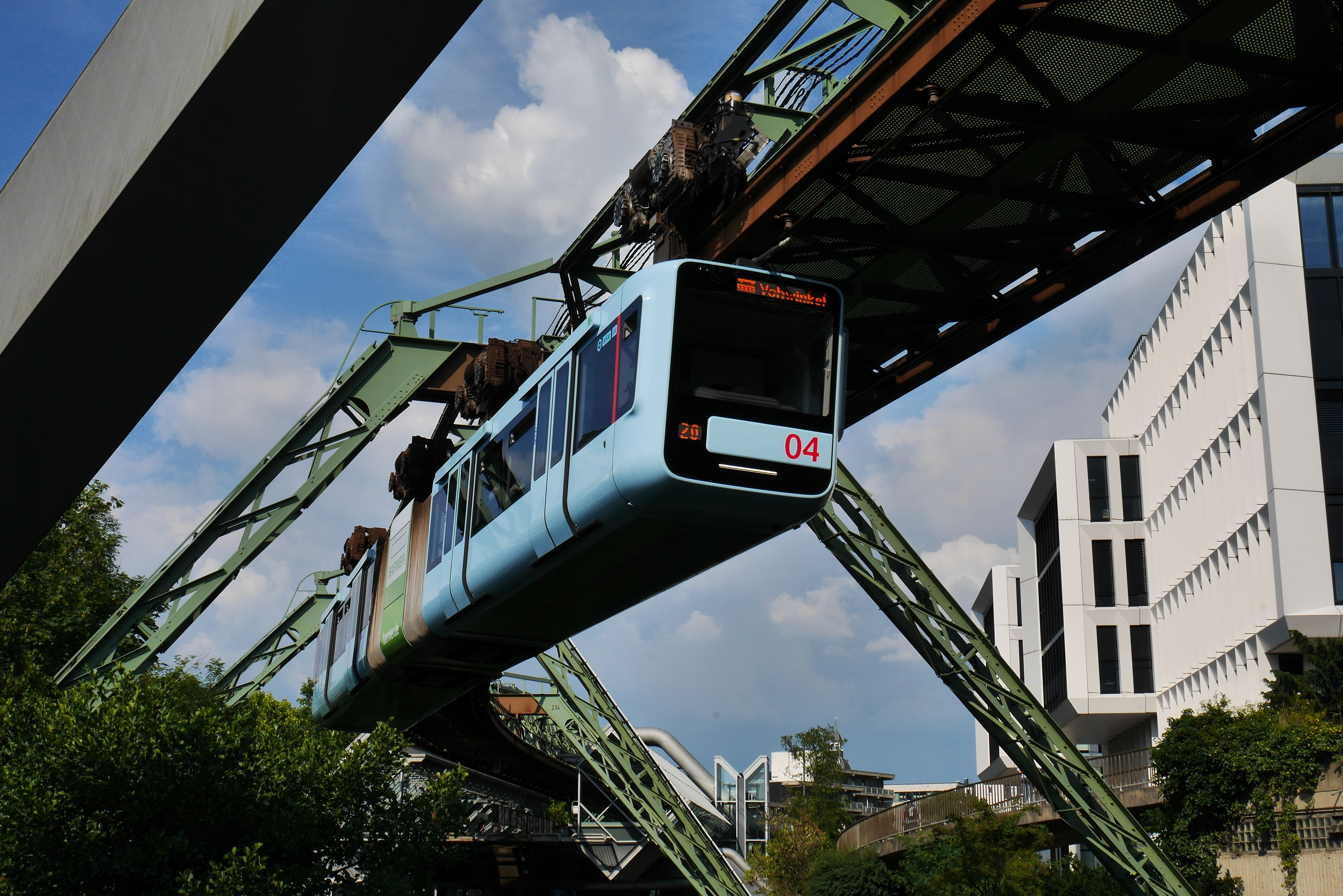
The current generation of the Schwebebahn

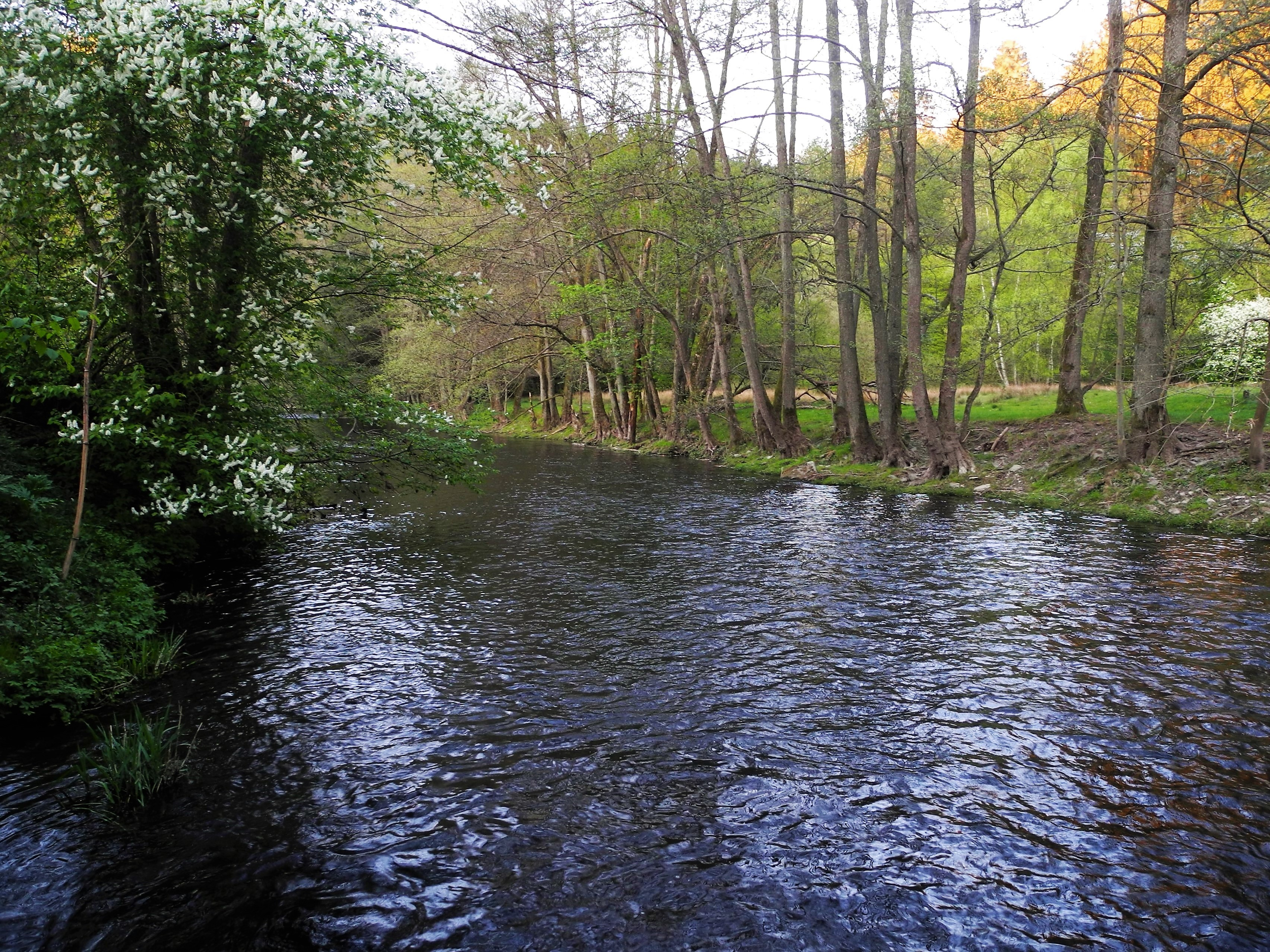
The river Wupper in the woods of Wuppertal

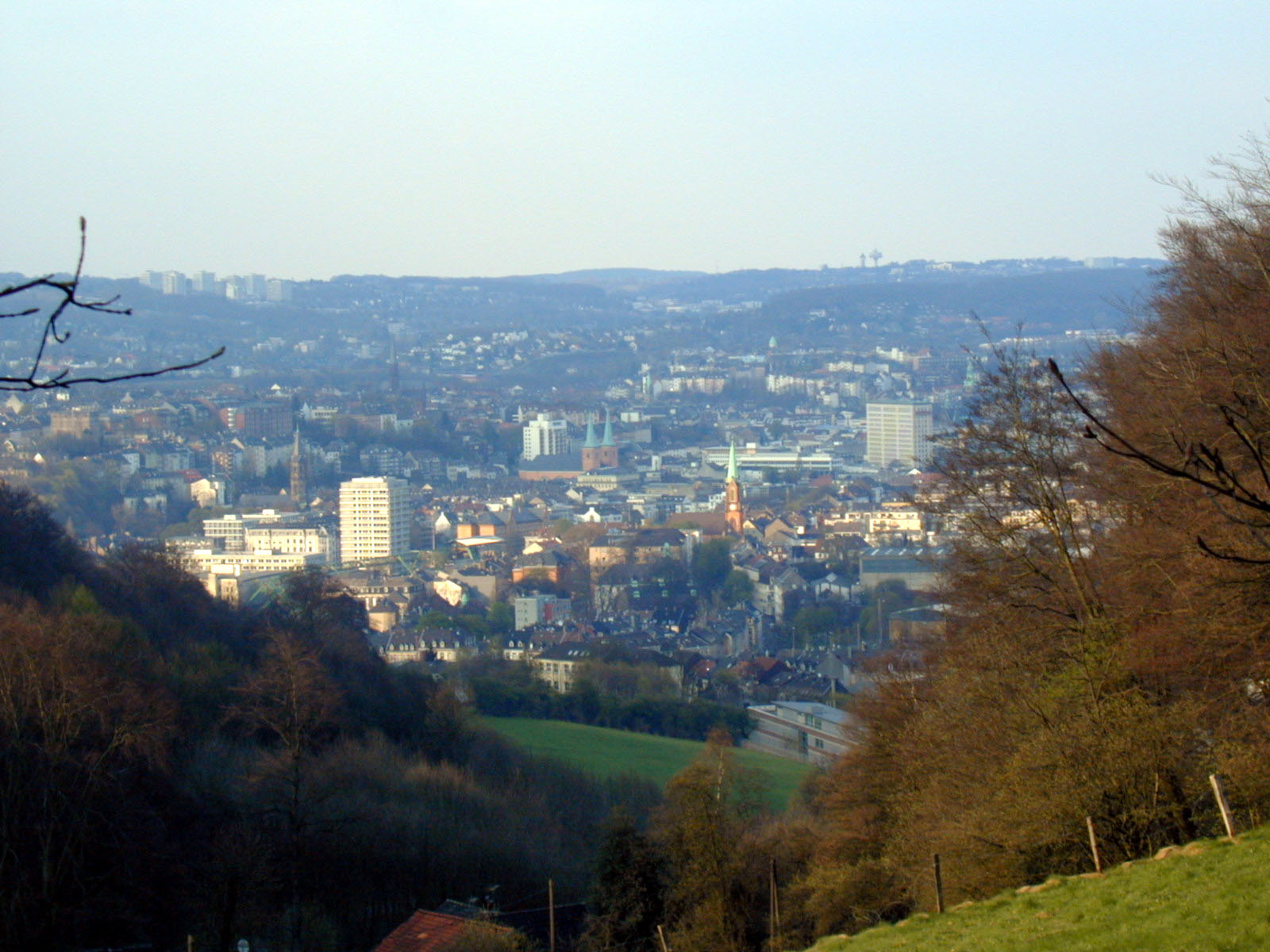
View from the Kiesberg woods

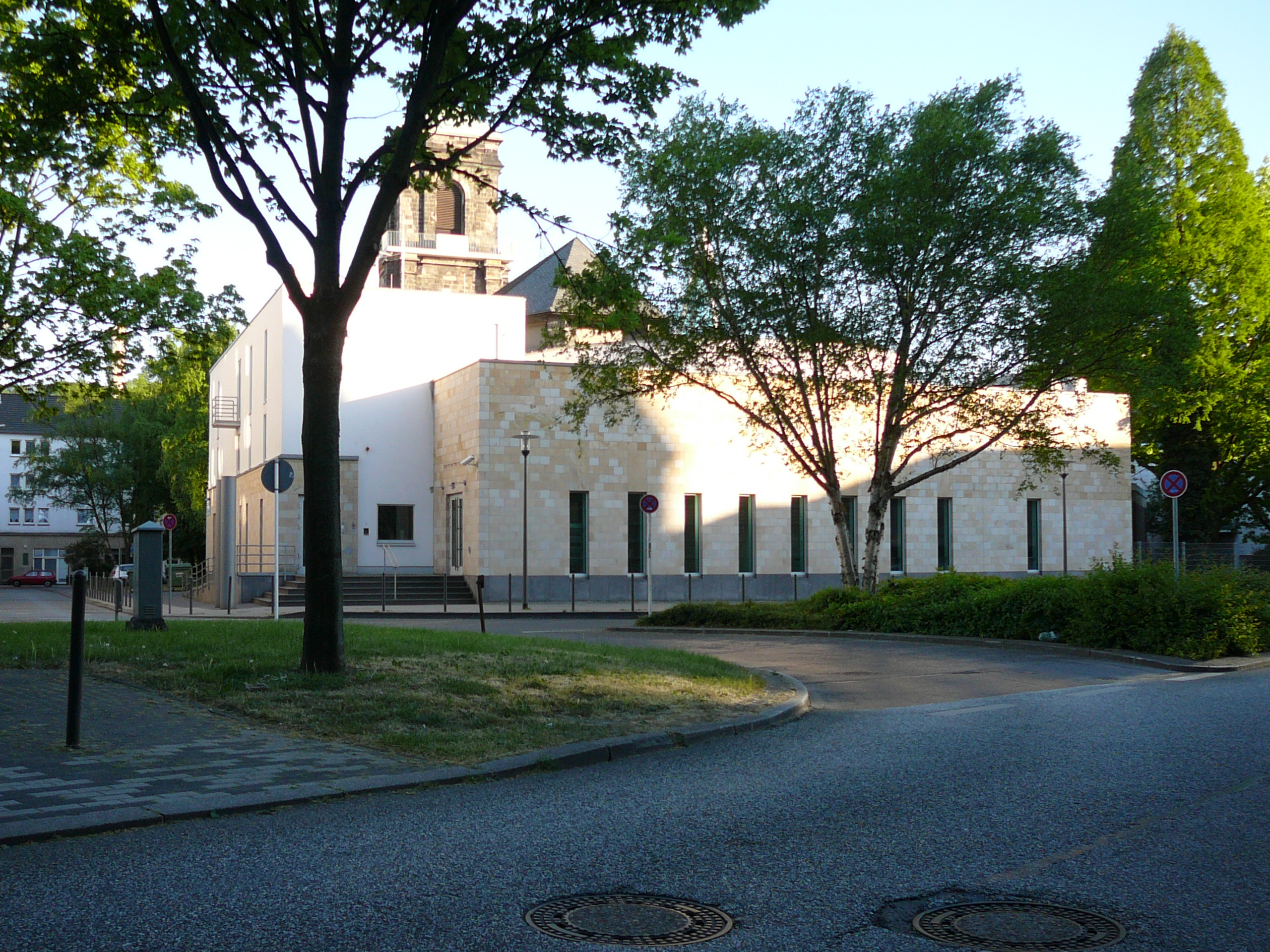
A synagogue in the district of Barmen

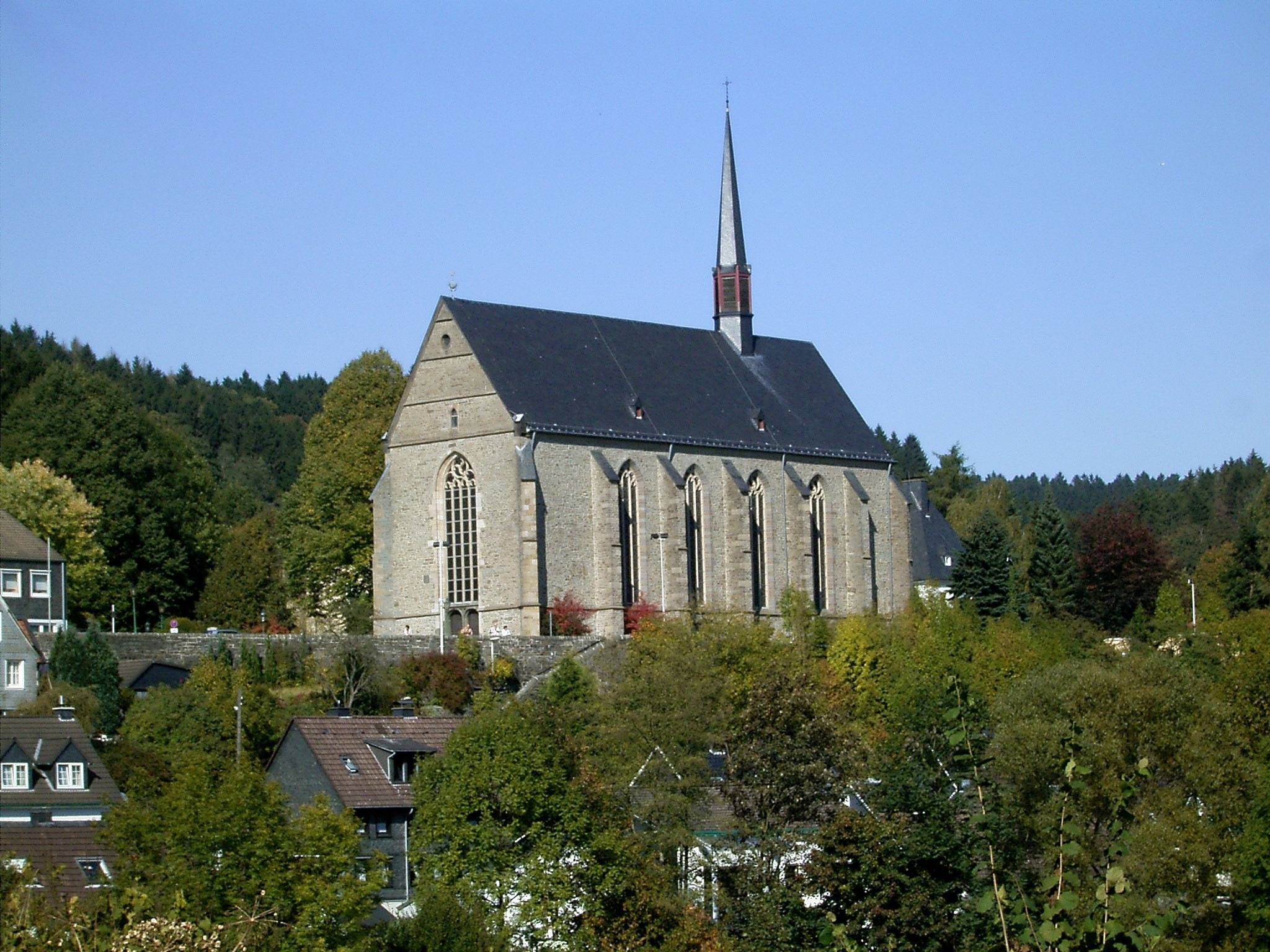
Abbey Wuppertal-Beyenburg

== See also ==
- Polizeipräsidium Wuppertal
- Wefelpütt
