= Langerfeld =

Coordinates: 51°16′N 7°15′E

Langerfeld is a borough of the German city of Wuppertal.

On 24 June 2018, an explosion in the area damaged an apartment complex and surroundings. The blast was powerful and destroyed the three top floors of the block and a parked car. The impact caused fires inside the building. Twenty-five people were injured, five of them seriously. The explosion's cause is unknown and still under investigation.
