= Sonnborner Straße station =

Train station in Wuppertal, Germany

Sonnborner Straße

General information
- Location: 148 Sonnborner Straße, Sonnborn, Wuppertal; North Rhine-Westphalia; Germany
- Coordinates: 51.2381°N 7.0967°E
- Operator: WSW mobil
- Line: Wuppertal Schwebebahn
- Distance: 450m
- Platforms: 2 (side)
- Tracks: 2 monorail tracks
- Bus stands: 2
- Bus operators: Wuppertaler Stadtwerke
- Connections: Sonnborn

Construction
- Structure type: Elevated above road
- Parking: Yes (street)
- Architect: Eugen Langen

Other information
- Fare zone: VRR: 656; VRS: 1650 (VRR transitional tariff)

History
- Opened: 24 May 1901

Services
Preceding station	WSW mobil	Following station
Hammerstein towards Vohwinkel Schwebebahn	Wuppertal Schwebebahn	Zoo/Stadion towards Oberbarmen
Location

Sonnborner Straße station is an intermediate station on the Wuppertal Suspension Railway in Westphalia, Germany. It was opened on 24 May 1901 and is within walking distance of Wuppertal-Sonnborn station.
