= Hammerstein station =

Monorail station in Wuppertal, Germany

Hammerstein

General information
- Location: 1 Hammersteiner Allee, Vohwinkel; Wuppertal, Westphalia; Germany
- Coordinates: 51.2364°N 7.0884°E
- Elevation: Suspended
- Operator: WSW mobil
- Line: Wuppertal Schwebebahn
- Platforms: 2 (side)
- Tracks: 2 Suspended Monorail
- Bus routes: 600, E870, E874, E902, E904, NE1
- Bus stands: 1
- Bus operators: Wuppertaler Stadtwerke

Construction
- Structure type: Elevated above road
- Parking: Yes (street)
- Architect: Eugen Langen

Other information
- Fare zone: VRR: 656; VRS: 1650 (VRR transitional tariff)

History
- Opened: 24 May 1901

Services
Preceding station	WSW mobil	Following station
Bruch towards Vohwinkel Schwebebahn	Wuppertal Schwebebahn	Sonnborner Straße towards Oberbarmen
Location

Hammerstein station is a transit station of the Wuppertal Schwebebahn monorail.

It is located in the city of Wuppertal, in Westphalia, Germany.
