= Bruch station =

Monorail station in Wuppertal, Germany

Bruch

General information
- Location: 9 Kaiserstr., Vohwinkel; Wuppertal, Westphalia; Germany
- Coordinates: 51.2342°N 7.0770°E
- Elevation: Suspended
- Operator: WSW mobil
- Line: Wuppertal Schwebebahn
- Distance: 300m/328yd
- Platforms: 2 (side)
- Tracks: 2 Suspended Monorail
- Bus routes: 600, 631, E839, E904, NE1
- Bus stands: 2
- Bus operators: Wuppertaler Stadtwerke
- Connections: Vohwinkel Deutsche Bahn

Construction
- Structure type: Elevated above road
- Parking: Yes: on-street
- Architect: Eugen Langen

Other information
- Fare zone: VRR: 656; VRS: 1650 (VRR transitional tariff)

History
- Opened: 24 May 1901

Services
Preceding station	WSW mobil	Following station
Vohwinkel Schwebebahn Terminus	Wuppertal Schwebebahn	Hammerstein towards Oberbarmen
Location

Bruch is a station on the Wuppertal Schwebebahn. It is close to Vohwinkel Deutsche Bahn station.
