= 1999 Wuppertal Schwebebahn accident =

Railway accident in Germany

Coordinates: 51.2518°N 7.1327°E

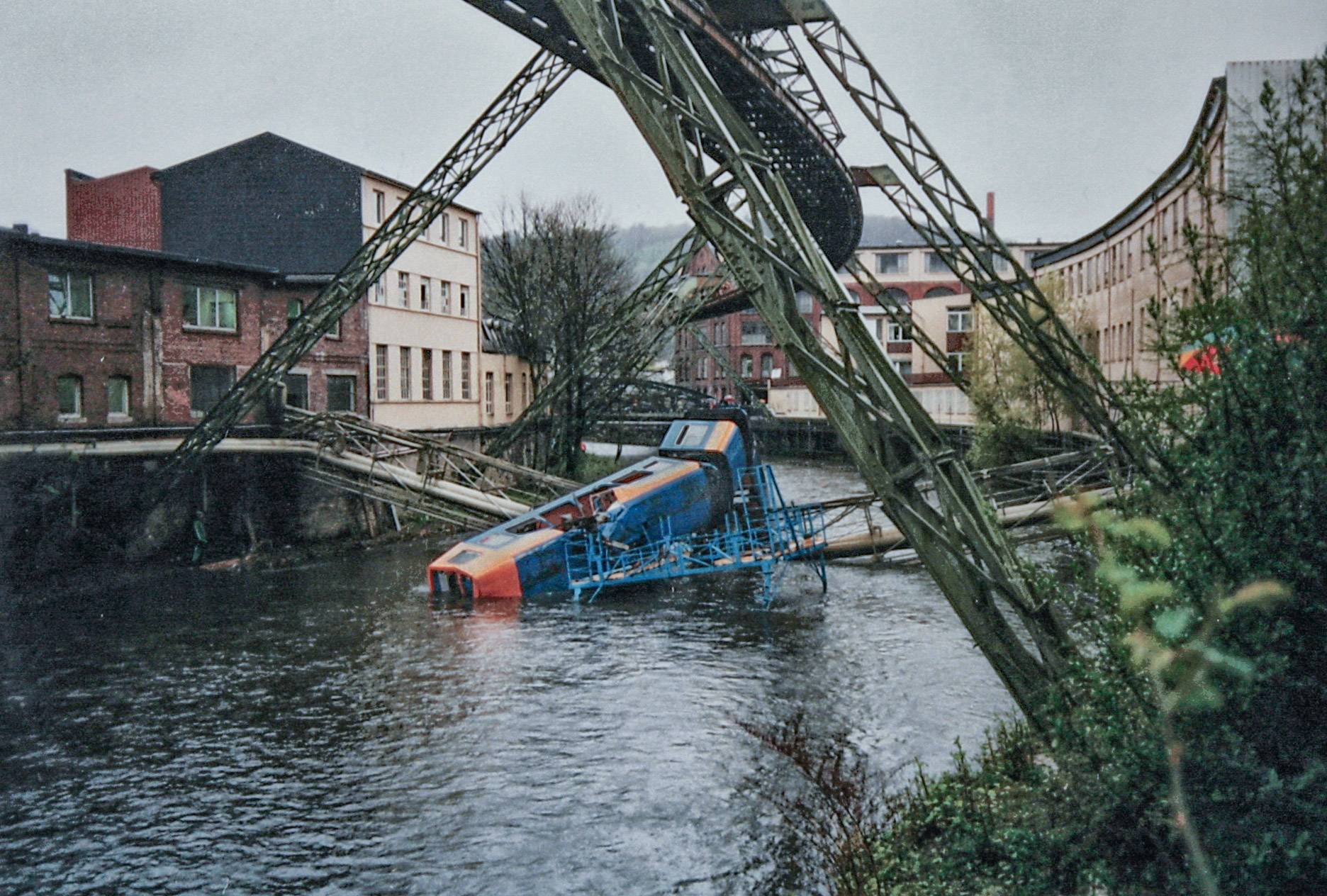
- Scene of the incident, where a train fell onto a steam pipeline.

Details
- Date: 12 April 1999; 27 years ago
- Location: Wuppertal, Germany
- Cause: Train struck maintenance equipment left on tracks by rail workers.

Statistics
- Trains: 1
- Deaths: 5 (3 in wreck; 2 succumbed to injuries)
- Injured: 47

On 12 April 1999, a Wuppertal Schwebebahn train derailed and fell into the river Wupper on a stretch of track near Robert-Daum-Platz station. The accident, involving car number 4 from the WSW GTW 72 series, killed five people and injured 47, some of them seriously. It remains the worst accident in the railway's history and the only fatal one since the railway opened in 1901.

== Circumstances ==
The articulated train involved in the accident was travelling near kilometre 7 on the suspension railway's route at about 5:45 am local time at a speed of roughly 50 km/h (30 mph) when it struck a steel component (a "claw fastener") that had temporarily been attached to the running rail on the overhead track. The impact tore the lead bogie, the first of four, off the train's roof. The vehicle next leant over to the right, derailed, and then fell almost 10 m (30 ft) into the River Wupper. The train's front section came down on a bridge carrying steam heating pipes across the Wupper, breaking it in the middle. The bogie that had been torn off on impact at first remained up on the track, but quickly came off and fell down on the train, breaking through the vehicle's body.

== Rescue efforts ==
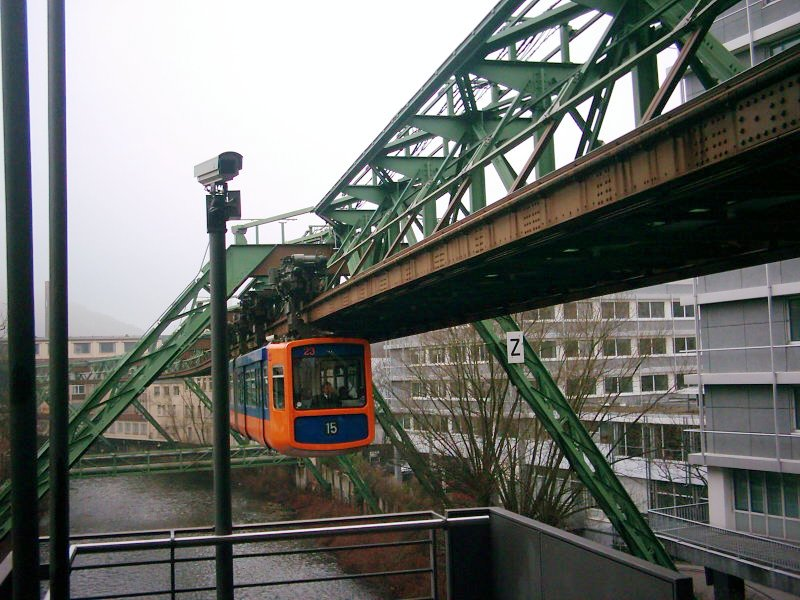
The accident site in 2005; the steam pipe bridge can be seen in the background.

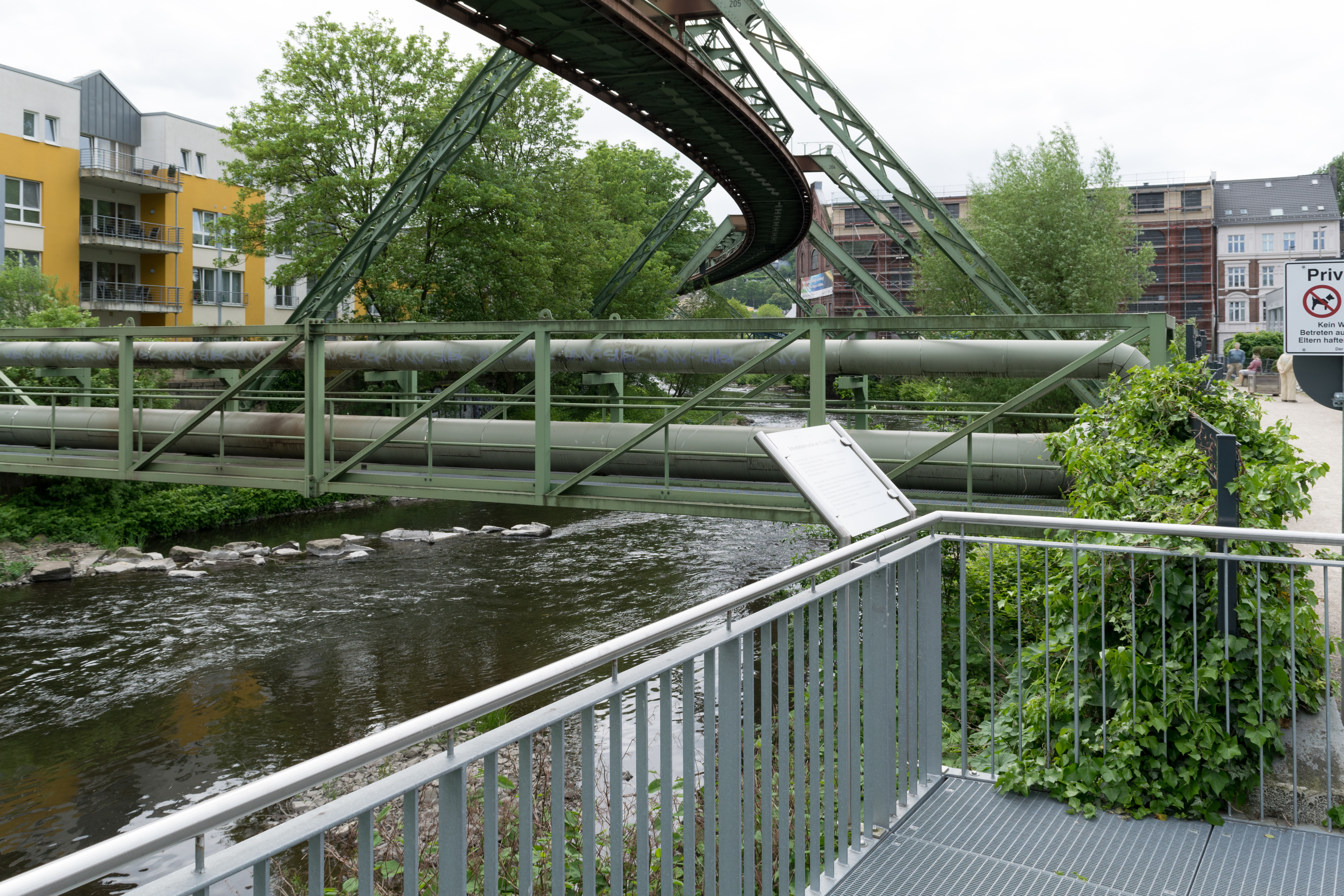
A view of the accident scene from the riverbank in 2016 looking towards Pestalozzistraße station, in the direction from which the train came.

Employees from the firm ELBA, which stood alongside the river and the track, climbed over a scaffold in the river after hearing the loud bang and began the efforts to save the victims. The train's driver, who was himself injured, also helped to rescue the passengers. According to a resident who called the emergency services to report the accident, his report was at first met with laughter from the dispatcher on the telephone, as it was considered inconceivable for a Schwebebahn train to fall off the overhead track, and nobody had ever died in an accident on this railway, which was thus said to be the world's safest.

In the end, more than 150 firefighting and ambulance personnel were on hand, along with twelve emergency physicians, to rescue and treat the injured at the site, which could only be reached with difficulty. Even clergymen were called into service to minister to those who were suffering from psychological shock.

The injured were taken to two nearby buildings and a tent set up by the firefighters in an underpass. Further gathering points for the injured were set up at a factory and in a quickly built tent city at a carpark. Conference rooms on the ground floor at a bank became a field hospital. A nearby hospital, the Ferdinand-Sauerbruch-Klinikum (now called the Helios Universitätsklinikum Wuppertal), was the first to admit patients from the accident scene. Meanwhile, the city square Robert-Daum-Platz, where Bundesstraße 7 and Landesstraße 427 cross, became an emergency landing pad for three rescue helicopters. At the Städtisches Klinikum Barmen (another hospital, now also part of the Helios Universitätsklinikum Wuppertal), all routine operations were postponed and all available doctors were pressed into emergency service. Within three hours of the accident, all 47 of the injured, suffering from broken bones, bruises and lacerations, found themselves at hospitals in Wuppertal, Remscheid and Solingen. Two men were recovered from the wreck dead, while a woman's body was only recovered hours later after the river had borne it downstream from the accident site. Two other passengers later succumbed to their injuries.

== Recovery efforts ==
First, the affected stretch of the overhead track and the trainwreck in the river were seized by order of the public prosecutor's office (Staatsanwaltschaft). The recovery of the fallen suspension railway train was readied on 13 April 1999 and proceeded only with great difficulty. It turned out that an emergency laneway next to an office-residential building could not be used for the needed 300-metric-ton crane because an underground garage presented stability problems. Across the Wupper lay the grounds of the firm ELBA, which offered an alternative, although the direct path to the accident scene was blocked by a production building. Nevertheless, during that day, the crane was positioned there and an excavator was lowered into the Wupper. To prepare for the actual recovery, the steel truss carrying the steam pipes, onto which the suspension railway train had fallen, had to be taken apart. Meanwhile, several halogen floodlights were mounted on the overhead track and a police light mast vehicle was brought to the scene. As evening set in, the recovery scene was brightly lit. The work went on through the night into 14 April 1999. From the 22-metric-ton articulated train, the first bits to be lifted out of the river were three bogies each weighing roughly 3½ metric tons. These were lifted with the crane during the day over the ELBA work buildings and onto an articulated truck waiting on Ernststraße (street), which had been closed for the occasion. The fourth bogie, the one that had been torn off the train's roof in the accident and had fallen into the passenger compartment, had to be recovered later. The tail end of the articulated train could now be freed and lifted out of the riverbed. In work that took until evening, the whole train was lifted out of the Wupper after having been taken apart into three pieces. These were then transported to one of the halls at the Generaloberst-Hoepner-Kaserne (barracks) on Lichtscheid, Wuppertal's highest hill. The section of rail from the overhead track onto which the fateful claw fastener was attached was removed to a place for safekeeping on Friday 16 April 1999.

== Investigations ==
Beginning in November 1997, in the course of renovation work in the leadup to the Schwebebahn's centenary in 2001, each weekend was spent completely replacing the railway's weightbearing structure. The steel claw fastener that was attached to the guide rail served to stabilize the overhead track during this work. On the night before the accident, work had ended during which parts of the overhead track, a few piers from the accident site, had been replaced. The night's work lagged so far behind schedule that the work site was left only ten minutes before the morning's first train from the Vohwinkel direction came along. The workers were apparently in such a hurry that they forgot to remove the claw fastener.

The Technischer Überwachungsverein (TÜV) Rheinland/Berlin-Brandenburg was authorized to investigate and examine the whole process of the renovations on the stretch of the line from Pestalozzistraße station to Ohligsmühle station (each one stop from Robert-Daum-Platz station, the nearest to where the accident happened) from 9 to 12 April 1999 from the time when they began until the line was ready for use, and the documentation relating thereto, as well as the established organization for verifying safe suspension railway operation after completion of periodic building in which replacement work is done on sections of the overhead track.

In the subsequent proceedings, it became clear that the train's fall from the track did not arise from a technical defect or a systemic error. Instead the accident had been caused by careless disassembly work towards the end of that night's shift, and deficient oversight of this work. A test run that could have prevented the accident was neither planned nor prescribed by law.

== Judicial consequences ==
At the Wuppertal State Court (Landgericht), the prosecutor, Ralf Meyer, put it to the defendants, three Wuppertal City Works Corporation (WSW Wuppertaler Stadtwerke, or WSW for short) employees along with four fitters and their foreman from Lavis GmbH, the Aschaffenburg company contracted to do the renovation work on Suspension Railway, that carelessness had led to the accident. He further said that the four fitters had let every care slip when they had not removed the claw fastener from the overhead track, and that the other defendants had failed to make sure that the line was in good condition for use, despite having had the responsibility to do just that. The fitters' foreman told the court that he could not rule out the possibility of "unwittingly having made a mistake". He could not, he said, oversee all the work being done. The fitters had clearly been assigned the job of removing the claw. "I can limit myself during supervisory duties to spot checks only," he further said. He had to rely on the fitters, among whom were "experienced men", for this was, according to him, necessary. The two accused WSW inspectors who in the end had given the green light for the suspension railway to begin running on the morning in question, for their part, told the court that they had not been able to see the claw on the track because it had been too dark at the time and they had had no portable light. The works manager who had developed the safety scheme for the renovation work told the court, "I complied to the full extent with my duties," to which Mayer responded with a suggestion that the manager's safety scheme had been inadequate. The four fitters had nothing to say in response. Many of the surviving victims were on hand for the proceedings, including at least one who had been left with permanent mobility issues arising from injuries in the accident.

The accused who was responsible for the safety scheme, the works manager, and the workers who were responsible for dismantling certain equipment in the area of the accident, including the claw fitting, were each acquitted by the State Court, partly for legal reasons, partly on factual grounds. The accused who were responsible for technical or building work oversight, but who nevertheless did not carry out their supervisory functions in accordance with standards, were each found guilty by the State Court of negligent homicide in five legally concurrent cases in coincidence with negligent bodily harm in 37 legally concurrent cases, and sentenced to probation.

In the ruling handed down by the Federal Court of Justice (Bundesgerichtshof) on 31 January 2002 (4 StR 289/01), the Federal Court upheld the State Court's guilty verdicts against those who were responsible for technical or building work oversight, and the foreman's acquittal. However, after an appeal from the prosecutor's office and a third party, the Federal Court overturned the fitters' acquittals, saying that the State Court had made a legal error by dividing what was an instance of collective responsibility into separate ones by applying the "principle of reliance" (Vertrauensgrundsatz).

The case as it related to the acquitted defendants was sent back to another chamber at the Wuppertal State Court. In these proceedings, one of the workers was sentenced to four months' probation, while the administrative fine of €500 to which the other three had been sentenced was suspended.

The WSW, as the suspension railway's operator, paid some DM 1.3 million in damages, for pain and suffering, for medical treatment and for burial costs, as well as for specialists to help the bereaved and others affected by the accident overcome their psychological trauma. The total cost to the Corporation from the Wuppertal Suspension Railway accident ran to well over DM 8 million. In a press release dated 30 September 2000, the WSW acknowledged that the Wuppertal Suspension Railway accident had badly affected some people's health and psychological wellbeing, not only victims in the accident itself, but also their kin. The WSW also declared in the release that in future it would lend those affected any conceivable help in the form of counselling, support and financial compensation, even after the legal proceedings were over. This included two telephone numbers at which callers could speak to advisers. An ombudsman was appointed to help those affected in their dealings with all questions relating to the accident's consequences. The release also dealt with questions about safety raised at the legal proceedings. While admitting that the improvements to the safety plan that had been introduced in June 1999, only two months after the accident, could not yet properly be evaluated – the responsibility for that lay with the Technical Oversight Authority (Technische Aufsichtsbehörde) in the local Regierungsbezirk – the WSW also pointed out that questions raised in court repeatedly about the train's and the track's safety had to be seen alongside the lack of any such deficiencies that could be found by an expert consultant hired by the public prosecutor's office (Staatsanwaltschaft). The release ended with the WSW stating that it would not comment on the court’s guilty verdicts against the accused.

== Technical consequences ==
Repair work was undertaken by WSW suspension railway workshop employees once extensive structural evaluations of overhead track support installation and of the effects wrought by the accident itself on the overhead track had been done by outside engineering consultants and other experts. Many safety tests were undertaken, among them a special inspection of the whole overhead track, including supports and test runs with the five articulated trains that since the accident had been the main and secondary foci of attention among the rolling stock. Extensive shunting work was necessary at the line's two termini, Vohwinkel and Oberbarmen to bring the trains into working order.

Preparatory work for the repairs to the damaged parts of the overhead track at the accident site was begun on 31 May 1999, after the crane needed for replacing overhead track parts had been set up on ELBA's property a few days earlier. The actual repair work, involving the replacement of roughly 5 m (16 ft) of rail support, running rail and current rail, began at midday on 2 June 1999. It is now established practice to do test runs after such work, even if this is still not required by law. The Schwebebahn was opened back up to the public on 8 June 1999, some eight weeks after the accident. After being examined, the piece of rolling stock damaged in the accident, car number 4, was scrapped and not replaced.

== Public memorials ==
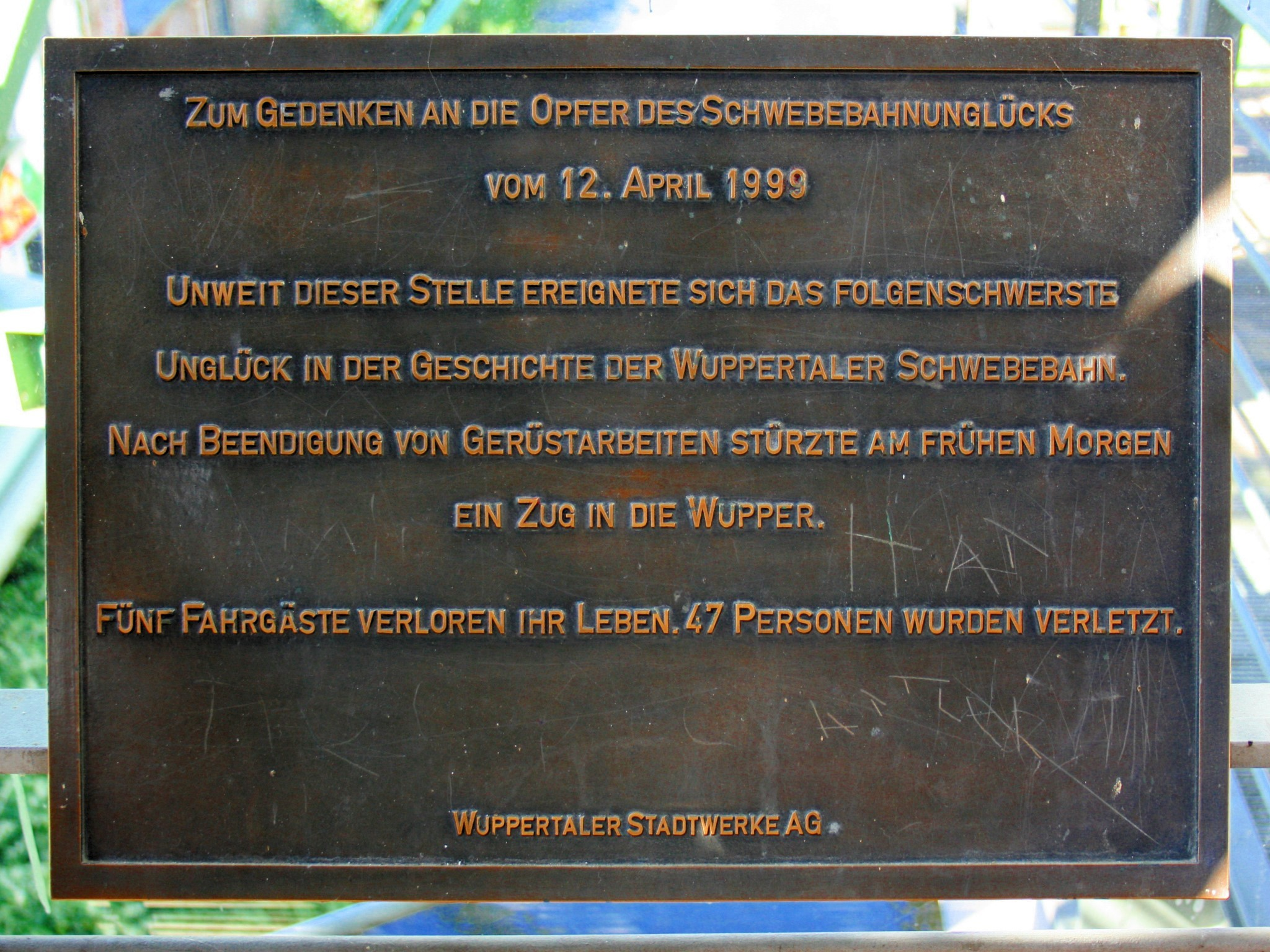
Memorial plaque at Robert-Daum-Platz station

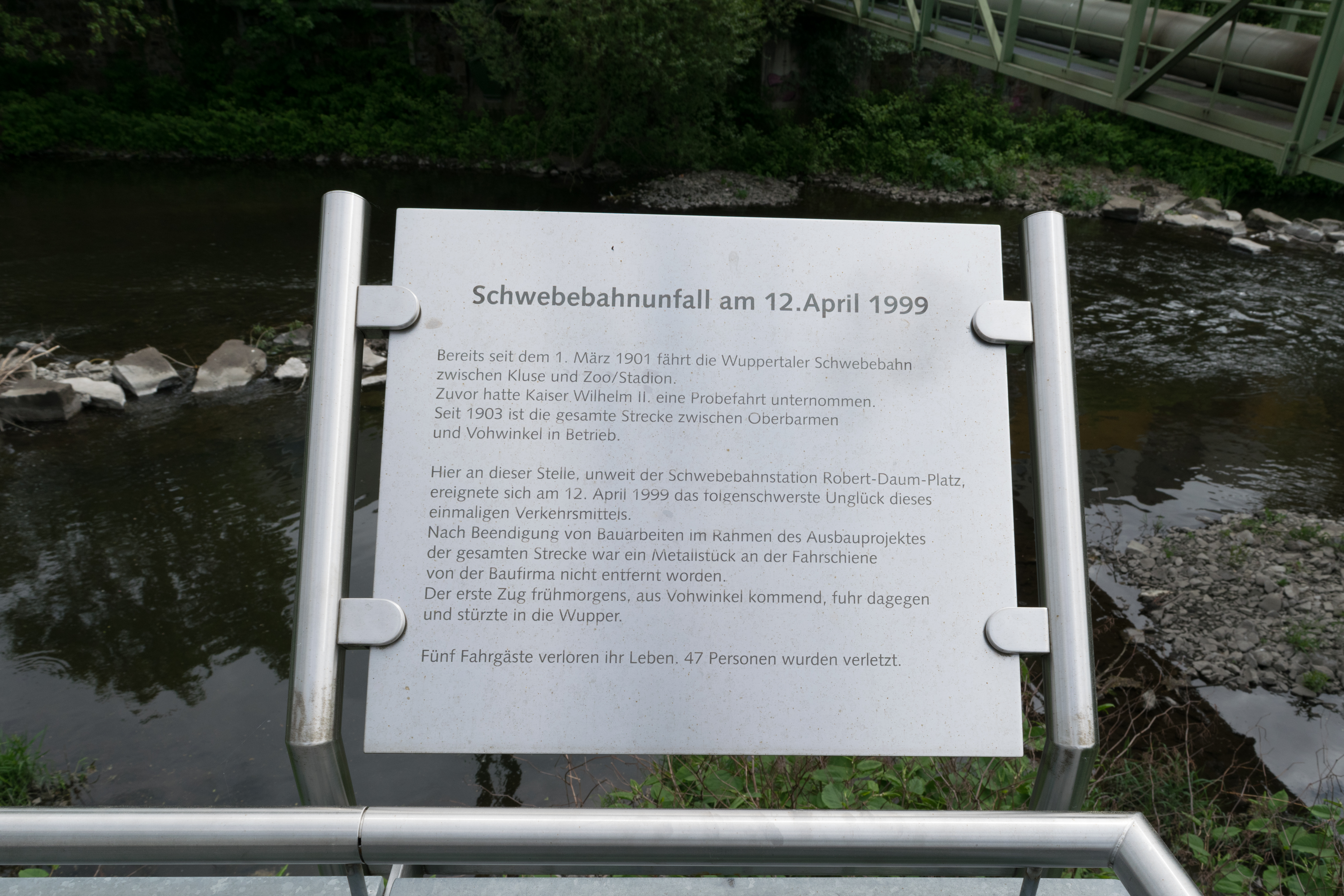
Memorial plaque at the accident site

On 12 April 2000, the first anniversary of the accident, Wuppertal's chief mayor (Oberbürgermeister) Hans Kremendahl and WSW's chairman of the board Rolf Krumsiek unveiled a memorial plaque to the victims of the accident. It can be found at Robert-Daum-Platz station. Later, on 18 April 2009, days after the accident's tenth anniversary, another memorial plaque was unveiled at a spot much nearer the accident site, on the north bank of the Wupper, a few metres (yards) from the steam pipe bridge onto which the train fell (and which has since been repaired).
