= Wuppertal Schwebebahn =

Suspension railway in Wuppertal, Germany (opened 1901)

Coordinates: 51°16′1.52″N 7°10′53.13″E

Wuppertaler Schwebebahn

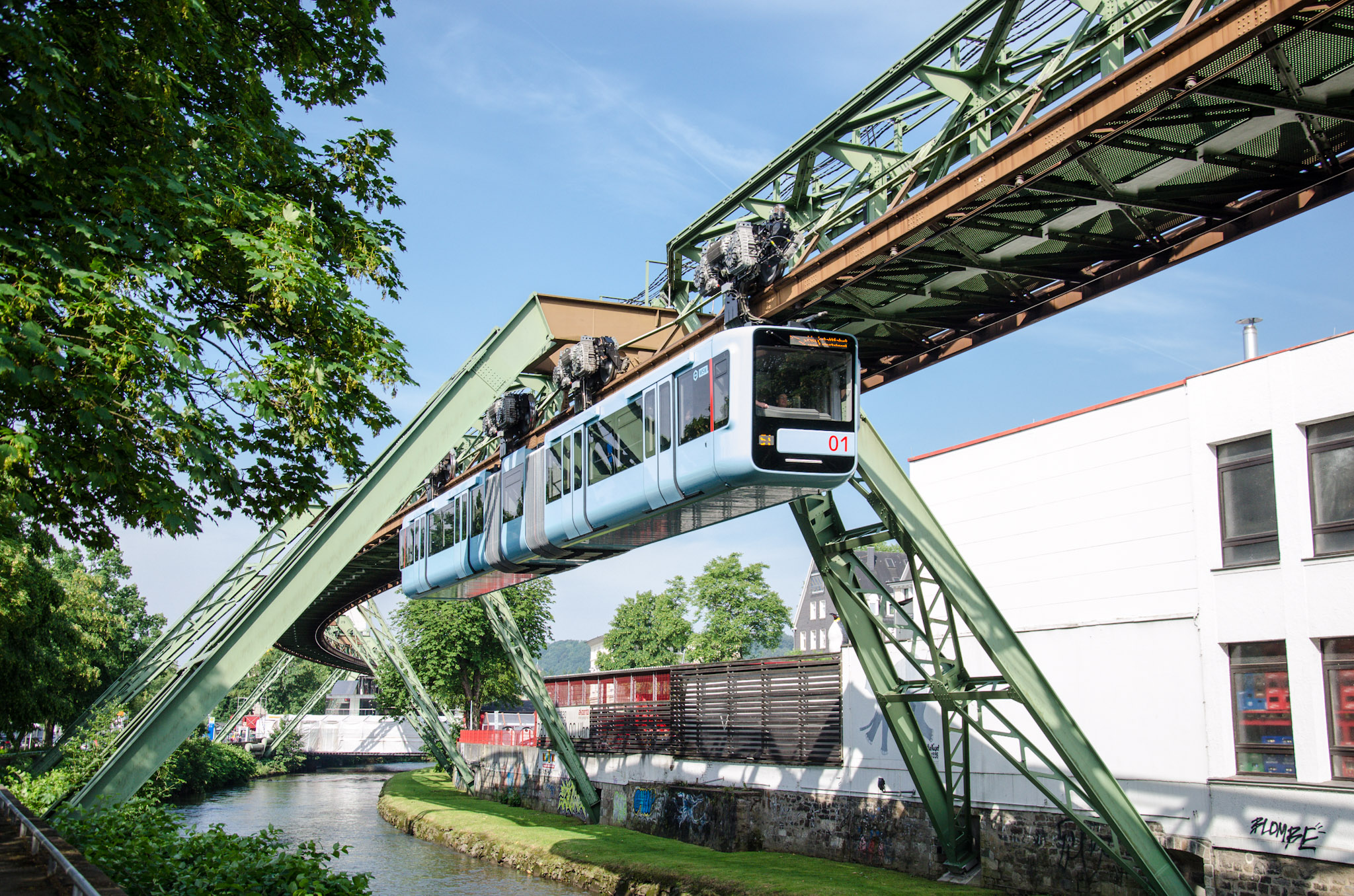
- Schwebebahn between Adlerbrücke and Alter Markt

Overview
- Locale: Wuppertal, Germany
- Transit type: Suspension railway
- Number of stations: 20
- Daily ridership: 82,000

Operation
- Began operation: 1 March 1901; 125 years ago
- Operator: Wuppertaler Stadtwerke (WSW)
- Character: Elevated

Technical
- System length: 13.3 km (8.3 mi)
- Average speed: 25.6 km/h (15.9 mph)
- Top speed: 60 km/h (37 mph)
System map
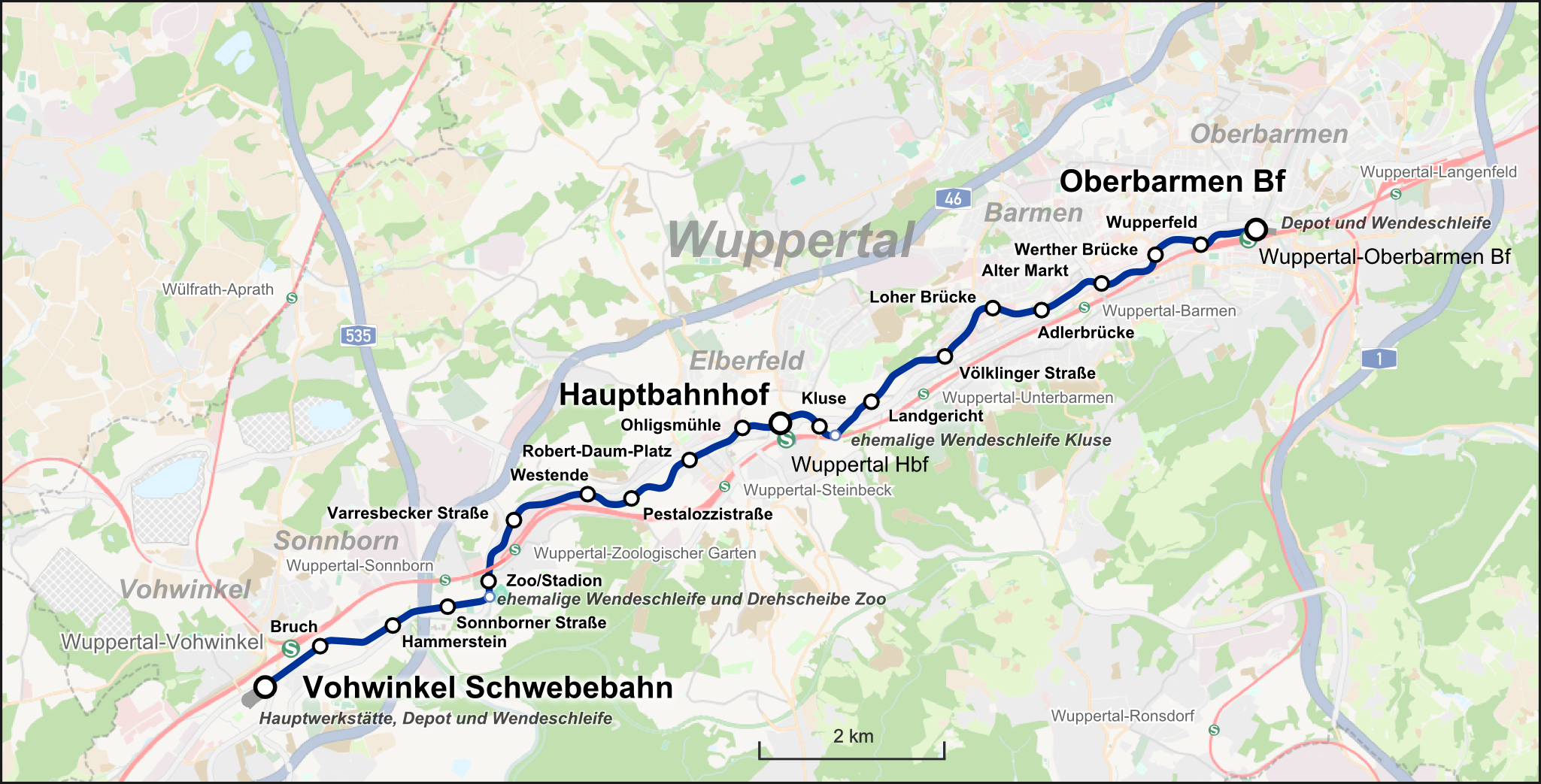

The Wuppertaler Schwebebahn (lit. 'Wuppertal Suspension Railway') is a suspension railway in Wuppertal, Germany. The line was originally called Einschienige Hängebahn System Eugen Langen (lit. 'Single-Rail Hanging Railway, System of Eugen Langen') named after its inventor, Eugen Langen. It is the oldest electric elevated railway with hanging cars in the world. Being grade-separated, it is considered rapid transit.

Langen first offered the technology to the cities of Berlin, Munich, and Breslau which all turned it down. However, the towns of Barmen, Elberfeld, and Vohwinkel along the banks of the river Wupper were intrigued by the technology’s ability to connect their communities. The elevated tracks and stations were built between 1897 and 1903; the first track opened in 1901. The railway line is credited with growth of the original cities and their eventual merger into Wuppertal. The Schwebebahn is still in use as a local public transport line, moving 25 million passengers annually, per the 2008 annual report. New rail cars were ordered in 2015, called Generation 15, and the first new car went into service in December 2016.

The Schwebebahn runs along a route of 13.3 kilometres (8.3 mi), at a height of about 12 metres (39 ft) above the river Wupper between Oberbarmen and Sonnborner Straße (10 kilometres or 6.2 miles) and about 8 metres (26 ft) above the valley road between Sonnborner Straße and Vohwinkel (3.3 kilometres or 2.1 miles). At one point the railway crosses the A46 motorway. The entire trip takes about 30 minutes. The Schwebebahn operates within the Verkehrsverbund Rhein-Ruhr (VRR) and accepts tickets issued by the VRR companies including the Deutschlandticket.

== History ==
The Wuppertaler Schwebebahn had a forerunner: in 1824, Henry Robinson Palmer of Britain presented a railway system which differed from all previous constructions. It was a low single-rail suspension railway on which the carriages were drawn by horses. Friedrich Harkort, a Prussian industrial entrepreneur and politician, loved the idea. He saw big advantages for the transport of coal to the early industrialised region in and around the Wupper valley. Harkort had his own steel mill in Elberfeld; he built a demonstration segment of the Palmer system and set it up in 1826 on the grounds of what is today the Wuppertal tax office. He tried to attract public attention to his railway plans.

On 9 September 1826, the town councillors of Elberfeld met to discuss the use of a "Palmer's Railway" from the Ruhr region, Hinsbeck, or Langenberg, to the Wupper valley, Elberfeld, connecting Harkort's factories. Friedrich Harkort inspected the projected route with a surveyor and a member of the town council. The plans never went ahead because of protests from the transport branch and owners of mills that were not on the routes.

In 1887 the cities of Elberfeld and Barmen formed a commission for the construction of an elevated railway or Hochbahn. In 1894 they chose the system of the engineer Eugen Langen of Cologne, and in 1896 the order was licensed by the City of Düsseldorf. In 2003, the Rhine Heritage Office (Rheinisches Amt für Denkmalpflege des Landschaftsverbandes Rheinland or LVR) announced the discovery of an original section of the test route of the Schwebebahn.

Construction on the Schwebebahn began in 1898, overseen by the government's master builder, Wilhelm Feldmann. On 24 October 1900, Emperor Wilhelm II participated in a monorail trial run.

In 1901 the railway came into operation. It opened in sections: the line from Kluse to Zoo/Stadion opened on 1 March, the line to the western terminus at Vohwinkel opened on 24 May; the line to the eastern terminus at Oberbarmen opened on 27 June 1903. Around 19,200 tonnes (18,900 long tons; 21,200 short tons) of steel were used to produce the supporting frame and the stations. The construction cost 16 million gold marks. The railway was closed owing to severe damage during World War II, but reopened in 1946.

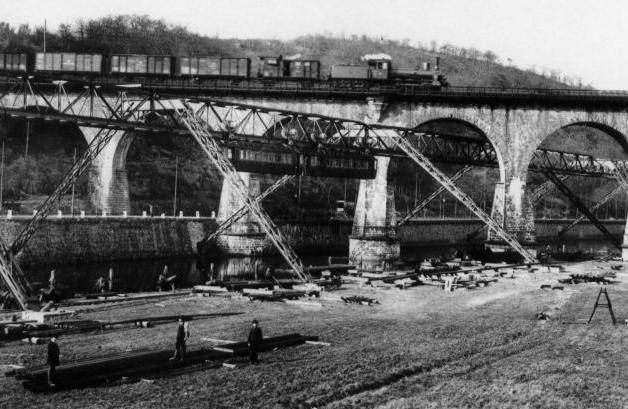
Construction of the Schwebebahn, 1900

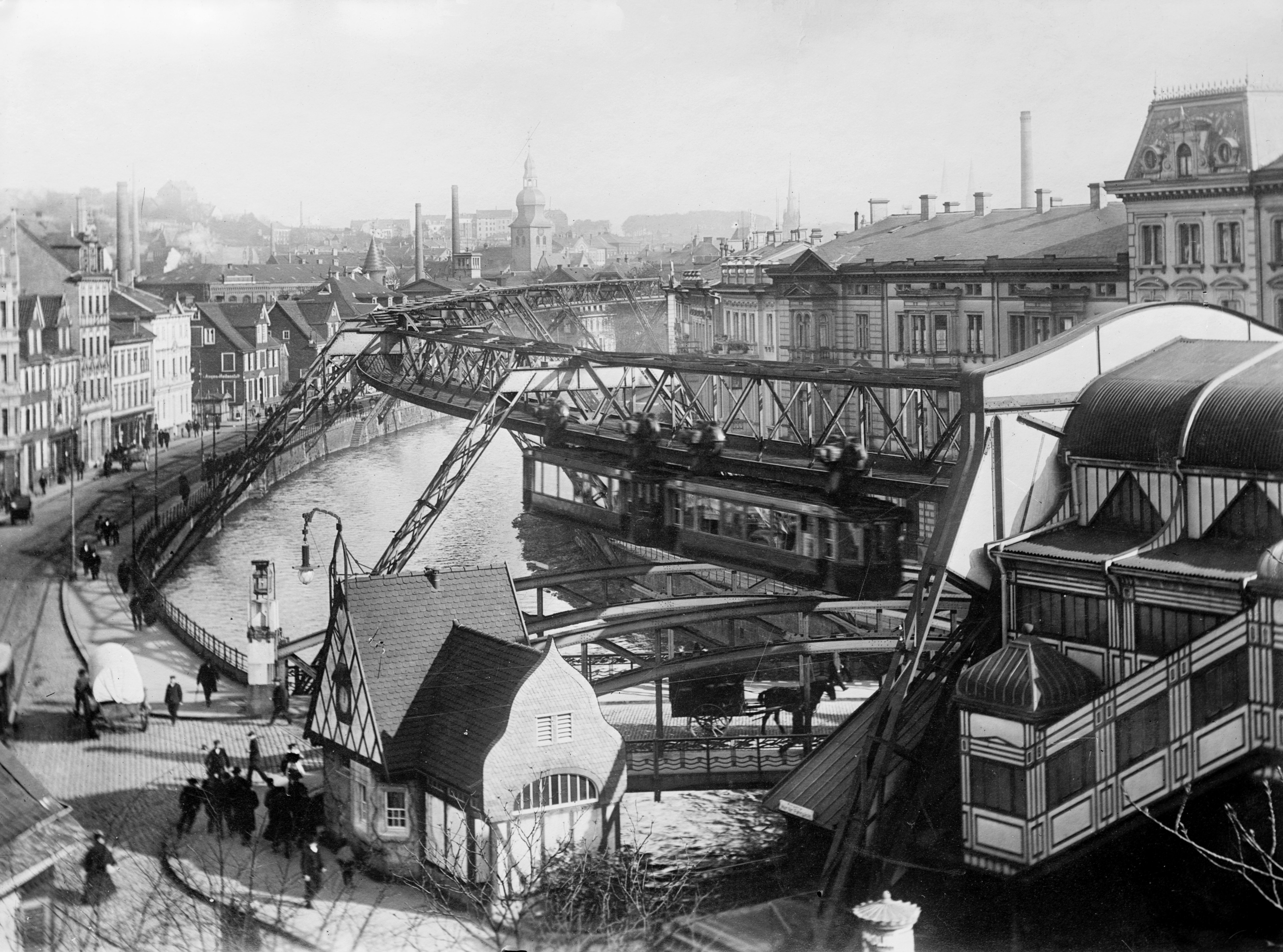
Werther Brücke station in 1913

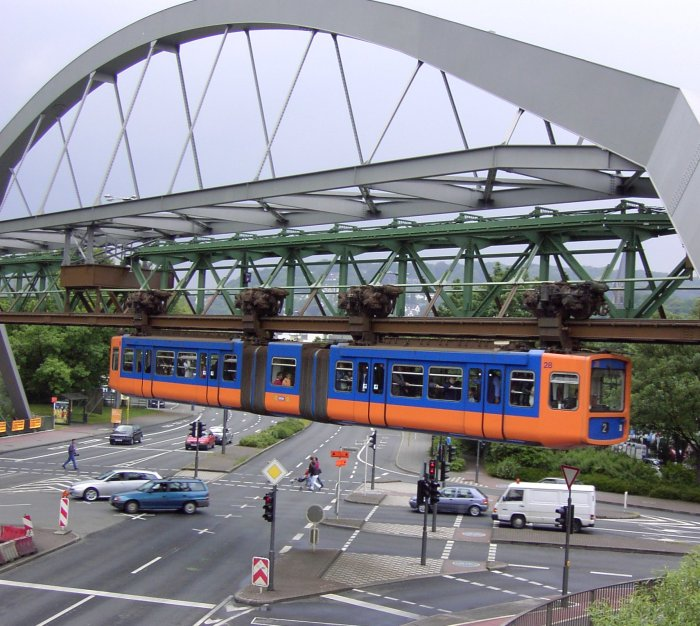
A GTW 72 train crossing an intersection

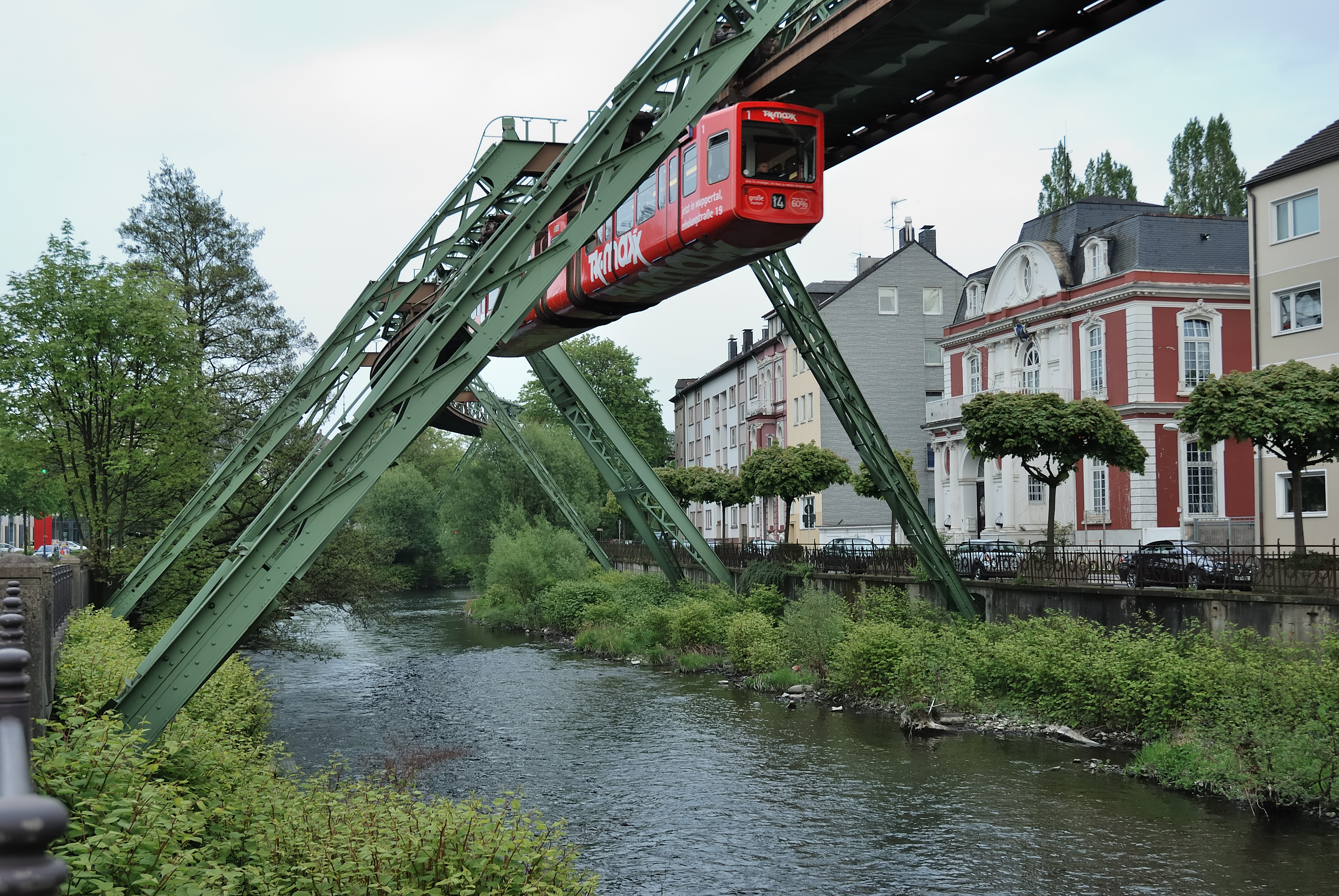
A train in Wuppertal in 2010

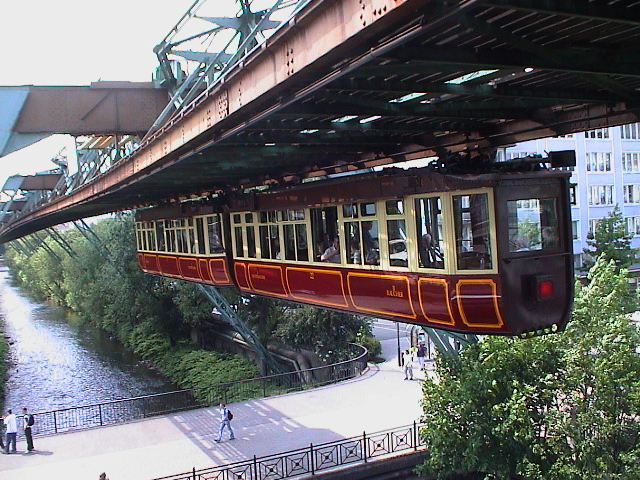
The Kaiserwagen

=== Modernization ===
The Schwebebahn carries approximately 80,000 passengers through the city per weekday. Since 1997, the supporting frame has been largely modernized, and many stations have been reconstructed and brought up to date technically. Kluse station, at the theatre in Elberfeld, was destroyed during the Second World War and was reconstructed during the modernization phase. Work was planned to be completed in 2001, but a serious accident took place in 1999 which left five people dead and 47 injured. That, along with delivery problems, delayed completion. By 2004, the cost of the reconstruction work had increased from €380 million to €480 million.

On 15 December 2009, the Schwebebahn suspended its operations due to safety concerns. Several of the older support structures needed to be renewed, a process that was completed on 19 April 2010.

In 2012, the Schwebebahn was closed for significant periods to allow upgrades to the system: from 7 to 21 July and 6 August to 22 October, and on weekends in September (15/16) and November (10/11). The modernization was completed and the line fully reopened on 19 August 2013.

In November 2018 a bus bar detached and fell to the ground but nobody was injured. Following this accident, the Schwebebahn was closed down for nearly nine months. It re-opened on 1 August 2019.

=== Generation 15 trains ===
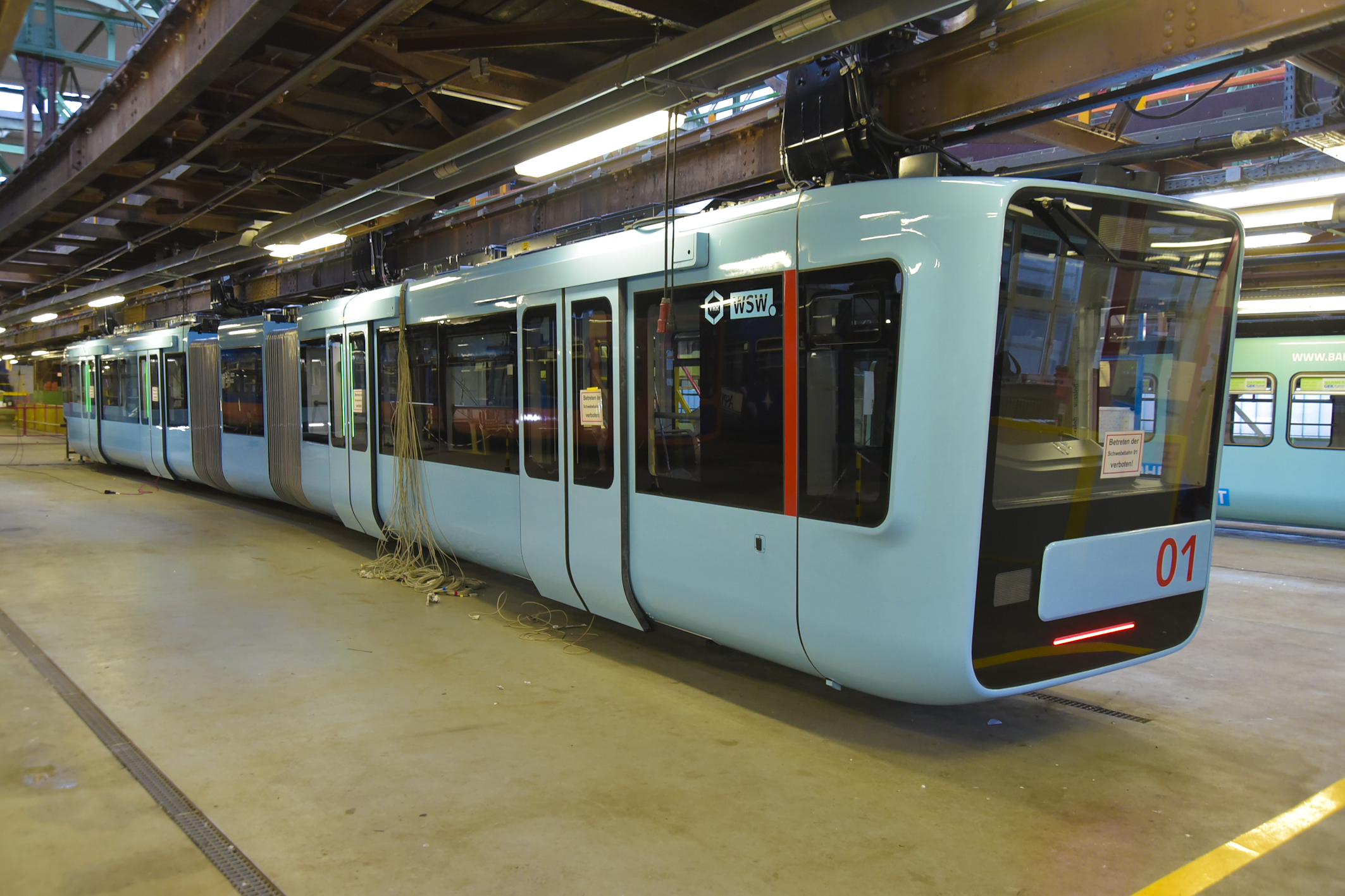
Generation 15 train at Vohwinkel depot

On 10 November 2011, Wuppertaler Stadtwerke signed a contract with Vossloh Kiepe to supply a new fleet of Generation 15 trains, technically named GTW 14, to gradually replace the ageing GTW 72 fleet. The 31 new articulated cars were assembled by Vossloh España in Valencia, Spain, featuring a light blue livery and having cushioned seating, air conditioning, information displays, LED lights, improved disabled access, and induction motors with energy recovery during braking. The first new train was commissioned by WSW in November 2015, started test rides in February 2016 and the first five vehicles entered regular passenger service on 18 December 2016, at which point the line's power supply voltage was raised from 600 to 750 V.

The GTW 72 stock was gradually withdrawn from service as the new trains were introduced, the last of which operated immediately prior to the line's shutdown in November 2018. WSW announced it would not scrap any of the GTW 72 stock, but instead offer 21 of the vehicles for sale and three for free, as long as they remained in the city of Wuppertal.

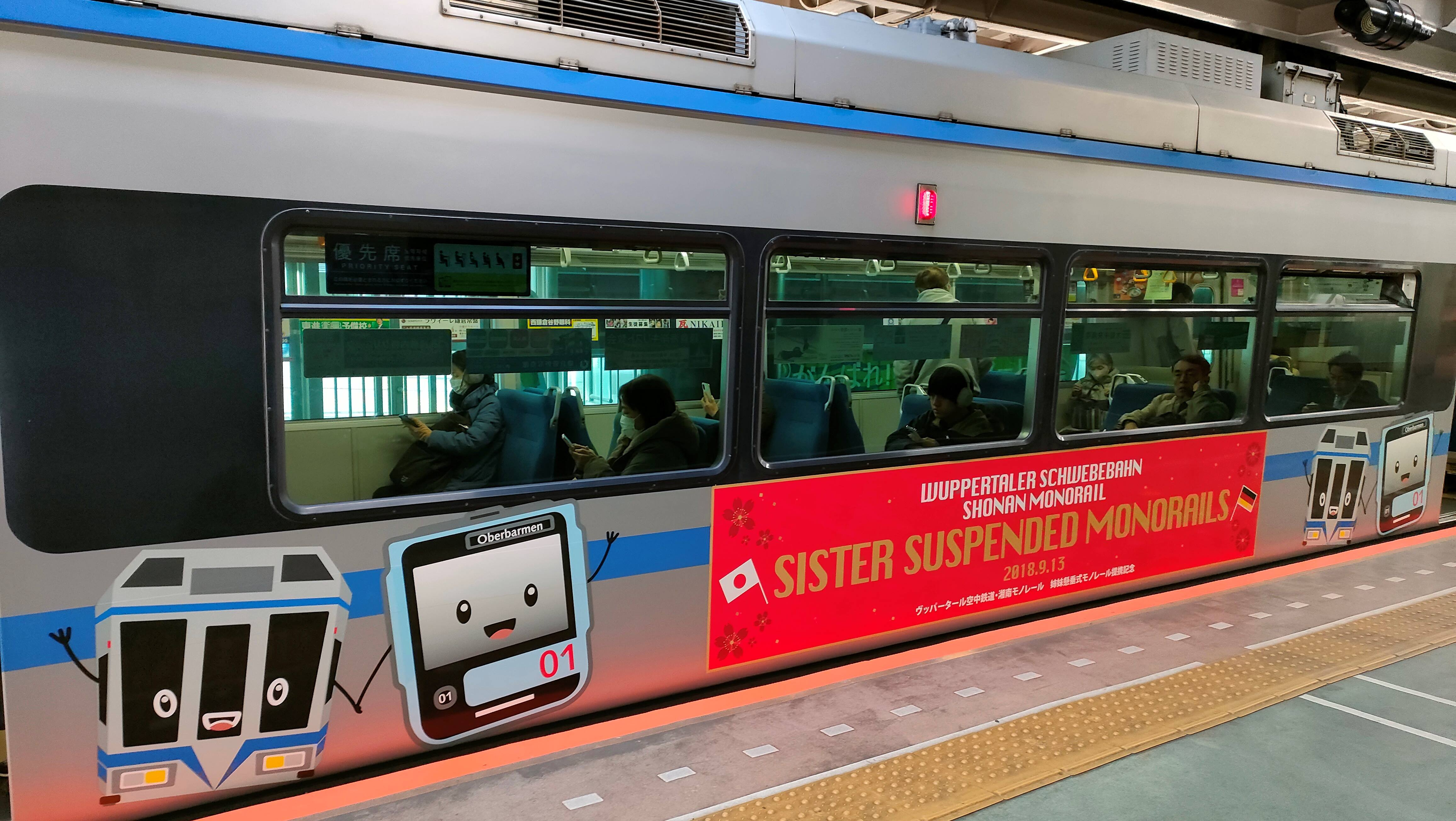
The Shonan Monorail, Japan, showing its relationship with Wuppertaler Schwebebahn

=== Sister suspension railway ===
Wuppertal Schwebebahn has a sister suspension railway relationships with Shonan Monorail since 2018. Shonan Monorail is a suspension railway located in Kanagawa, Japan and connects the cities between Kamakura and Fujisawa. Starting in 2018, both suspension railways made a campaign of their twinning.

== Stations ==
- Oberbarmen – eastern terminus
- Wupperfeld
- Werther Brücke
- Alter Markt
- Adlerbrücke (Opernhaus)
- Loher Brücke (Junior-Uni)
- Völklinger Straße
- Landgericht
- Kluse
- Hauptbahnhof (Döppersberg)
- Ohligsmühle
- Robert-Daum-Platz
- Pestalozzistraße
- Westende
- Varresbecker Straße
- Zoo/Stadion
- Sonnborner Straße
- Hammerstein
- Bruch
- Vohwinkel – western terminus
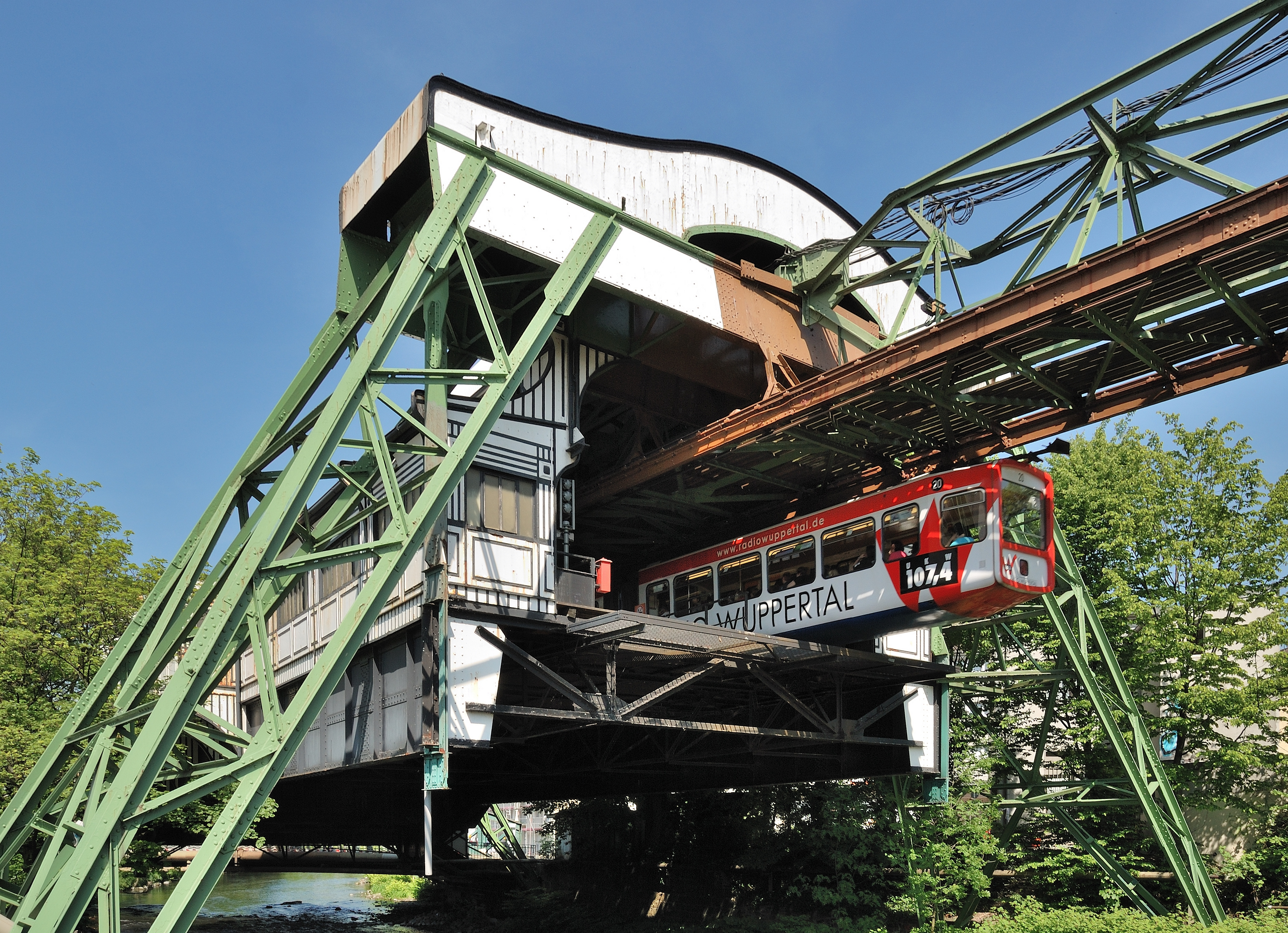
Werther Brücke station

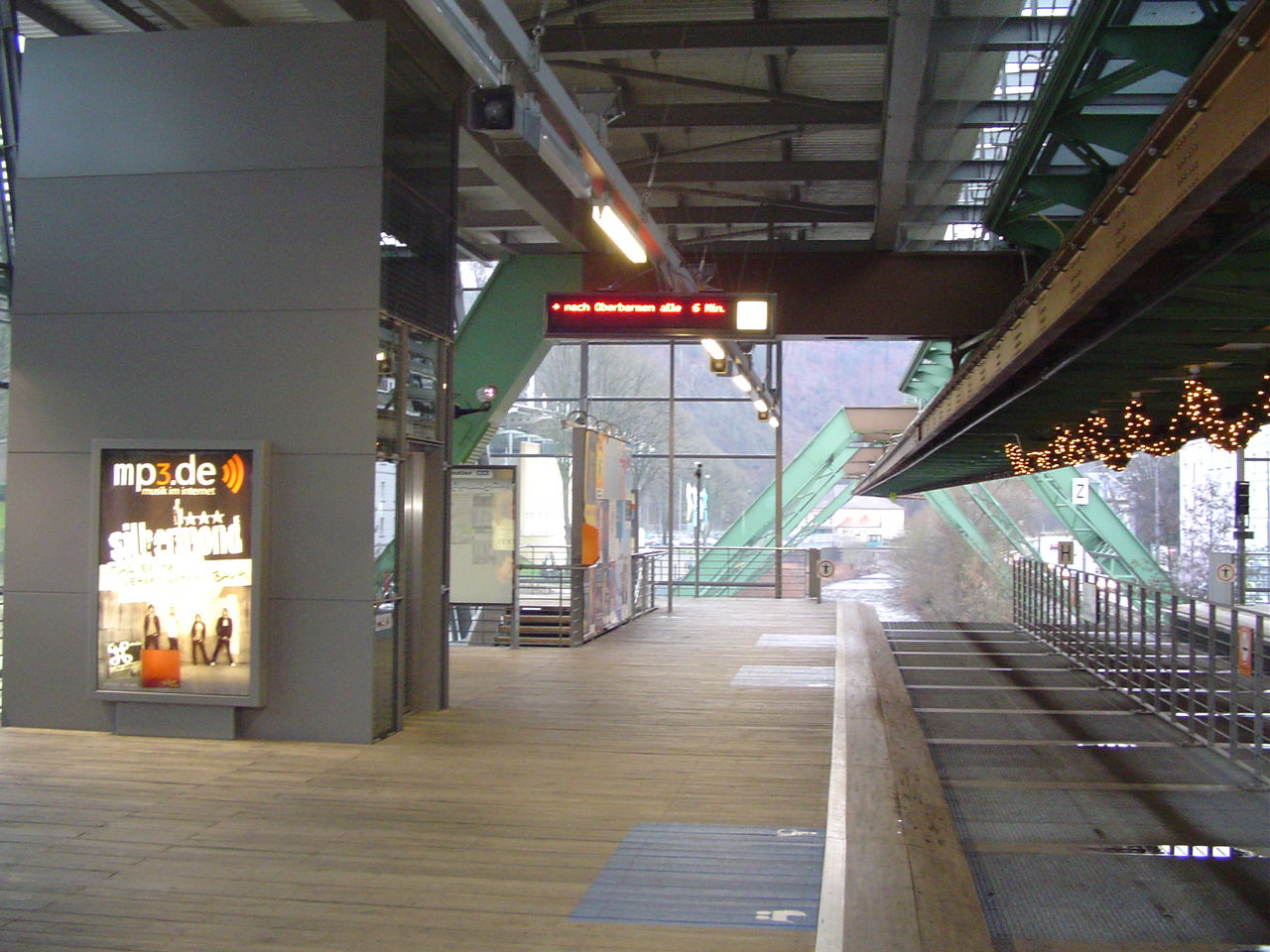
Zoo/Stadion station

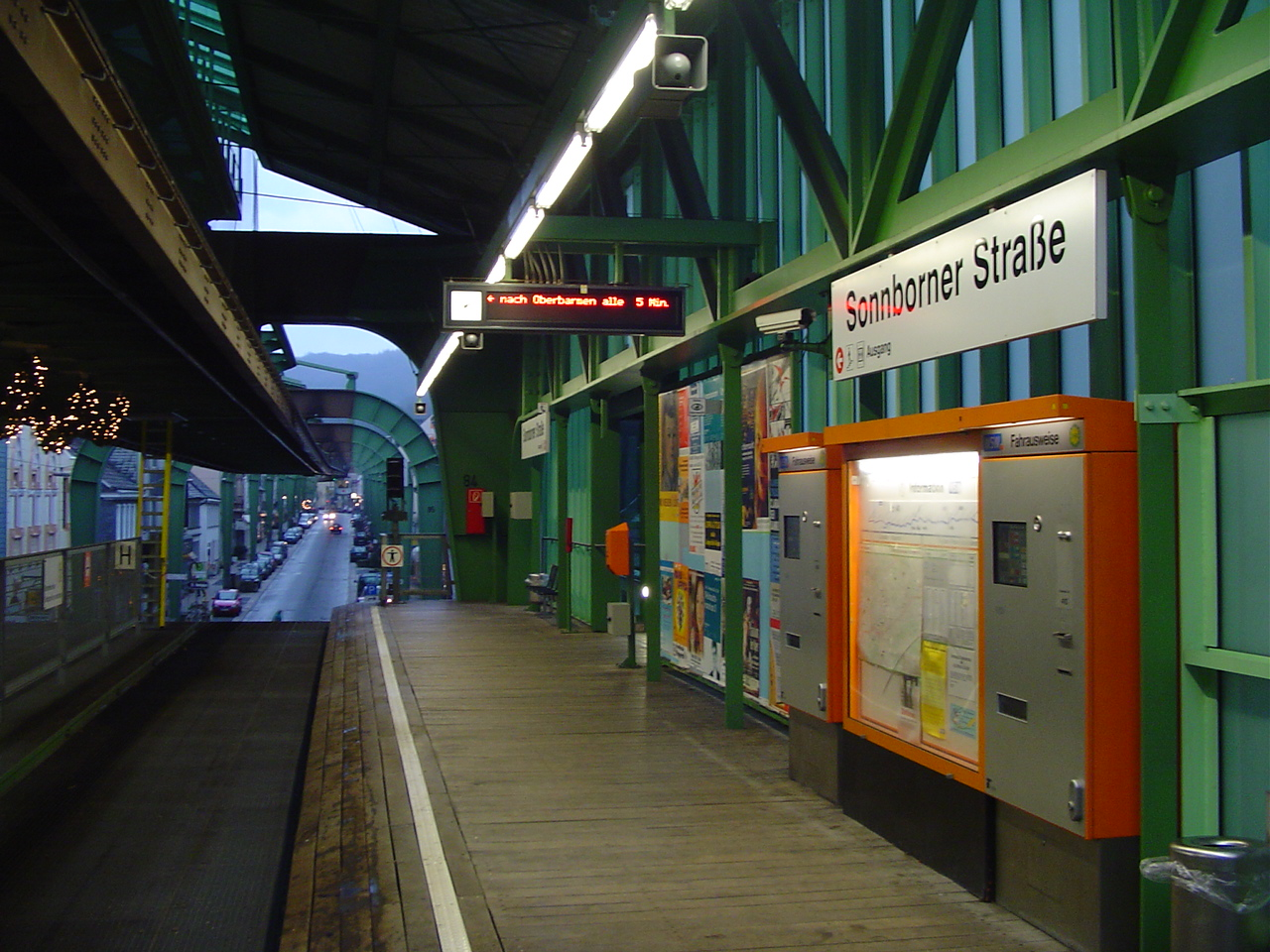
Sonnborner Straße station

== Technology ==
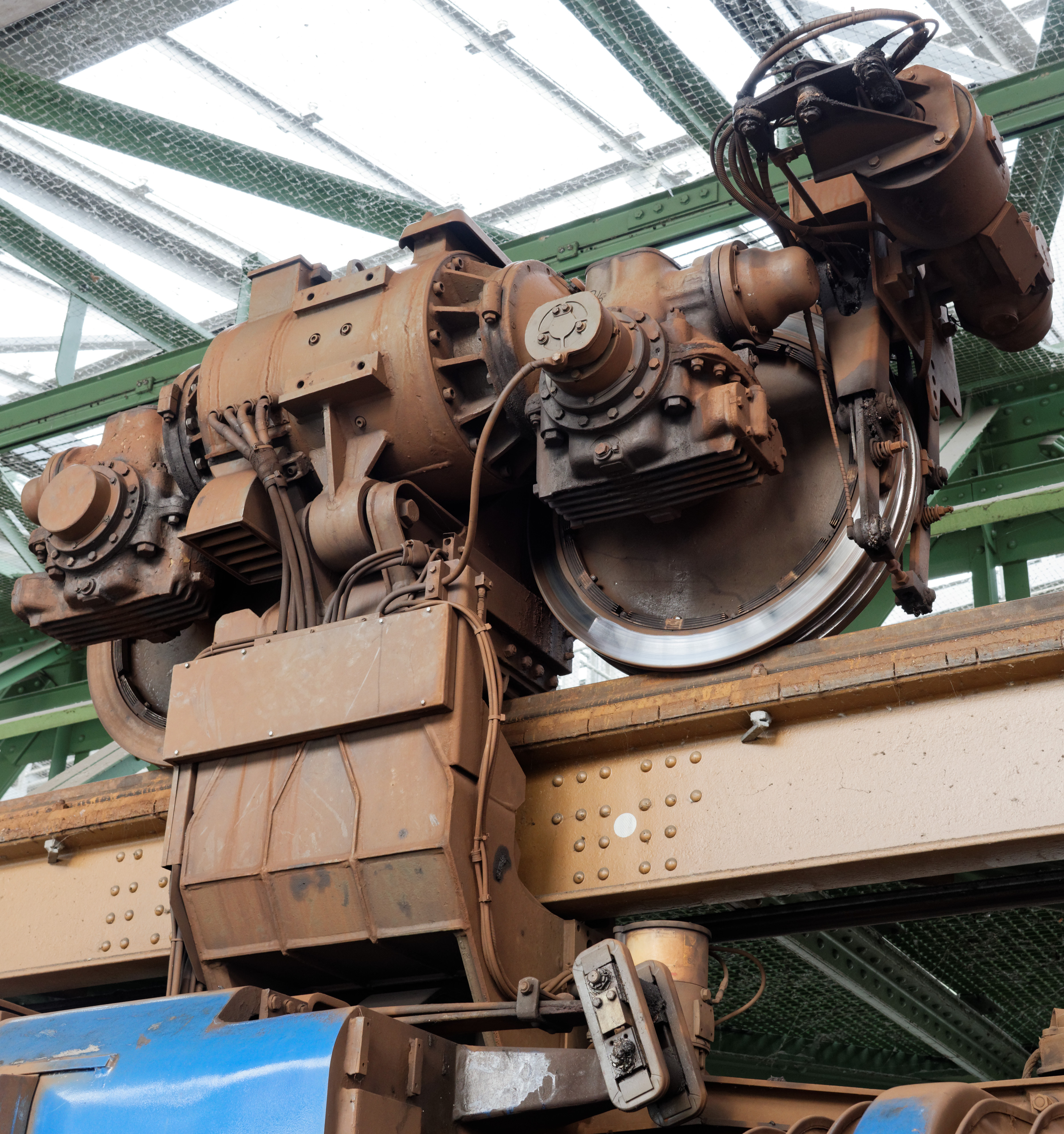
Detail of suspender, wheel, and engine of a GTW 72 train

The cars are suspended from a single rail built underneath a supporting steel frame. The cars hang on wheels which are driven by multiple electric motors operating at 600 or 750 V DC, fed from a live rail below the running rail.

Wuppertal Schwebebahn, 2026

Until August 2019, the Schwebebahn used block signalling like other light- and heavy-rail systems. Signals with red, green, and yellow lights, present at every station, signalled the driver if the next block, usually continuing until the next station, was free or not. The yellow aspect was mostly used to warn about construction work ahead, while a blinking red light warned about more severe problems. Today, the Schwebebahn uses the European Train Control System, allowing for shorter distances between trains.

The supporting frame and tracks are made out of 486 pillars and bridgework sections. When the line was originally built, Anton Rieppel, head of MAN-Werk Gustavsburg, designed the structural system, which he patented. At each end of the line is a servicing depot, including a loop of track to allow the trains to be turned around.

The current fleet consists of 31 articulated cars. The cars are 24 metres long and have 4 doors. One carriage can seat 42 fix plus 3 on jump seats in the wheelchair area with 130 standing passengers permitted. The top speed is 60 kilometres per hour (37 mph) and the average speed is 27 km/h (17 mph).

The Kaiserwagen (Emperor's car), the original train used by Emperor Wilhelm II during a test ride on 24 October 1900, is still operated on scheduled excursion services, special occasions and for charter events.

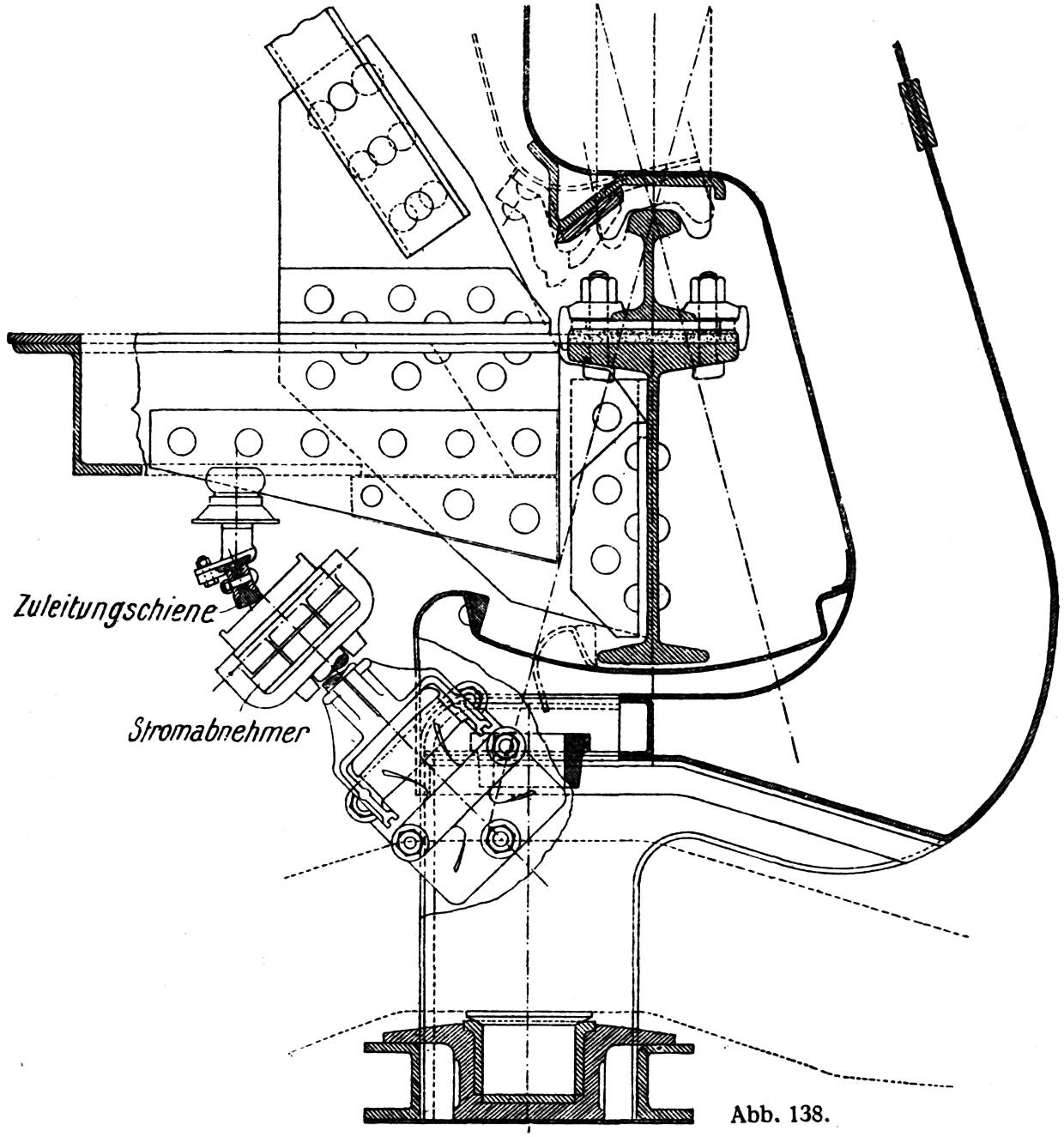
The mechanism of the train

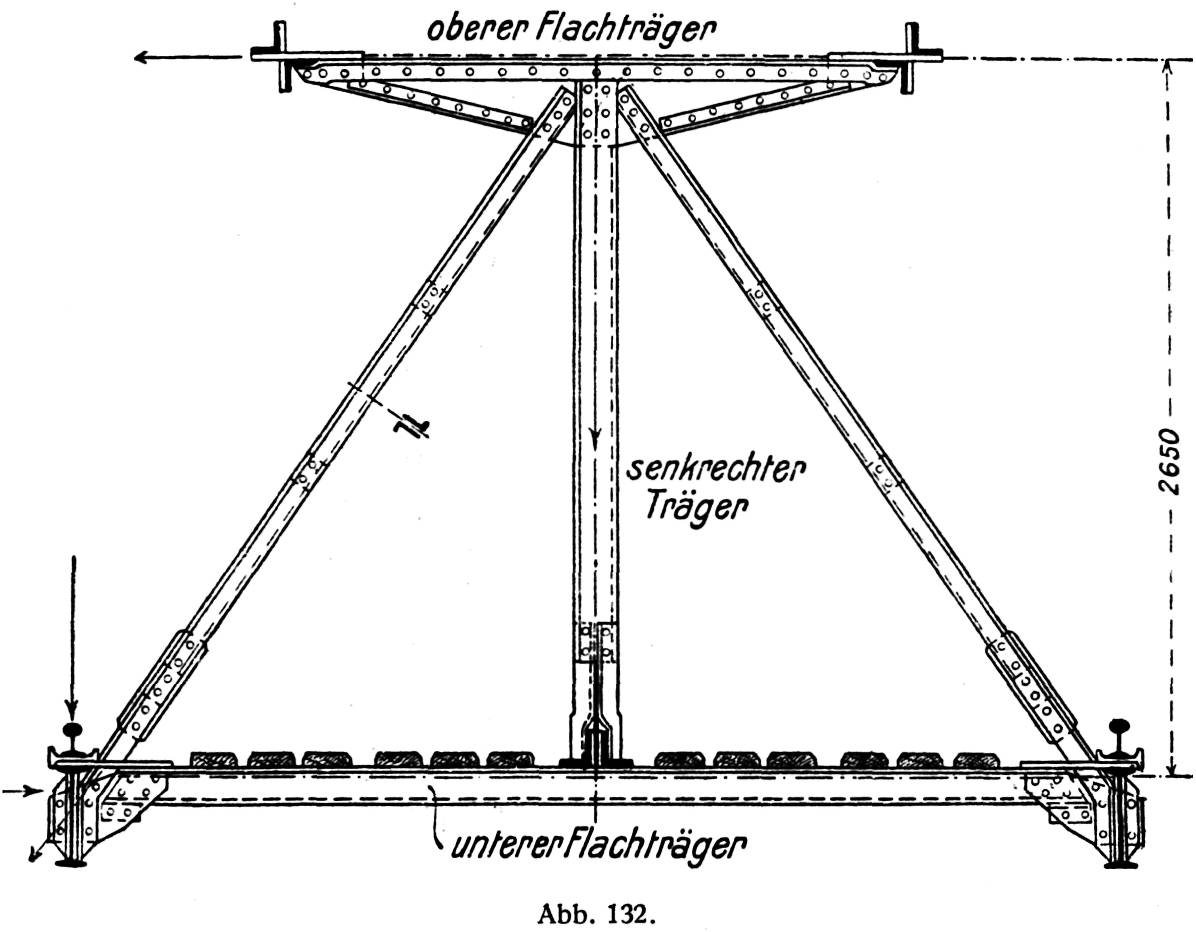
The nutted carrier on the track, also known as Pendelstütze

The main station, Hbf, over the Italian restaurant

The stabilizing track carrier, the Ankerstütze

Staircase option: Go up the starcase, choose the drection

The local suspension bridge over the intersection

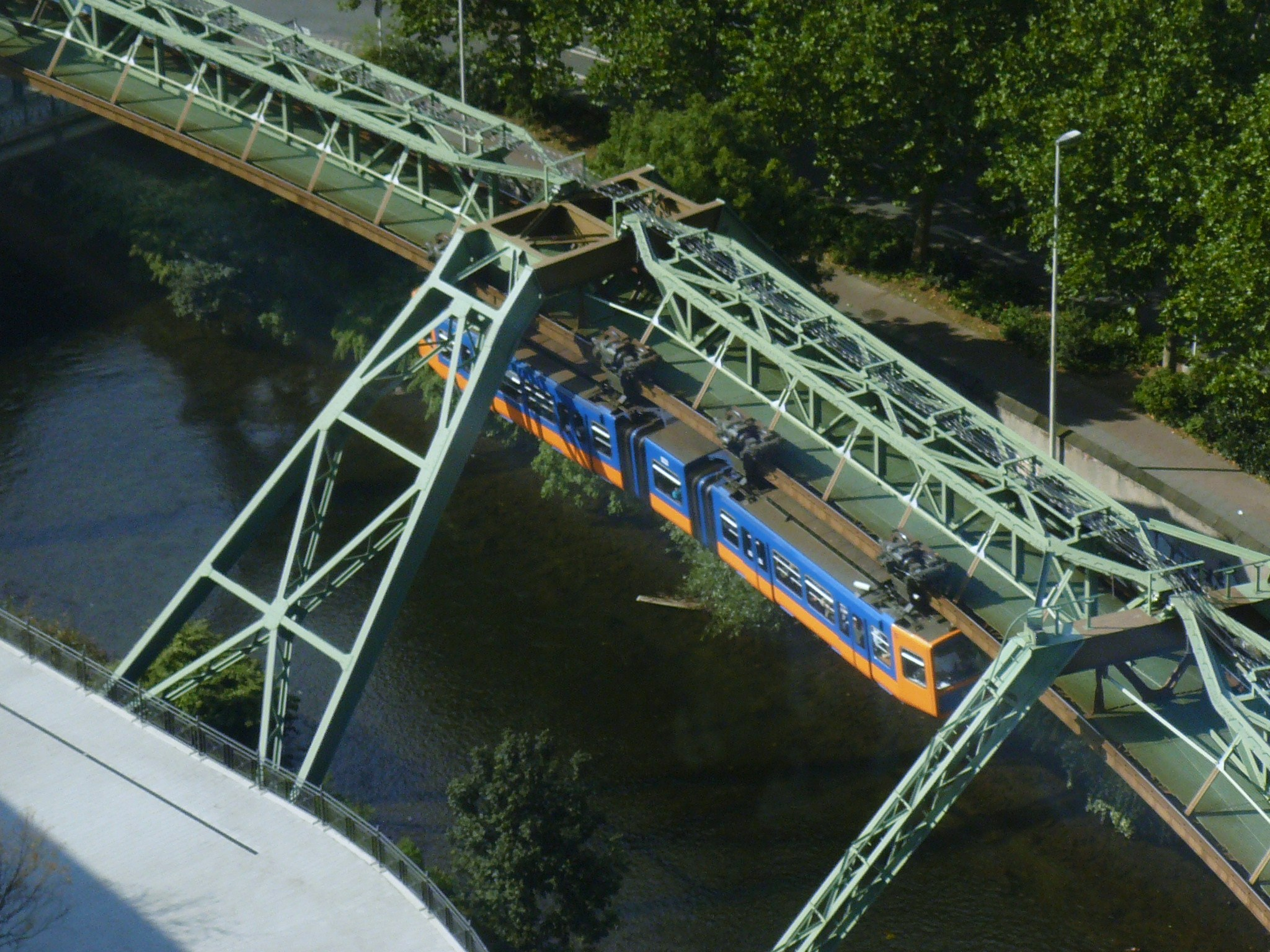
The track and the carrier. The bridge, or Rieppel holder, connects the carriers

The UH knot

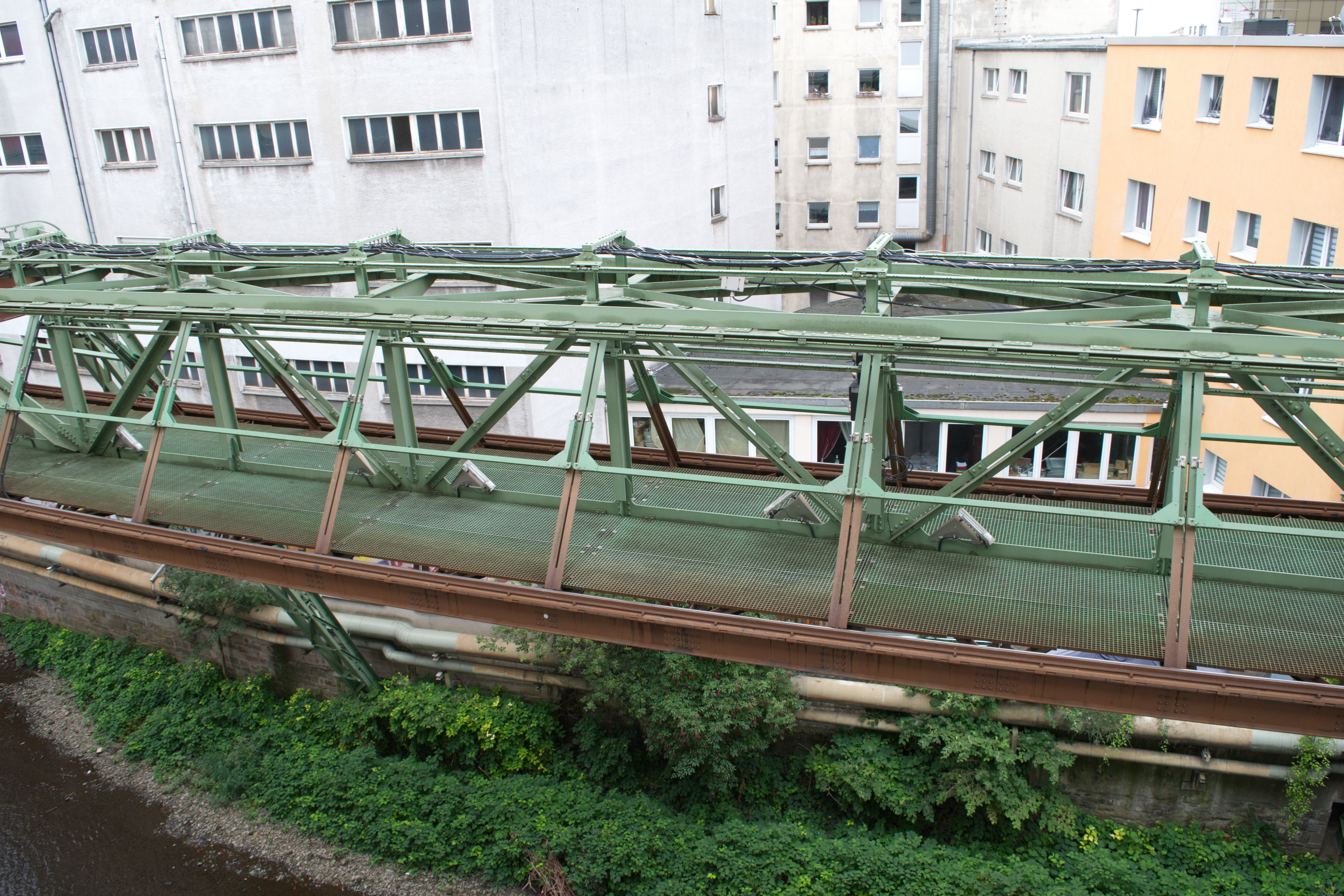
Nodal bridge

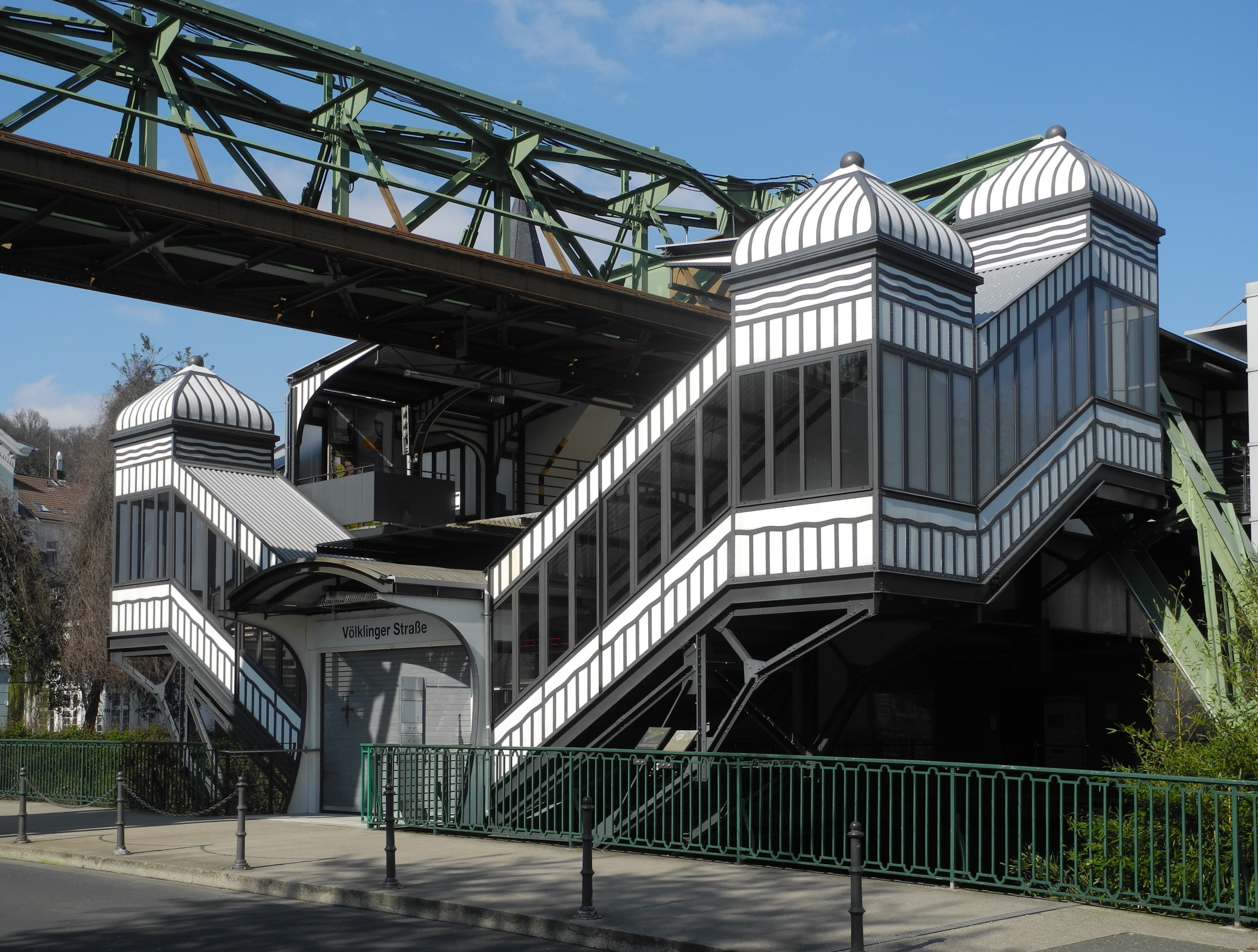
Early station design: Staircases, towers and windows

Station pair from 1974

== Incidents ==
15 January 1917
A train rear-ended another train that had stopped unexpectedly in front of it between Oberbarmen and Wupperfeld, causing the trailing car of the stopped train to fall off the track. There were two minor injuries. Subsequently, a safety device was developed to make derailments nearly impossible.
21 July 1950
The Althoff Circus organised a publicity stunt by putting a baby elephant on a train at Alter Markt station. As the elephant started to bump around during the ride, she fell out of the car and into the river Wupper. The elephant, two journalists, and one passenger sustained minor injuries. After that jump, the elephant got the name Tuffi, meaning 'waterdive' in Italian. The official of the railway and the circus director were fined after the incident.
11 September 1968
A truck crashed and caused a section of track to fall. There were no trains in the area at the time. This incident led to the use of concrete barriers around the pillar anchors.
25 March 1997
A technical malfunction caused a rear-end collision in Oberbarmen station between a structure train and the Kaiserwagen. There were 14 injuries, but no derailment.
12 April 1999

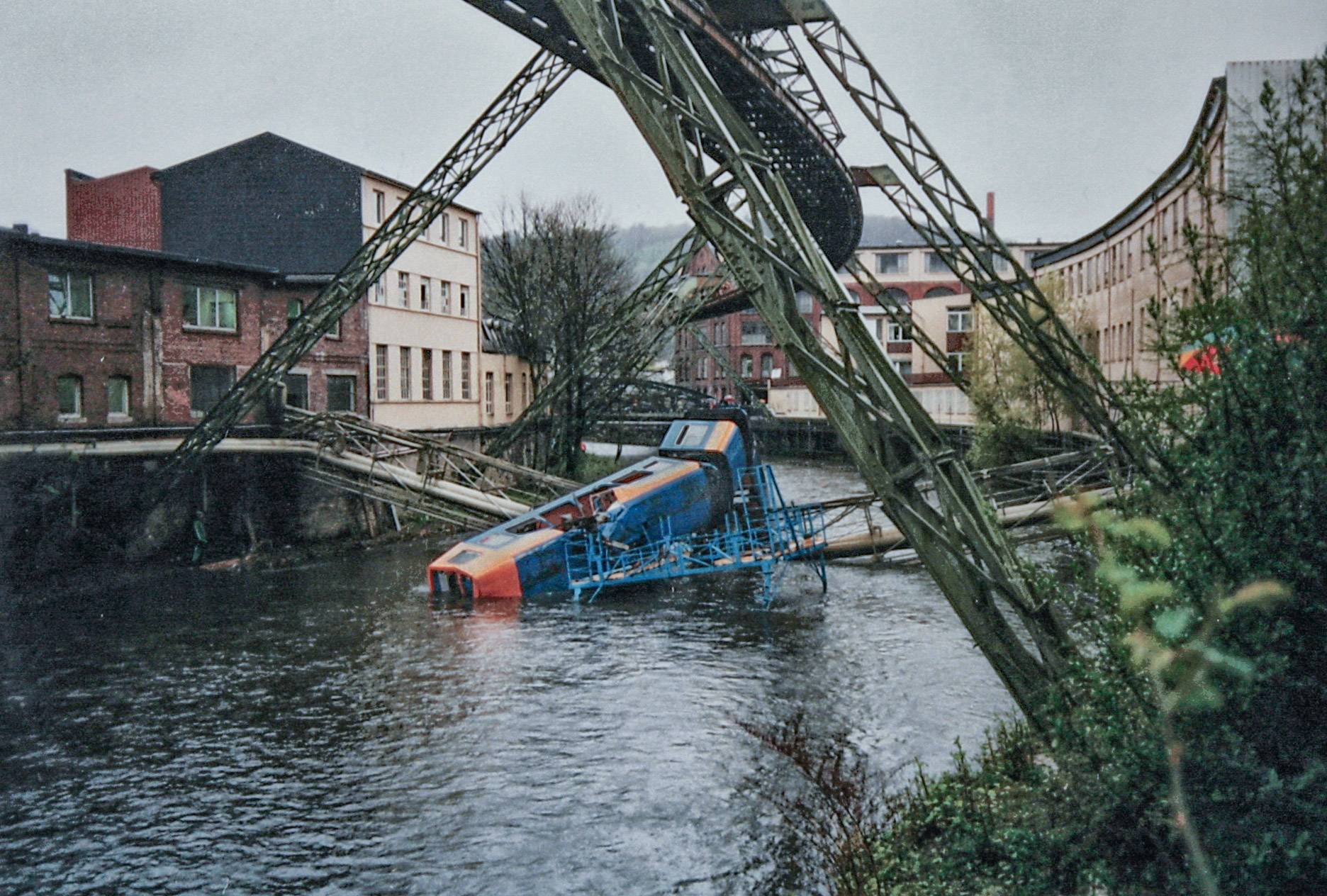
Accident on 12 April 1999, near Robert-Daum-Platz station

The line's first and only fatal accident occurred close to Robert-Daum-Platz station during maintenance work in the early morning hours of 12 April 1999. Workers had forgotten to remove a metal claw from the track on completion of scheduled night work. The first eastbound train of the day hit the claw at a speed of around 50 km/h (31 mph), derailed, and fell about 10 metres (33 ft) into the river Wupper, killing five passengers and injuring 47, some seriously. The salvage operation took three days and nights to complete. Eight weeks after the incident, the Schwebebahn returned to operation. The cost of the damage was approximately 8 million marks.
The judicial inquiry into the incident highlighted that the disaster was not caused by technical defects or mechanical system failure, but by the negligence of workers who had fallen behind in their schedule during the preceding night, and abandoned the work site hastily ten minutes before the train departed from the depot. Contributing to the accident was a lack of control of their activities by site supervisors.
The works manager in charge of safety, and the workers dealing with the steel claw, were acquitted of all charges by the District Court of Wuppertal. The site supervision personnel, having neglected their duties of control, were sentenced for involuntary manslaughter in five cases and bodily injury caused by negligence in 47 cases, but given probation under verdict 4 StR 289/01, dated 31 January 2002.
Since then, it has become a custom to follow every repair work to the line by a test run at slow speed, even though this is not prescribed by law.

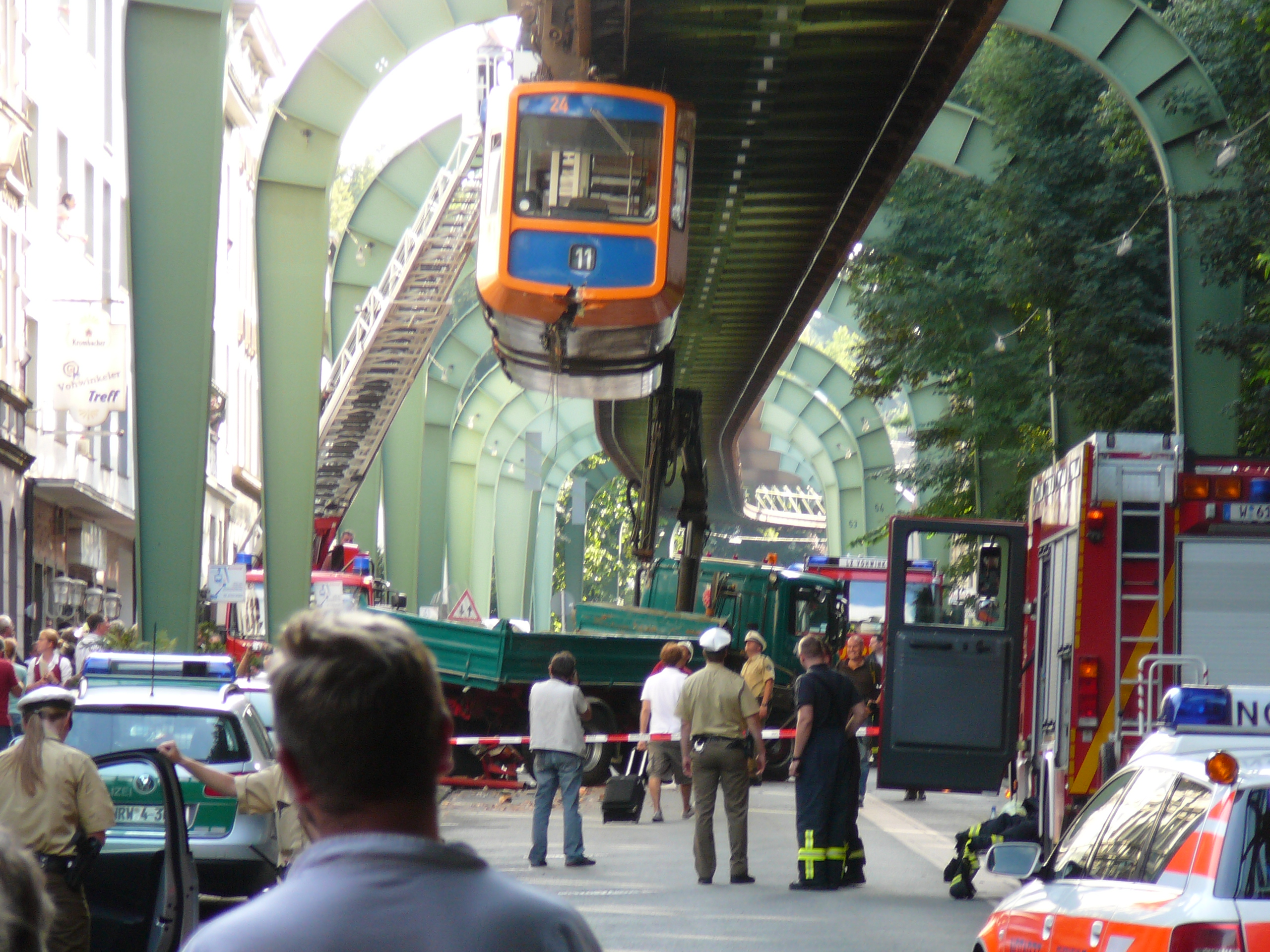
Aftermath of the collision with a crane, near Hammerstein station, 5 August 2008

5 August 2008
A train collided with a crane truck making deliveries under the track, causing a 10-metre-long (33 ft) tear in the floor of one of the cars. The truck driver was seriously injured, and the train driver and some passengers were treated for shock.
17 October 2013
A section of power rail 260 metres (850 ft) long fell from the track onto Bundesstraße 7, damaging several cars parked underneath and forcing closure of the road. The city's fire service had to rescue 76 passengers from a stranded train. No one was injured.
November 2018
A 350 metres (1,150 ft) long section of the power rail fell to the ground, extensively damaging a parked car. After the replacement of 18,000 support clamps, the line reopened in August 2019.

== In popular culture ==
=== Literature ===
The Schwebebahn is alluded to in Theodor Herzl's 1902 utopian novel Altneuland (The Old New Land). For Herzl, the Schwebebahn was the ideal form of urban transport, and he imagined a large monorail built in its style in Haifa.

=== Film ===
A sequence in Peter Delpeut's 1992 collage film Lyrical Nitrate, using film from between 1905 and 1915, features the Schwebebahn. Rüdiger Vogler and Yella Rottländer's characters ride the Schwebebahn in Wim Wenders's 1974 movie Alice in the Cities (Alice in den Städten). It also appears in the 1992 Dutch movie The Sunday Child (De Zondagsjongen) by Pieter Verhoeff, in Tom Tykwer's 2000 film The Princess and the Warrior (Der Krieger und die Kaiserin), and as a background to a number of outdoor dance choreographies in another Wim Wenders film – 2011's Pina, where some dances are also set inside the cars.

The Schwebebahn is both subject and title of video work by the Turner Prize-nominated artist Darren Almond. Produced in 1995, Schwebebahn is the first of three videos that constitute his Train Trilogy.

The Museum of Modern Art has a two-minute film from 1902 featuring the Schwebebahn. A colourized and upscaled version of the 1902 film is now available and has been matched with a recent video.

=== Other fiction ===
Some of the events in Le Feu de Wotan, a Belgian bande dessinée in the Yoko Tsuno series, take place in the Schwebebahn.

The denouement of the episode of the 1972 ITC TV series The Adventurer called "I'll Get There Sometime" takes place on the railway.

=== Video games ===
In 2013 the Schwebebahn Simulator 2013 was launched for Windows, Mac OS X and Wii U. In this simulator, the player controls the GTW 72.

In the "Add-on Wuppertal" DLC of the OMSI 2 bus simulator, there is the option for the player to control the Schwebebahn of the newest model (GTW 15), with all stations faithfully recreated.

== Gallery ==
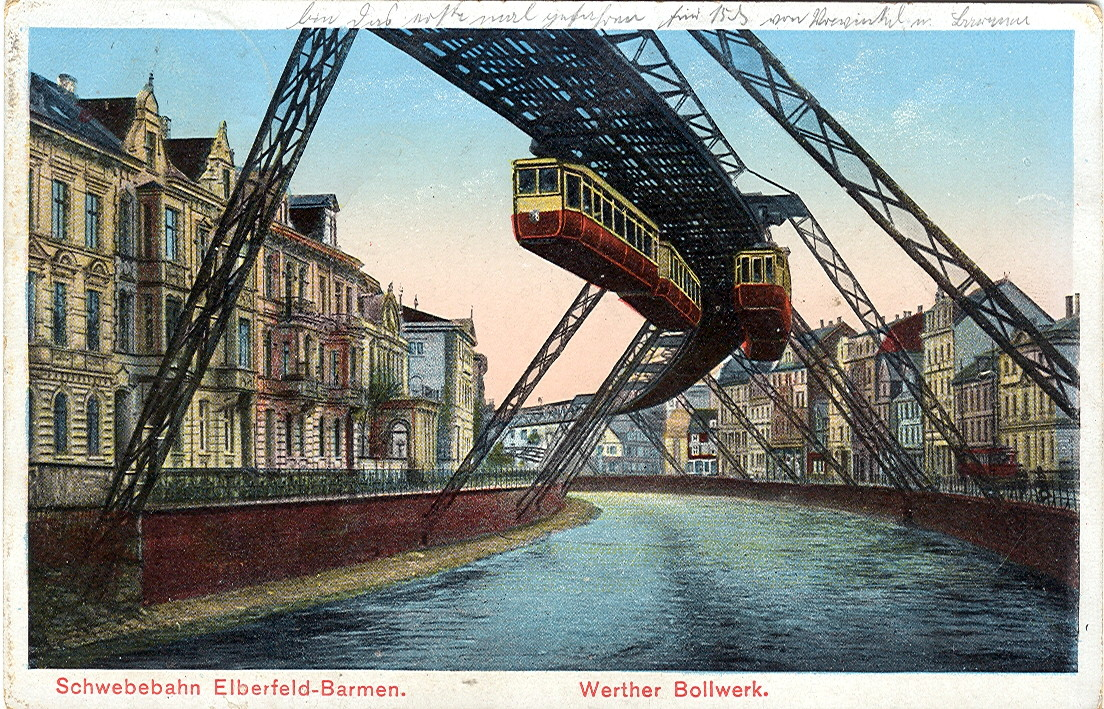
1913 depiction of the line

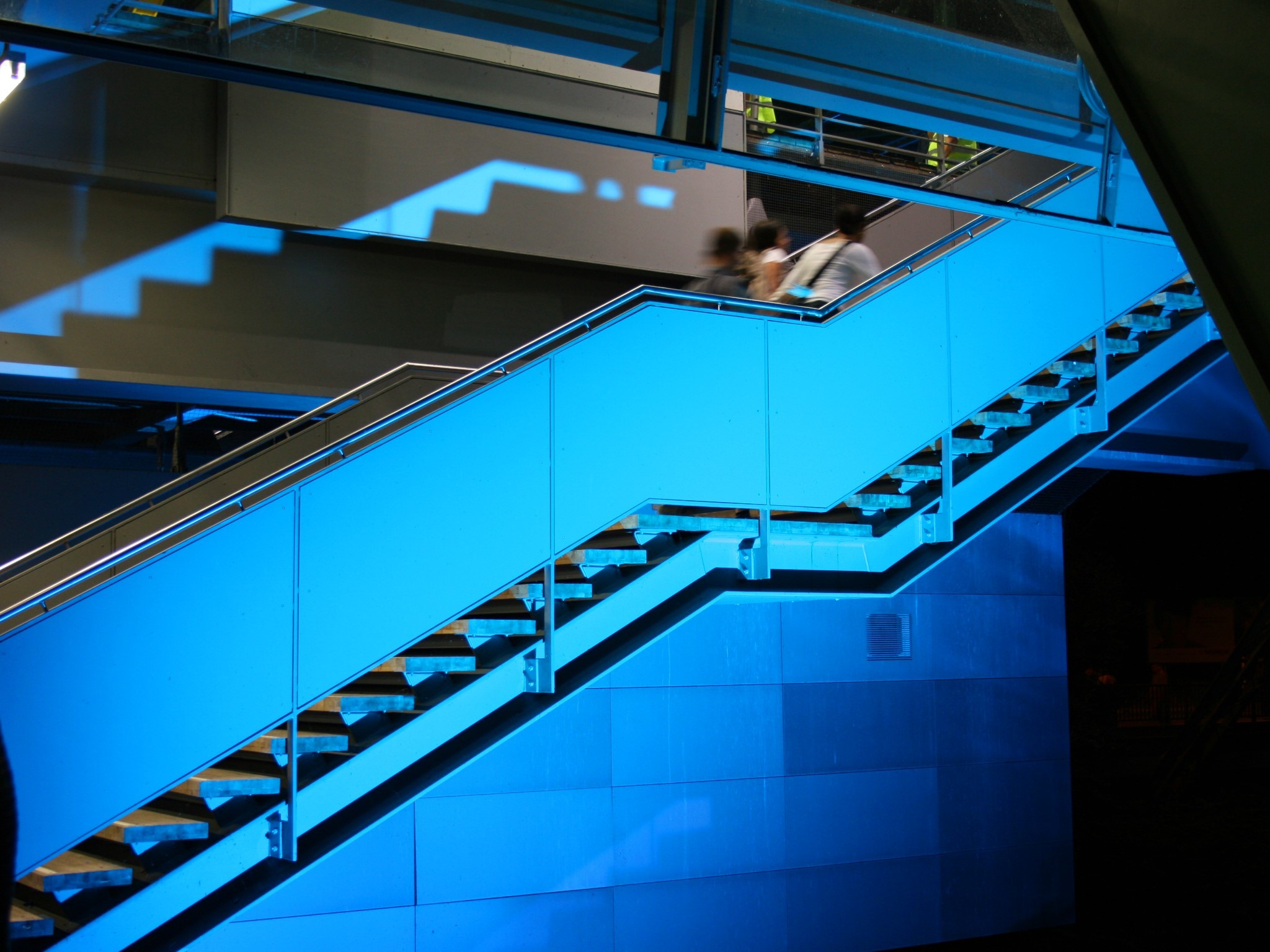
Zoo station at night

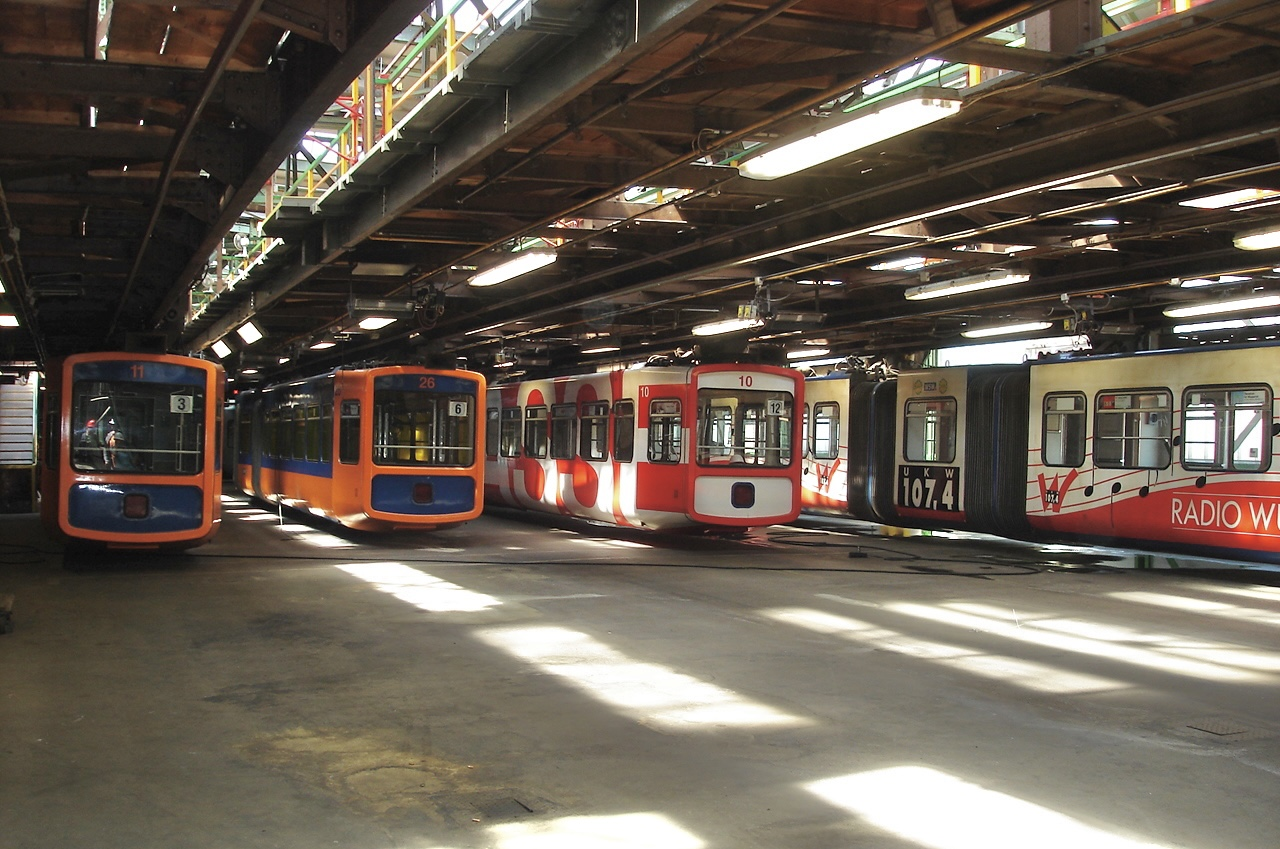
Wuppertaler Schwebebahn depot

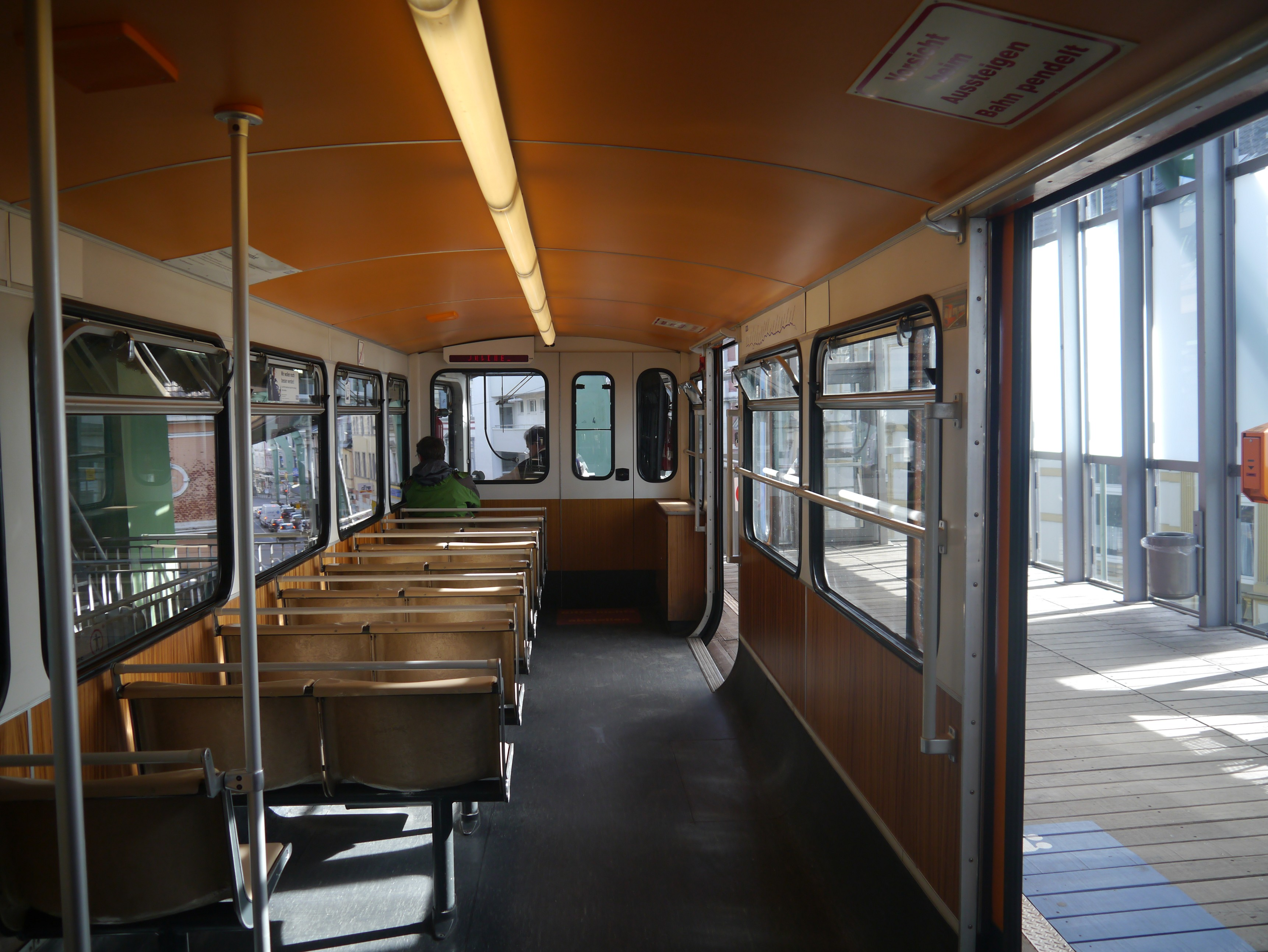
GTW 72 train interior

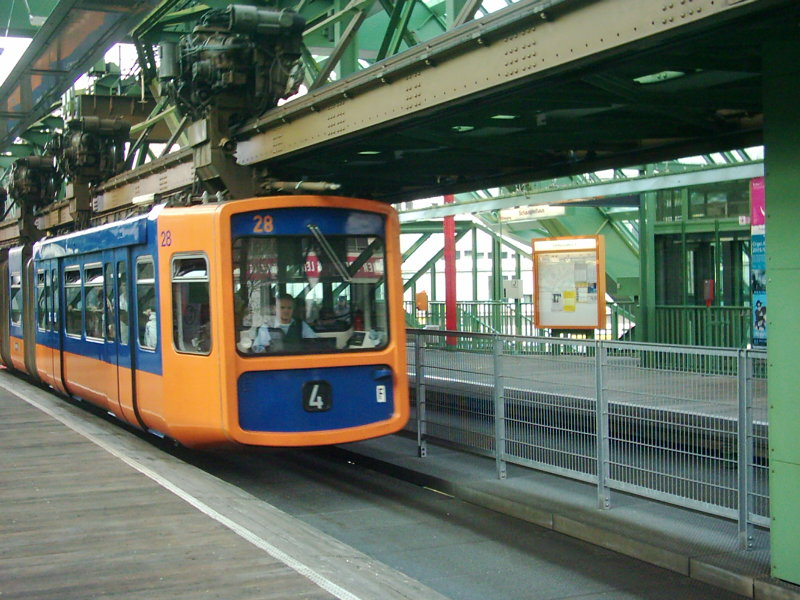
GTW 72 train at a station

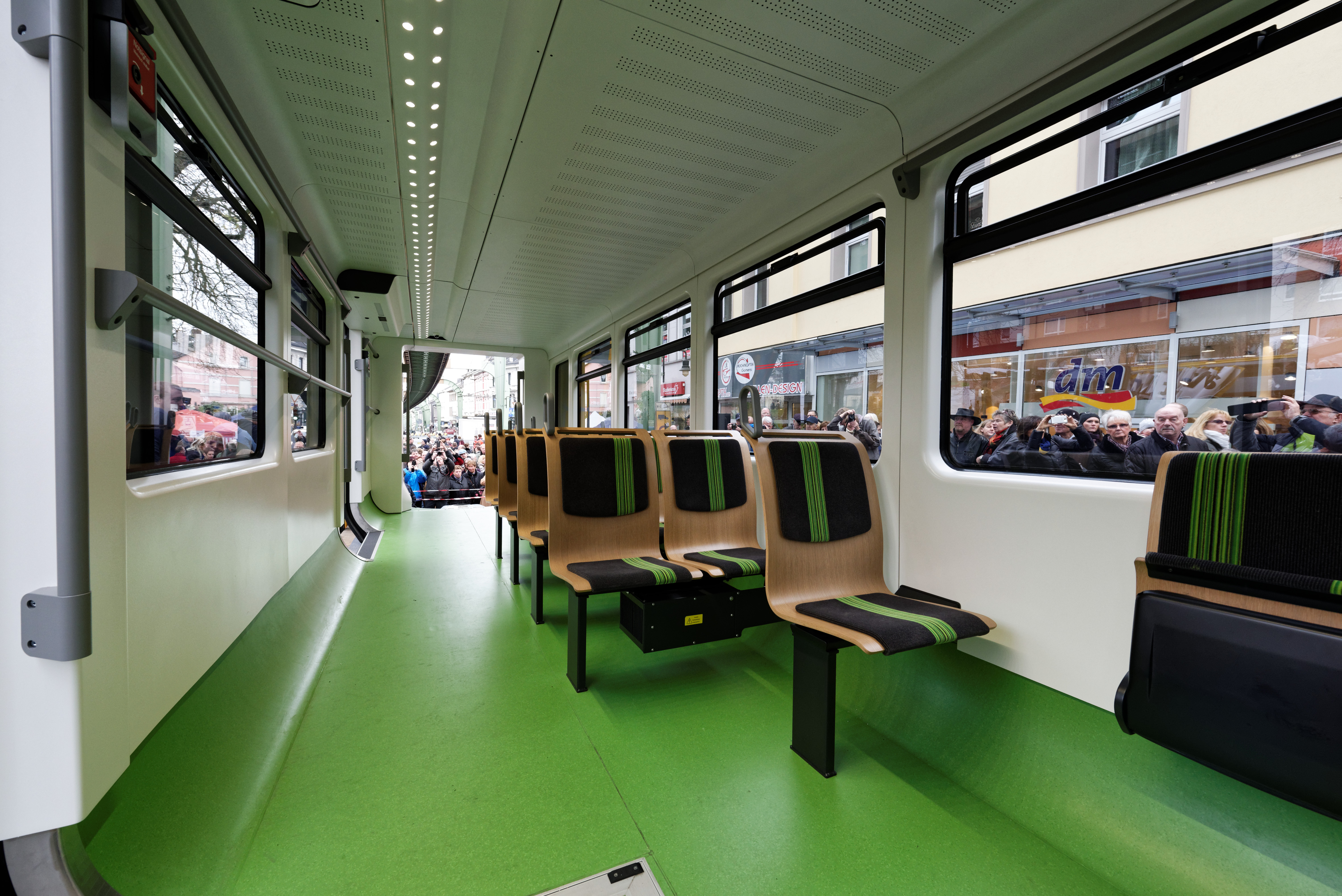
Generation 15 train interior

Timelapse video

== See also ==
- Aerobus
- Bennie Railplane
- Dresden Suspension Railway
- Elevated railway
- H-Bahn (Dortmund and Düsseldorf)
- Lists of rapid transit systems
- Memphis Suspension Railway
- Monorail
- Shonan Monorail (Japan)
- Chiba Urban Monorail (Japan)
- Skybus Metro (India)
- Suspension railway
