= Kaiserwagen =

Carriage car

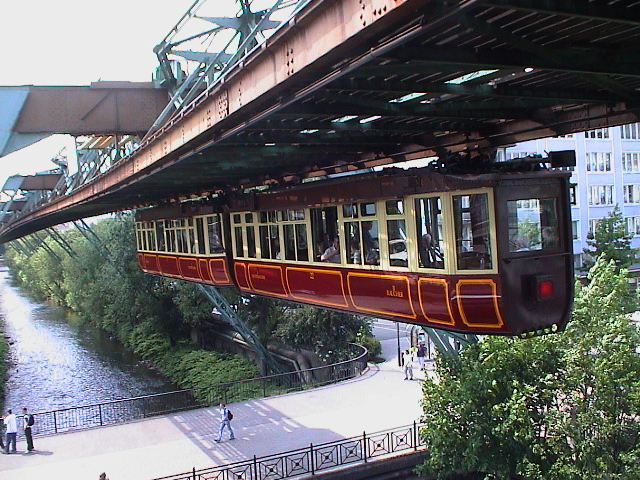
Historical Kaiserwagen

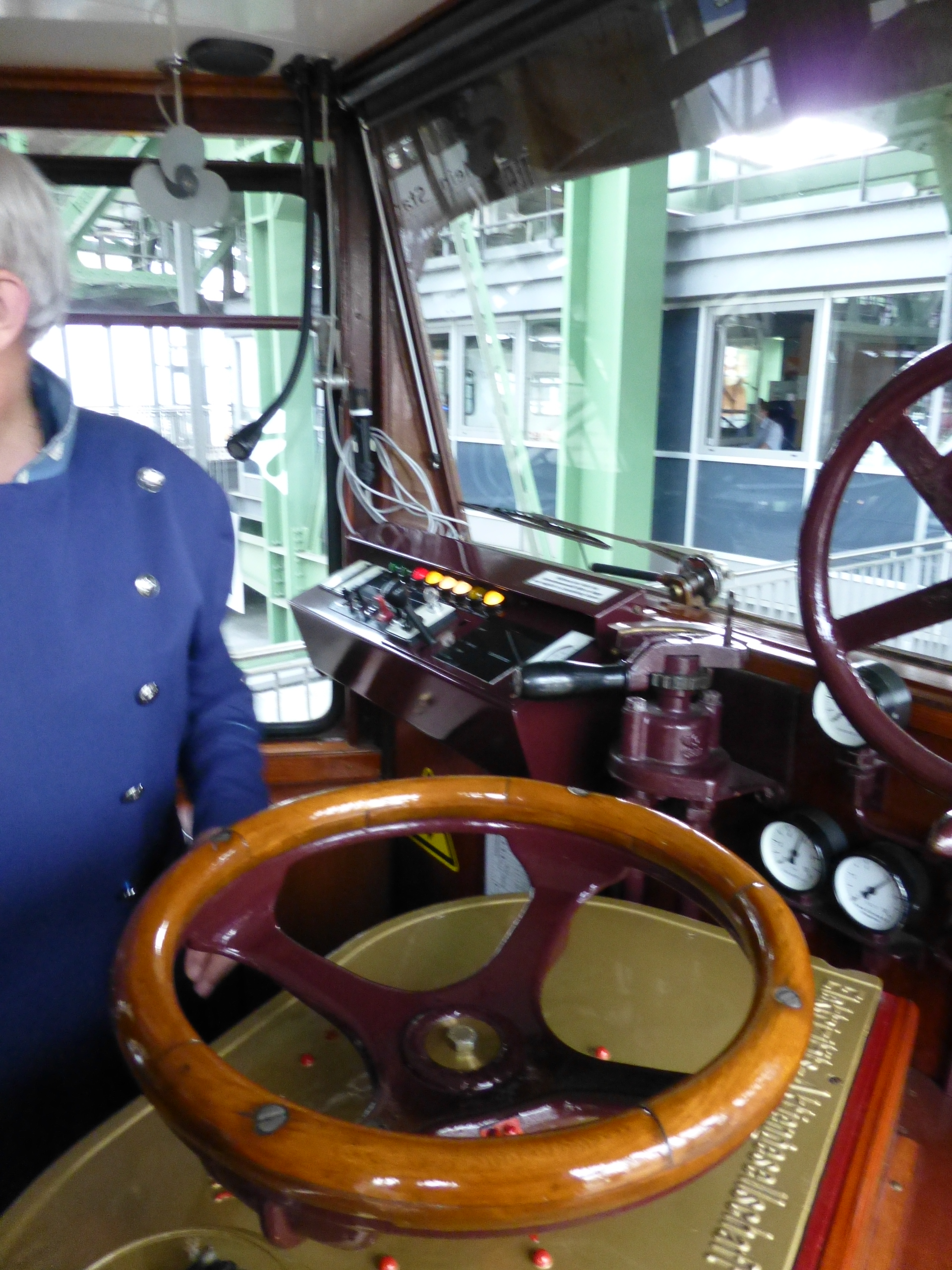
Driver's Cab

The Kaiserwagen (Emperor's car) is a carriage car built for the Wuppertal Schwebebahn (suspension railway) in 1900. A replica of the original carriage still periodically operates.

German Emperor Wilhelm II and his consort Augusta Victoria of Schleswig-Holstein rode in the original carriage when they visited Wuppertal on 24 October 1900. Both the carriage, and the overall suspension-railway system, have been designated protected monuments since 26 May 1997.

== Availability ==
A replica of the Kaiserwagen is currently available for private charters such as weddings, meetings, and ceremonies, in addition to being used for tourists and in publicity by the railway operators.
