= Vohwinkel Schwebebahn =

Monorail terminal in Wuppertal, Germany

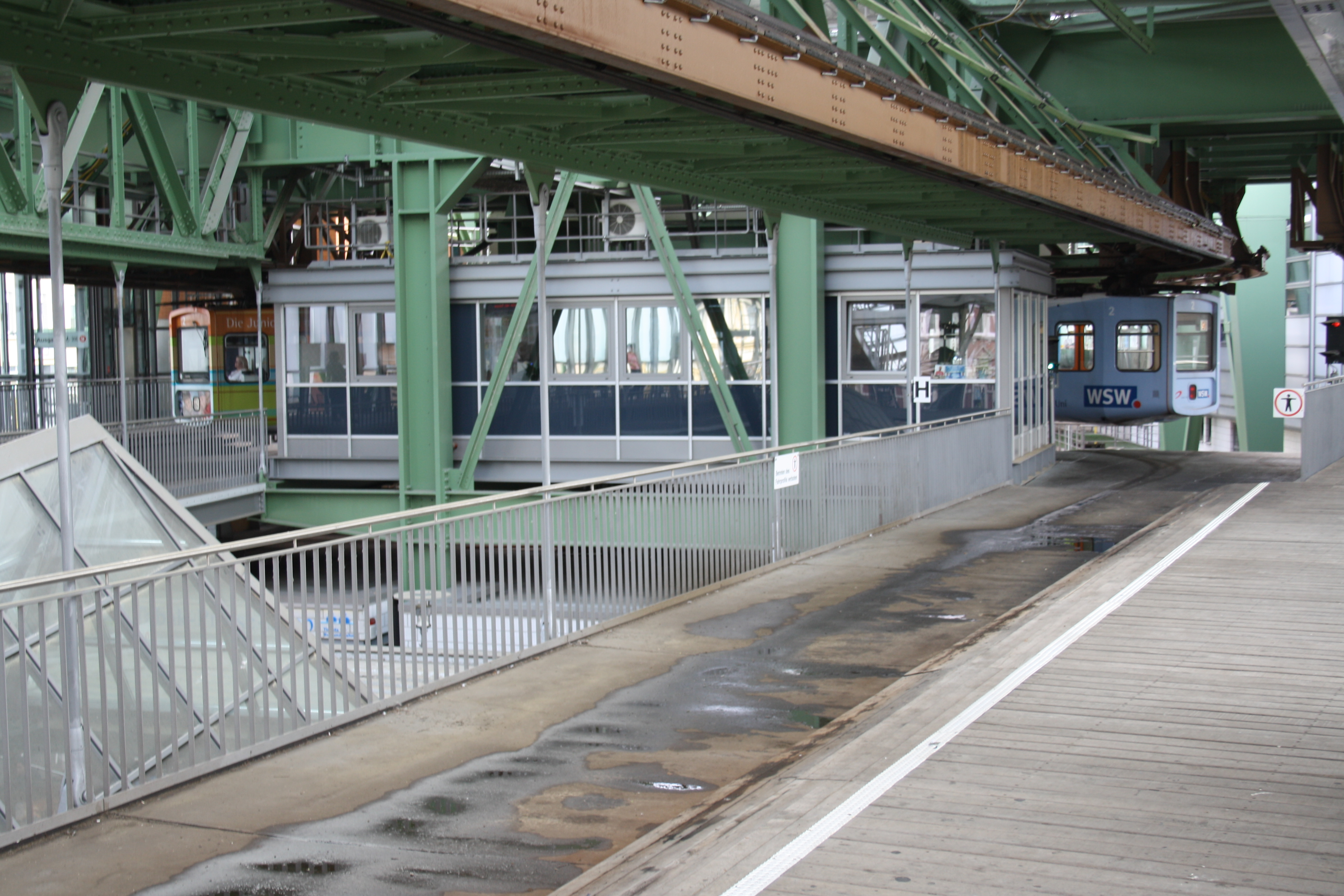
- A train in the turning loop

General information
- Location: 19 Vohwinkeler Str., Vohwinkel; Wuppertal, North Rhine-Westphalia; Germany
- Coordinates: 51.2304°N 7.0678°E
- Elevation: Suspended
- Operator: WSW mobil
- Line: Wuppertal Schwebebahn
- Distance: 0.9m/1.5km
- Platforms: 2 (side)
- Tracks: 2 Suspended Monorail
- Bus routes: 600, 609, 621, 631, 641, 745, 784, E818, E826, E839, E870, E874, E879, E902
- Bus stands: 9
- Bus operators: Rheinbahn; Rheinlandbus; Stadtwerke Solingen; Wuppertaler Stadtwerke
- Connections: Vohwinkel Deutsche Bahn

Construction
- Structure type: Elevated above pedestrian zone
- Parking: Yes
- Architect: Eugen Langen

Other information
- Fare zone: VRR: 656; VRS: 1650 (VRR transitional tariff)

History
- Opened: 24 May 1901

Services
Preceding station	WSW mobil	Following station
Terminus	Wuppertal Schwebebahn	Bruch towards Oberbarmen
Location

Vohwinkel Schwebebahn station is the western terminal of the Wuppertal Schwebebahn. It contains the station, a loop for the train to turn around, the depot with a second loop, and the three-storied main works for maintenance and repair.

Vohwinkel Schwebebahn is km zero of the 13.3 km long track to the eastern terminal, Oberbarmen.

During the renovations that took place between 1999 and 2014, the old passenger station was torn down in 2007 and replaced.

== Transportation hub ==
The railway station, Wuppertal-Vohwinkel, that had been initially adjacent was in 1908 moved about 300 m east and is accessible by foot. Public transportation by bus provides connections to Solingen, Mettman, Haan, Hilden, and Düsseldorf, among others. The Solingen connection is by trolleybus.
