= Oberbarmen station =

Monorail terminal in Wuppertal, Germany

Coordinates: 51°16′29″N 7°13′20″E

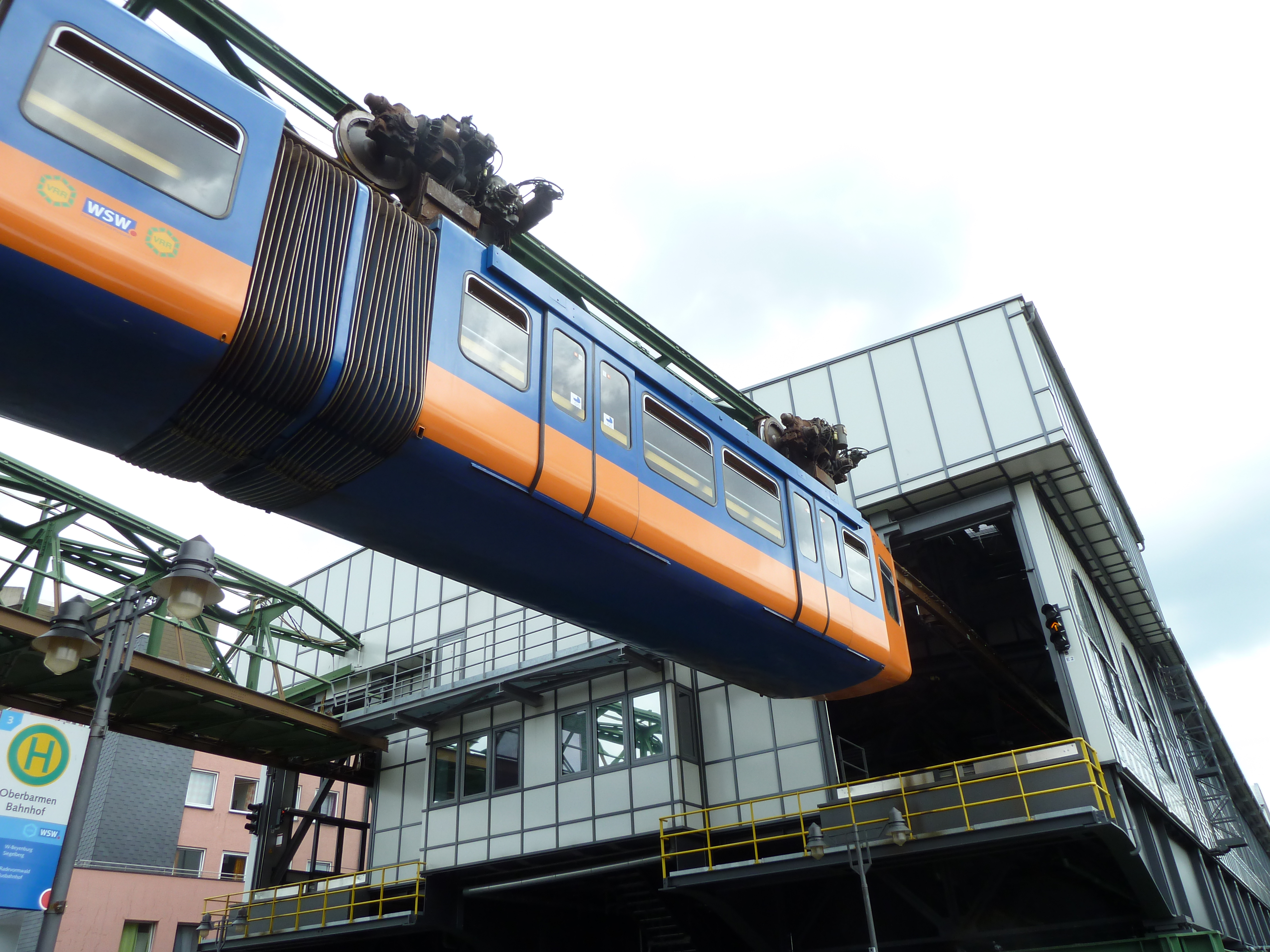
Train entering turning loop in depot building

Oberbarmen is the eastern terminal of the Wuppertal Schwebebahn; it is located in the Barmen area of Wuppertal. The terminal consists of two buildings, the station proper and the depot with the loop for the train to turn around. The depot holds trains during the night. The buildings are suspended above the Wupper and separated by a bridge, the Wupperbrücke Berliner Platz. The main works for maintenance and repair are at the Vohwinkel Schwebebahn terminal.

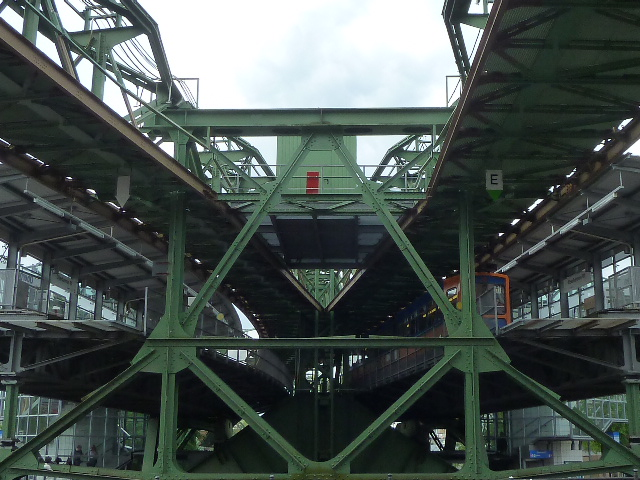
Oberbarmen passenger station. Track divides for turning loop

The Oberbarmen station is at kilometer 13.3 of the Schwebebahn track.

Next to the Schwebebahn station is the Wuppertal-Oberbarmen station of the railway, along with bus links to surrounding areas.
