= Eugen Langen =

German entrepreneur, engineer and inventor

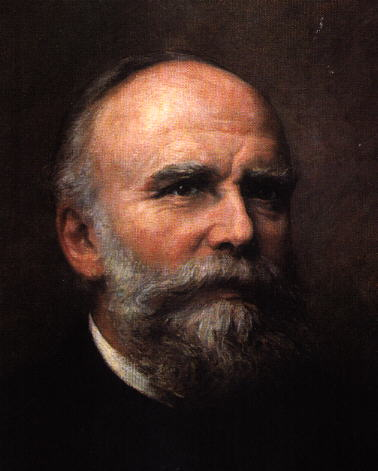
Eugen Langen

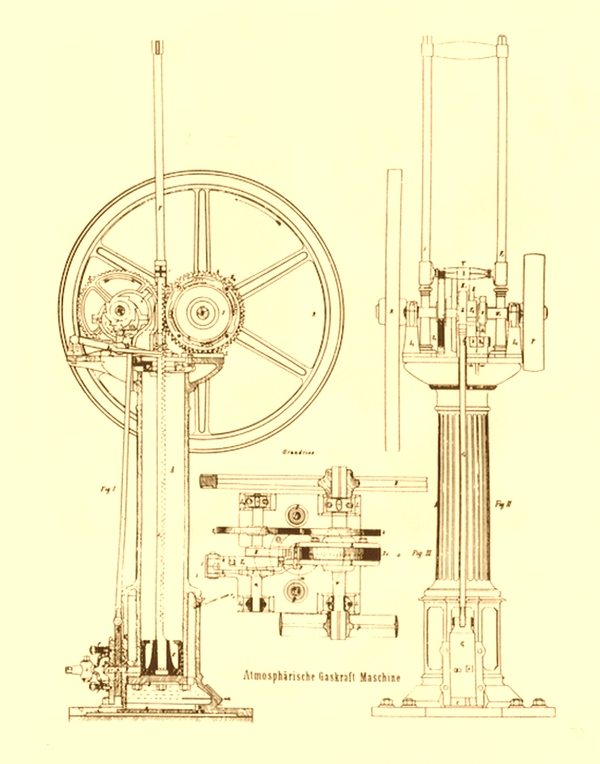
Otto-Langen gas engine 1867.

Carl Eugen Langen (9 October 1833 in Cologne – 2 October 1895 in Elsdorf) was a German entrepreneur, engineer and inventor, involved in the development of the petrol engine and the Wuppertal Suspension Railway. In 1857 he worked in his father's sugar factory, JJ Langen & Söhne, and after extensive technical training at the Polytechnic institute in Karlsruhe, patented a method for producing sugar cubes. In 1870 he co-founded Pfeifer & Langen, still in operation today. He sold this method in 1872 to Sir Henry Tate of England, founder of the Tate Gallery in London.

== Otto and Langen ==
In 1864, Langen met Nicolaus August Otto who was working to improve the gas engine invented by Belgian Etienne Lenoir. The technically–trained Langen recognized the potential of Otto's development, and one month after the meeting, founded the first engine factory in the world, NA Otto & Cie. At the 1867 Paris World Exhibition, their improved engine received the Grand Prize.

== Deutz ==
After this first factory went bankrupt, Langen founded a new company for the construction of gas engines, Gasmotoren-Fabrik Deutz, which later became the group Kloeckner-Humboldt-Deutz (KHD). This became the current Deutz AG. Langen invented and applied new methods of production in the KHD factory.

== Railway equipment ==
In the field of rail transport equipment, Langen was co-owner and engineer of the Cologne Waggonfabrik van der Zypen & Charlier. He started the suspension railway system in Wuppertal in 1894.

== See also ==
- German inventors and discoverers
