= Elevated railway =

Rapid transit railway with the tracks above street level

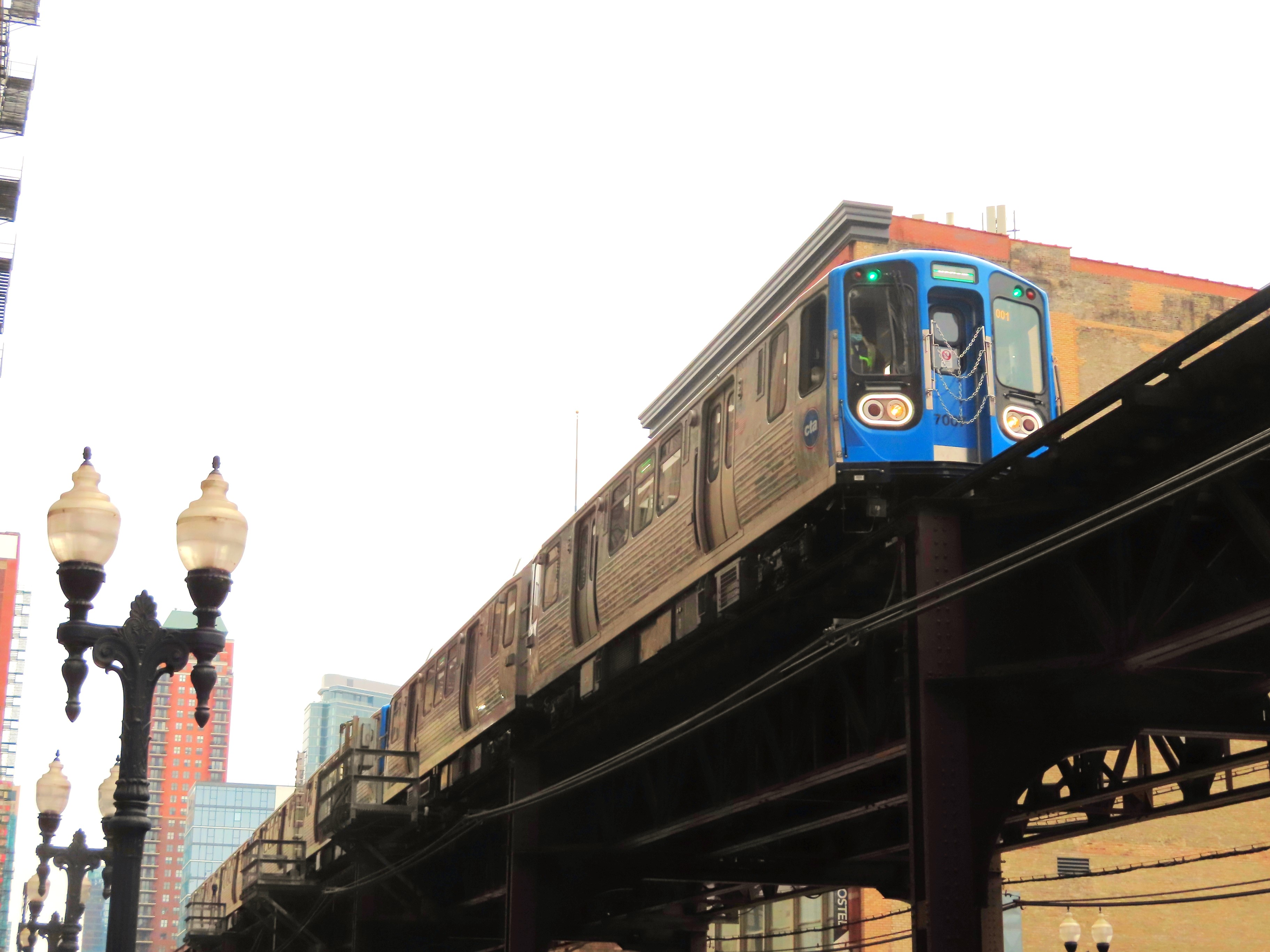
A Chicago "L" train

An elevated railway or elevated train (also known as an el train or el for short, and sometimes also spelled as L train) is a railway with the tracks above street level on a viaduct or other elevated structure (usually constructed from steel, cast iron, concrete, or bricks). The railway may be a broad-gauge, standard-gauge or narrow-gauge railway, rapid transit, light rail, monorail, or a suspension railway. Elevated railways are normally found in urban areas that would otherwise require impracticably many level crossings. Usually, the tracks of elevated railways that run on steel viaducts can be seen from street level.

== History ==
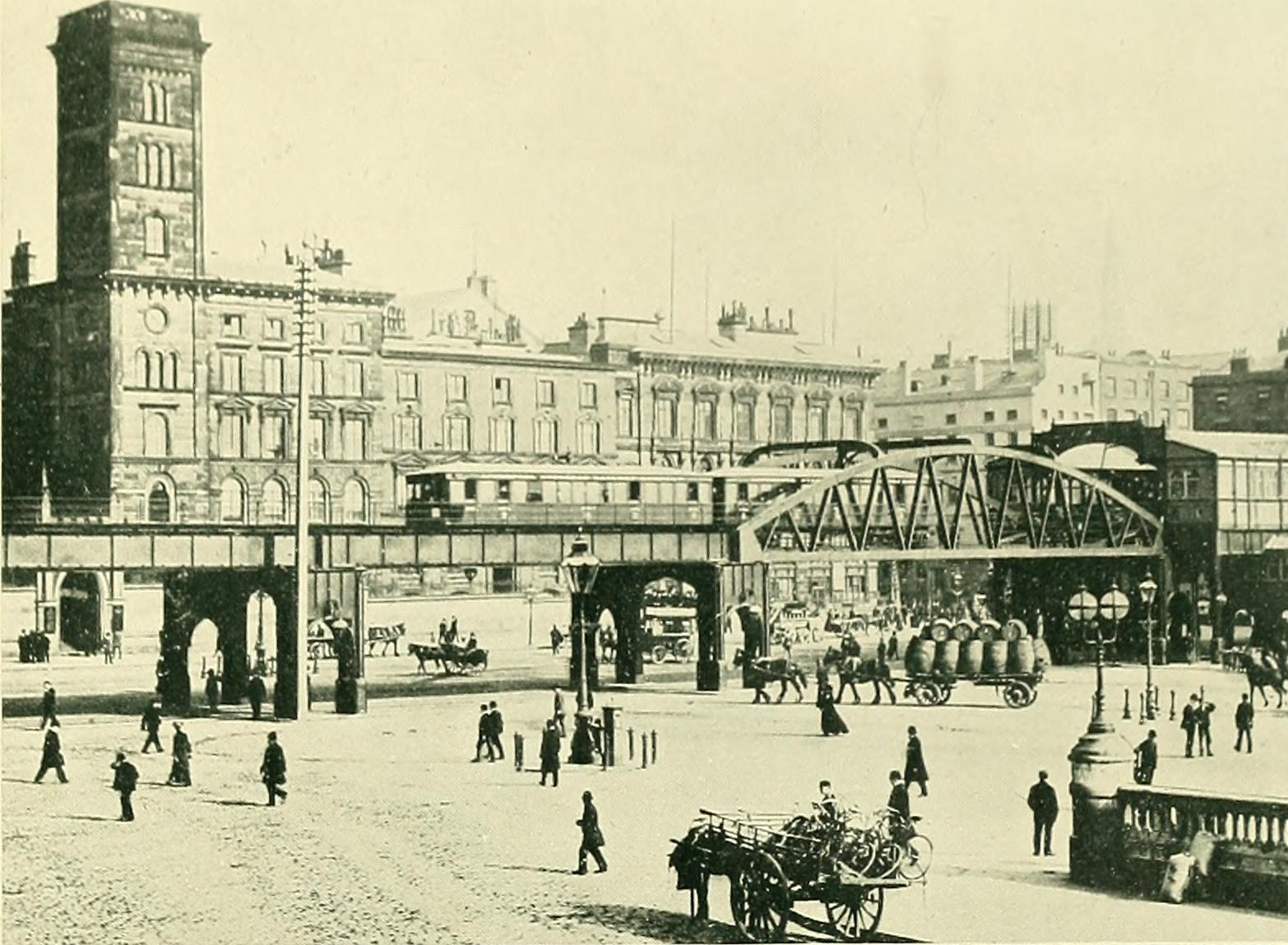
Liverpool Overhead Railway, 1911

The earliest elevated railway was the London and Greenwich Railway on a brick viaduct of 878 arches, built between 1836 and 1838. The first 2.5 miles (4.0 km) of the London and Blackwall Railway (1840) was also built on a viaduct. During the 1840s there were other plans for elevated railways in London that never came to fruition.

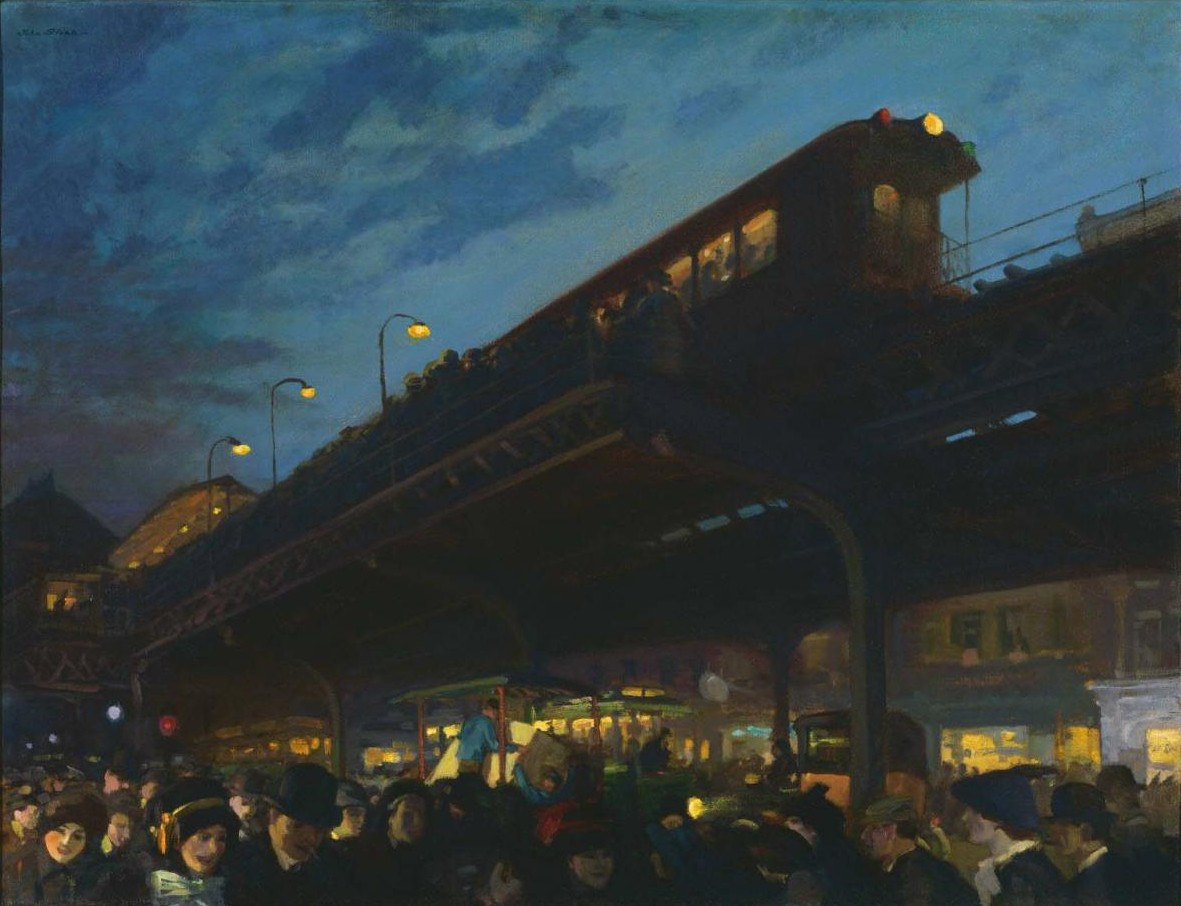
Six O'Clock, Winter, by John Sloan, depicting Chicago's L Train. Painted 1912.

From the late 1860s onward, elevated railways became popular in US cities. New York's West Side and Yonkers Patent Railway opened in 1868 as a cable-hauled elevated railway and was operated using locomotives after 1871, when it was renamed the New York Elevated Railroad. This was followed in 1875 by the Manhattan Railway Company, which took over the New York Elevated Railroad. Other early elevated systems in the US included the Chicago "L", which was built by multiple competing companies beginning in 1892, as well as the Boston Elevated Railway in 1901 and the Market–Frankford Line in Philadelphia in 1907. Globally, the Berlin Stadtbahn (1882) and the Vienna Stadtbahn (1898) are also mainly elevated.

The first electric elevated railway was the Liverpool Overhead Railway, which operated through Liverpool docks from 1893 until 1956.

In London, the Docklands Light Railway is a modern elevated railway that opened in 1987 and has since expanded. The trains are driverless and automatic. Another modern elevated railway is Tokyo's driverless Yurikamome line, opened in 1995.

== Systems ==
=== Monorail systems ===
Most monorails are elevated railways, such as the Disneyland Monorail System (1959), the Tokyo Monorail (1964), the Sydney Monorail (1988–2013), the KL Monorail, the Las Vegas Monorail, the Seattle Center Monorail and the São Paulo Monorail. Most maglev railways are also elevated.

Two Wuppertal Schwebebahn trains

=== Suspension railways ===
During the 1890s there was some interest in suspension railways, particularly in Germany, with the Schwebebahn Dresden, (1891–) and the Wuppertal Schwebebahn (1901). H-Bahn suspension railways were built in Dortmund and Düsseldorf airport, 1975. The Memphis Suspension Railway opened in 1982.

Suspension railways are usually monorail; Shonan Monorail and Chiba Urban Monorail in Japan, despite their names, are suspension railways.

=== People mover systems ===
People mover or automated people mover (APM) is a type of driverless grade-separated, mass-transit system. The term is generally used only to describe systems that serve as loops or feeder systems, but is sometimes applied to considerably more complex automated systems. Similar to monorails, Bombardier Innovia APM technology uses only one rail to guide the vehicle along the guideway. APMs are common at airports and effective at helping passengers quickly reach their gates. Several elevated APM systems at airports including the PHX Sky Train at Phoenix Sky Harbor International Airport; AeroTrain at Kuala Lumpur International Airport; and the Tracked Shuttle System at London Gatwick Airport, United Kingdom.

== Modern systems ==
=== Rapid transit, light rail or commuter rail systems ===
==== Africa ====
- Addis Ababa Light Rail
- Cairo Metro (Line 3)
- Lagos Metro

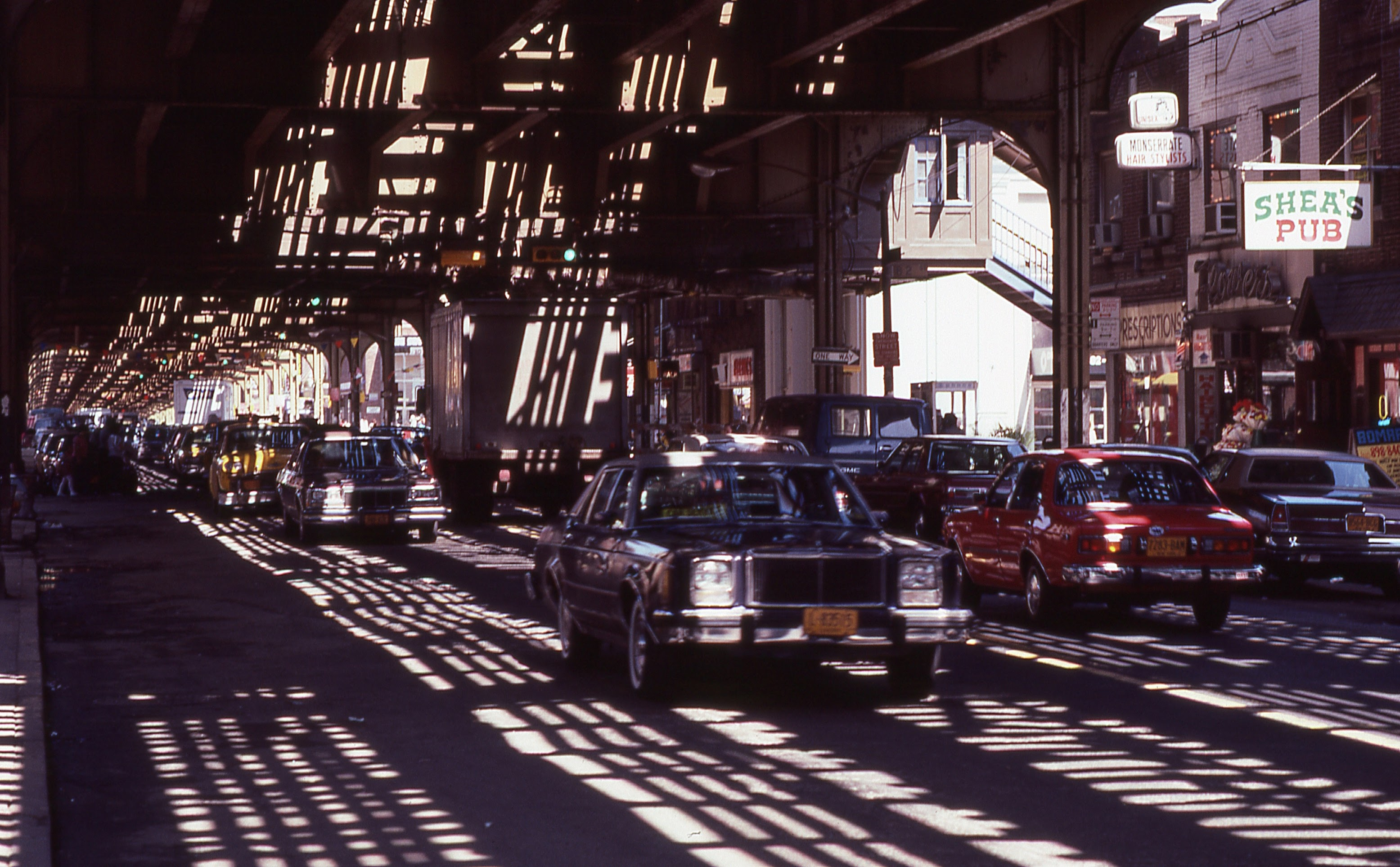
Roosevelt Avenue in New York City, under the IRT Flushing Line (used by the 7 and <7> trains) in the 1980s

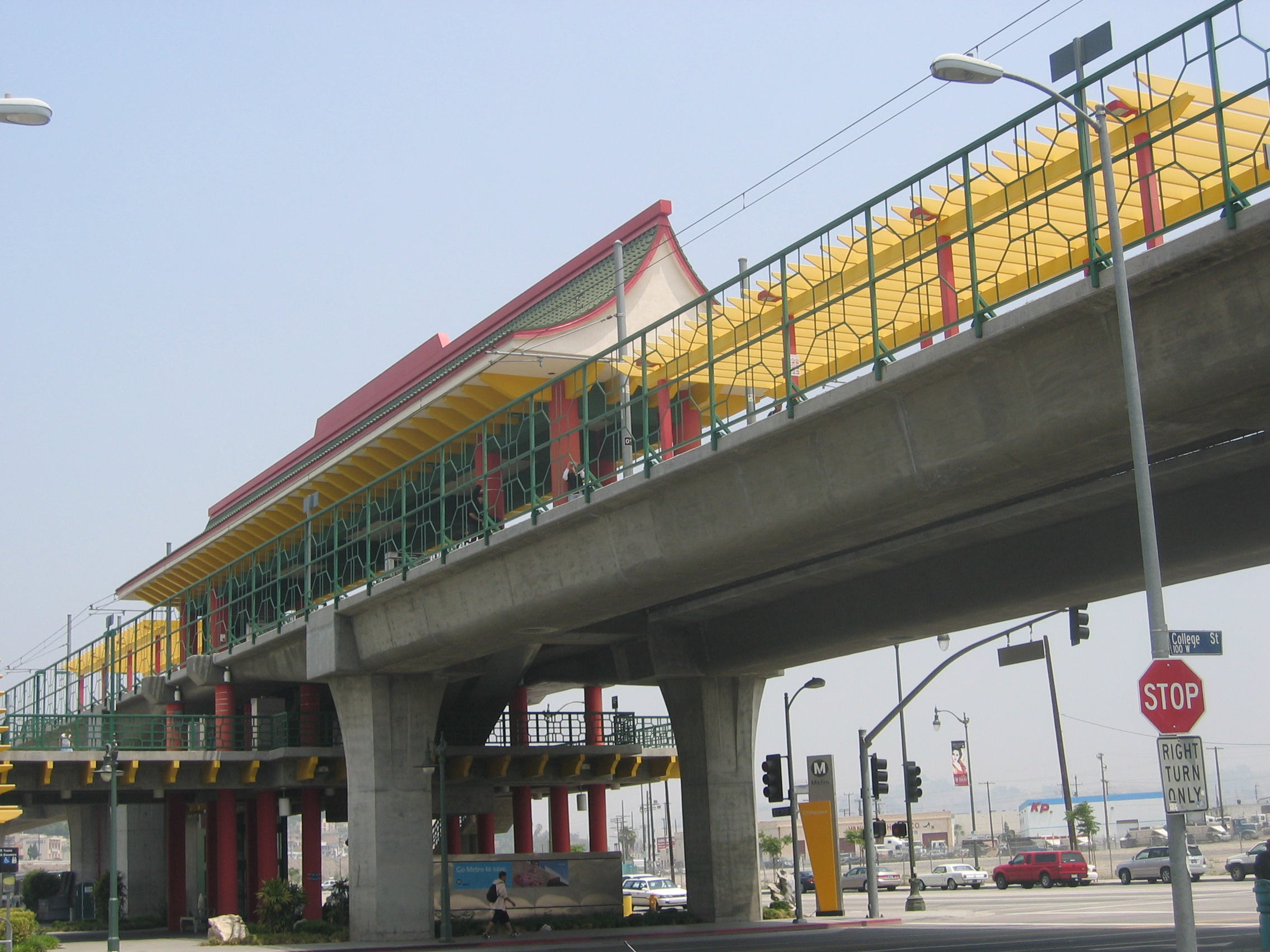
Chinatown station in Los Angeles

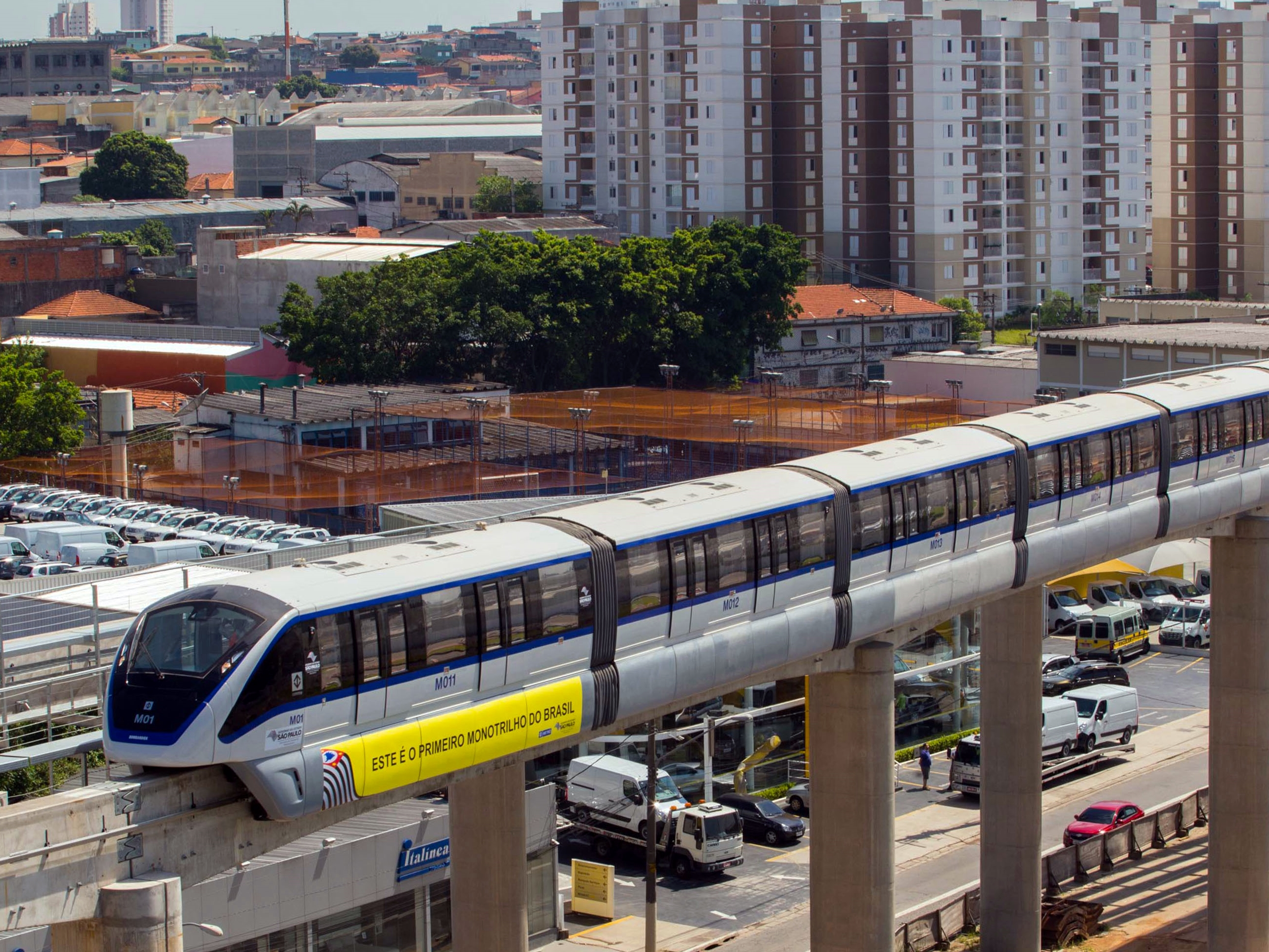
Line 15 monorail, São Paulo

==== Americas ====
- Baltimore Metro (west of Mondawmin)
- Barrie line (Davenport Diamond grade separated crossing)
- BART (partial)
- Chicago "L" (except for underground sections of the Red Line and Blue Line and at-grade sections of the Brown Line, Purple Line, Pink Line, and Yellow Line)
- Cleveland Red Line (partial)
- Dallas Green Line (north branch)
- Boston Green Line (partial)
- Guadalajara light rail system Line 3 (partial)
- Lima Metro (partial)
- Market–Frankford Line (underground in Center City Philadelphia and West Philadelphia up to 40th Street Station but elevated elsewhere)
- Medellín Metro
- MARTA (partial)
- Montreal REM (partial, not fully)
- Metrorrey (partial)
- Mexico City Metro (partial)
- Miami Metrorail
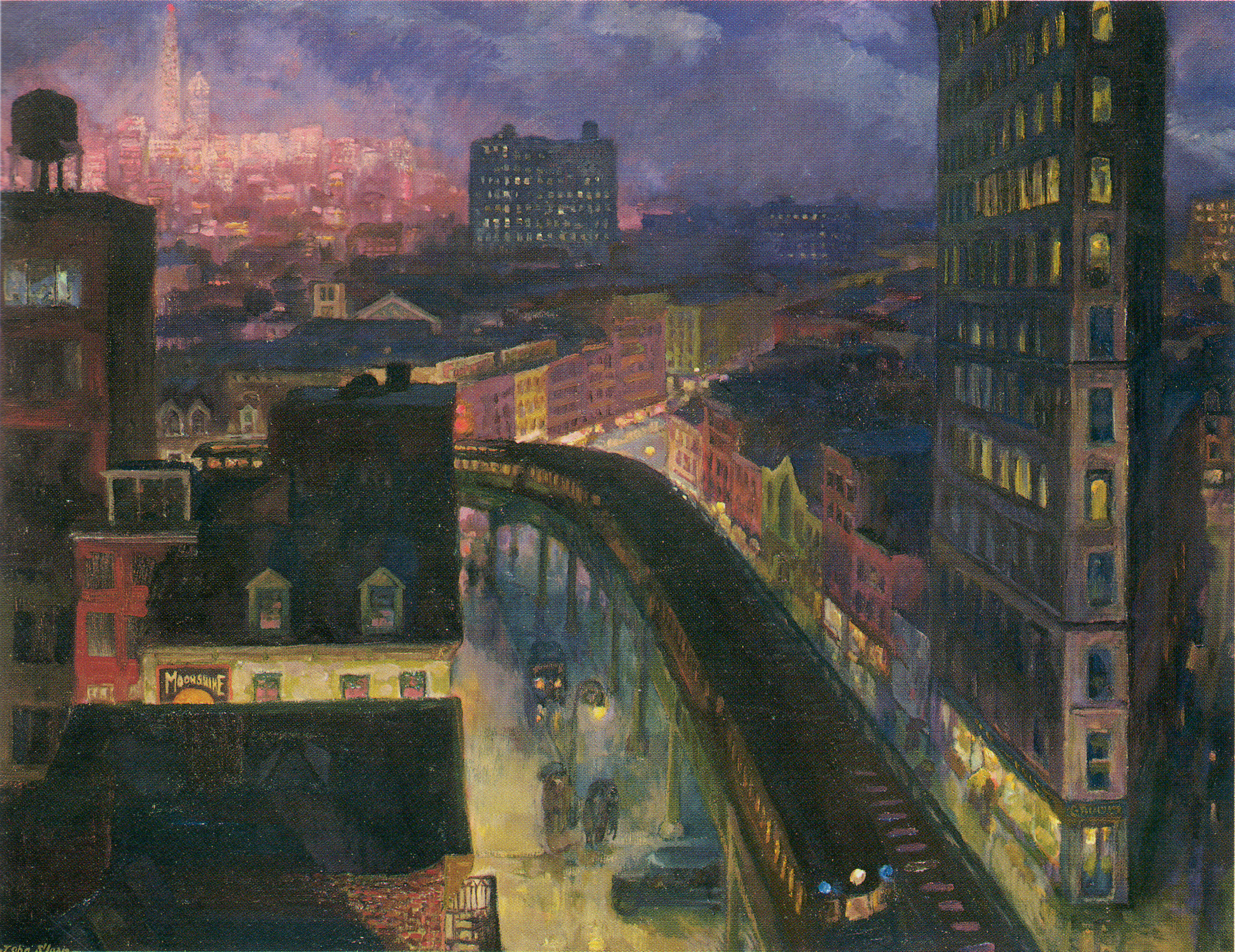
- New York City Subway as seen from Greenwich Village, painting by John Sloan in 1922
  New York City Subway (partial, 40% of tracks)
- Panama City Metro
- PATCO (partial)
- PATH (partial)
- San Diego Trolley (partial)
- Santiago Metro (partial)
- Skyline, Honolulu
- SkyTrain, Vancouver, British Columbia, Canada (partial)
- Tren Urbano
- TTC, Toronto, Ontario, Canada (partial)
  - Line 1 elevated from roughly south of Ranee Avenue, at Yorkdale station, over Highway 401, over Wilson Avenue, and finally for Wilson Station.
  - Line 2 elevated over Mimico Creek, partially elevated for Old Mill station, elevated over Humber River, partially elevated between High Park station, and Runnymede station, Keele station, covered tunnel over Rosedale Ravine between Castle Frank station and Sherbourne station, elevated over Don River Valley in the lower deck of the Prince Edward Viaduct between Castle Frank Station and Broadview station, Victoria Park Station and Warden station are elevated as well.
  - Line 4 elevated over the Don River in a covered tunnel
  - Line 5 elevated guideway over Black Creek and Black Creek Drive, and bridges over Don River West and Don River East in median of Eglinton Avenue for the Eglinton Crosstown section. Guideway over Humber River including both Scarlet Station and Jane Stations.
  - Ontario Line (future) guideway north of the Danforth neighbourhood, over the Don River Valley until Don Valley station, and elevated section through Leslieville alongside quad-tracked GO Train corridor.
- Washington Metro (partial)
- UP Express (partial), an airport express train connecting Lester B. Pearson International Airport to Toronto Union Station in Toronto, Ontario

==== Asia ====
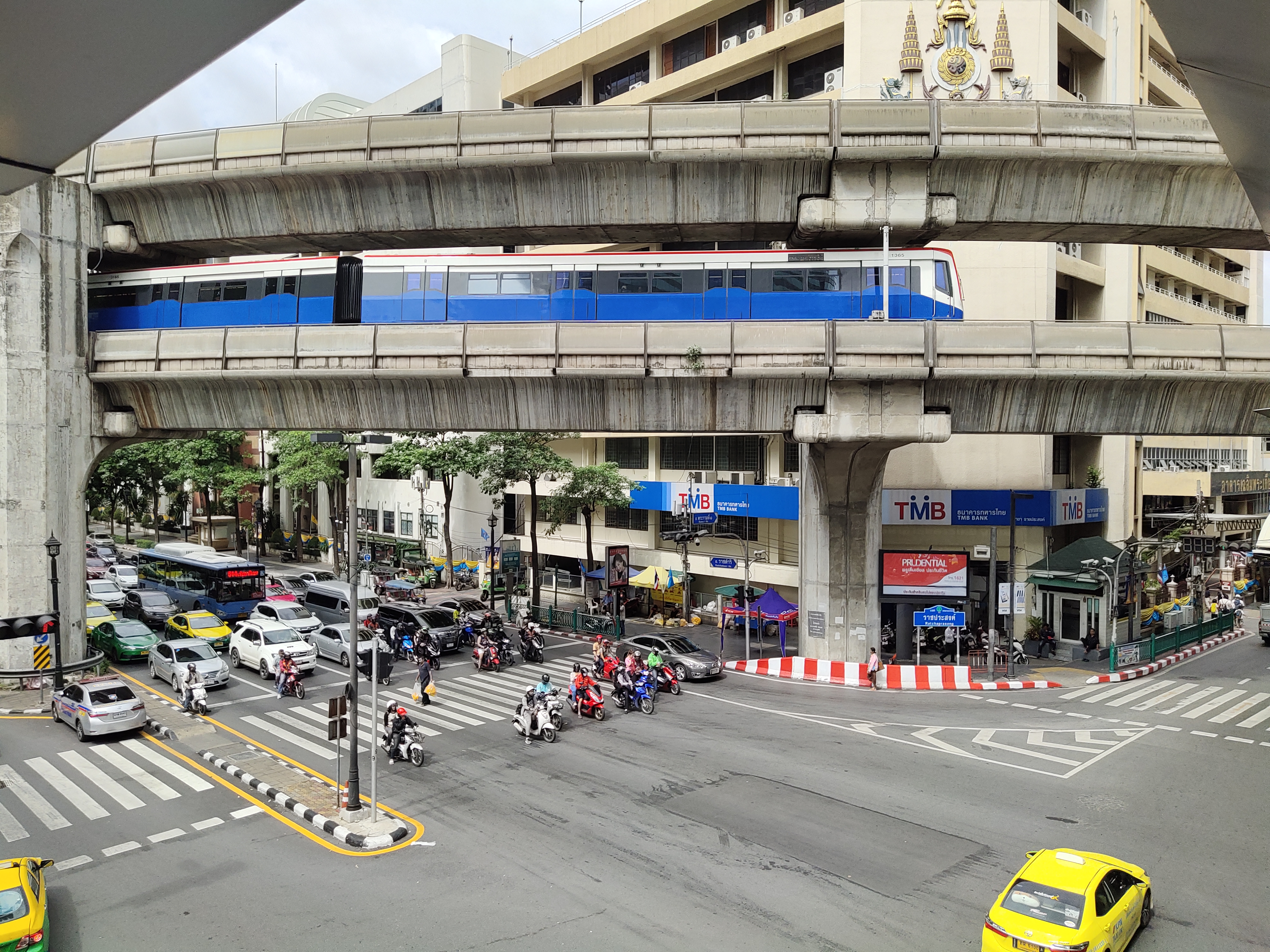
Skytrain in Bangkok

- Bishan SkyShuttle
- BTS Skytrain, two elevated rapid transit lines in Bangkok
- Bangkok MRT, all lines except part of the Blue line
- Chennai Metro
- Chennai Mass Rapid Transit System
- Chongqing Rail Transit (Line 3)
- Daegu Metro (Line 3)
- Danhai light rail
- Delhi Metro (Yellow Line, Green Line, Red Line)
- Dhaka Metro Rail
- Dubai Metro
- Hanoi Metro, Vietnam
- Ho Chi Minh City Metro, Vietnam (partial)
- Hong Kong MTR (Kwun Tong line, Tsuen Wan line, Island line, Tuen Ma line, East Rail line, South Island line, Tung Chung line and Airport Express) (all partial)
- Hyderabad Metro
- Jabodebek LRT
- Jakarta LRT
- Jakarta MRT (North-South Line, partial)

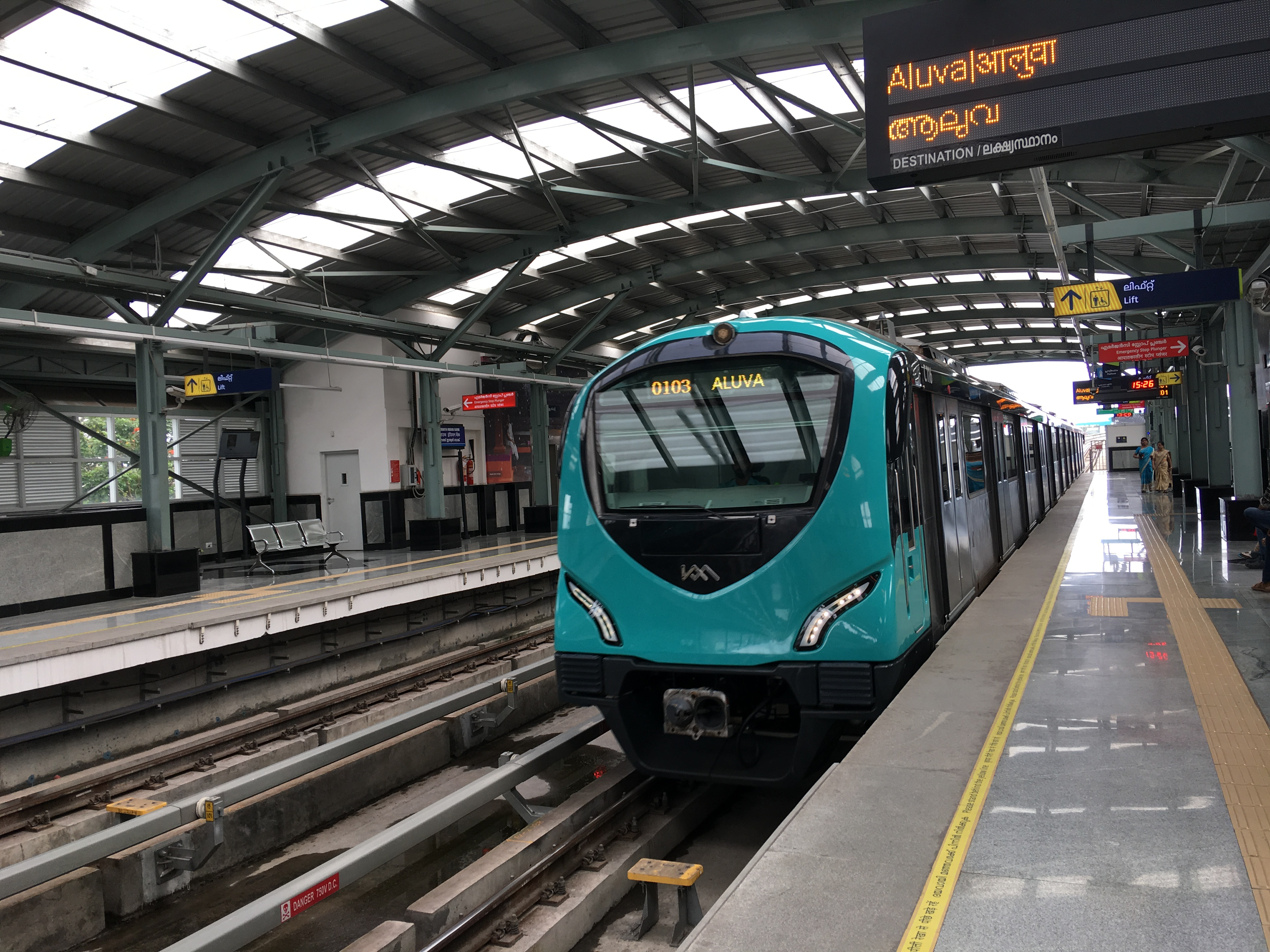
Kochi Metro train at Aluva station

- Kochi Metro
- Kolkata Metro (future line 5 and 6, later is under construction)
- KRL Commuterline (Bogor Line, partial)
- Lahore Metro (Orange Line)
- Manila Light Rail Transit System
- Navi Mumbai Metro
- Mumbai Metro
- Mumbai Monorail
- Nagpur Metro
- Namma Metro
- Rapid Metro Gurgaon
- Rapid Rail, the operator of the rapid transit (metro) system serving Kuala Lumpur and the Klang Valley area in Malaysia.
- Singapore MRT (North–South Line and East–West Line) (all partial)
- Singapore LRT (automated people mover (APM))
- New Taipei Metro (Circular line, north branch of Tamsui–Xinyi line, and Wenhu line)
- Doha Metro (all partial except Gold Line which is fully underground.)
- Riyadh Metro (except Green Line which is fully underground.)
- Line 1 (Pingshan SkyShuttle)

==== Europe ====
S-Bahn in Berlin

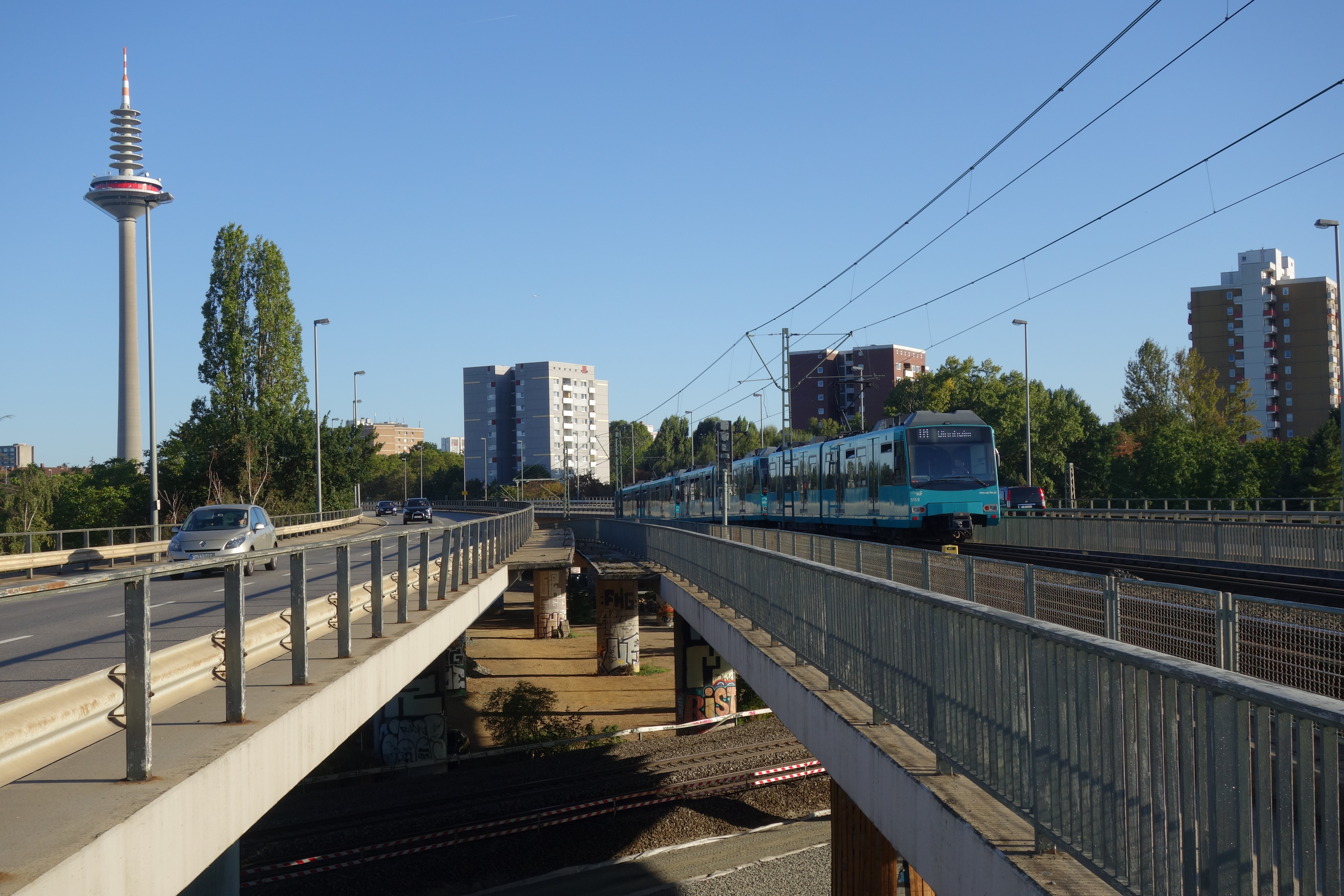
Frankfurt:U1 near Ginnheim

- Amsterdam Metro (except Line 52)
- Berlin S-Bahn (Berlin Stadtbahn and Siemensbahn)
- Berlin U-Bahn (U1 and U2 lines)
- Charleroi light rail (partial)
- Cologne Stadtbahn (line 13, partial)
- Copenhagen Metro (partial)
- Devon Metro (partial)
- Docklands Light Railway (partial)
- Frankfurt U-Bahn (U1) (partial)
- Hamburg U-Bahn (U3 line)
- Lille Metro (partial)
- London Overground (Windrush line) (partial)
- London Underground (partial)
- Manchester Metrolink (Partial)
- Moscow Metro (Butovskaya line)
- Paris Metro (Line 1, Line 2, Line 5, Line 6, Line 8, Line 11, Line 13 and future Grand Paris Express lines 17 and 18)(all partial)
- Rhine-Main S-Bahn (S3, S4, S5, S6) (partial)
- Rotterdam Metro (partial)
- Vienna S-Bahn (Vienna Stadtbahn)
- Vienna U-Bahn (U6 line)
- Wuppertal Suspension Railway

==== Oceania ====
- Metro Trains Melbourne, mainly built by the Level Crossing Removal Project
- Sydney Metro Northwest Line in Sydney, New South Wales, Australia (between Bella Vista and Tallawong)

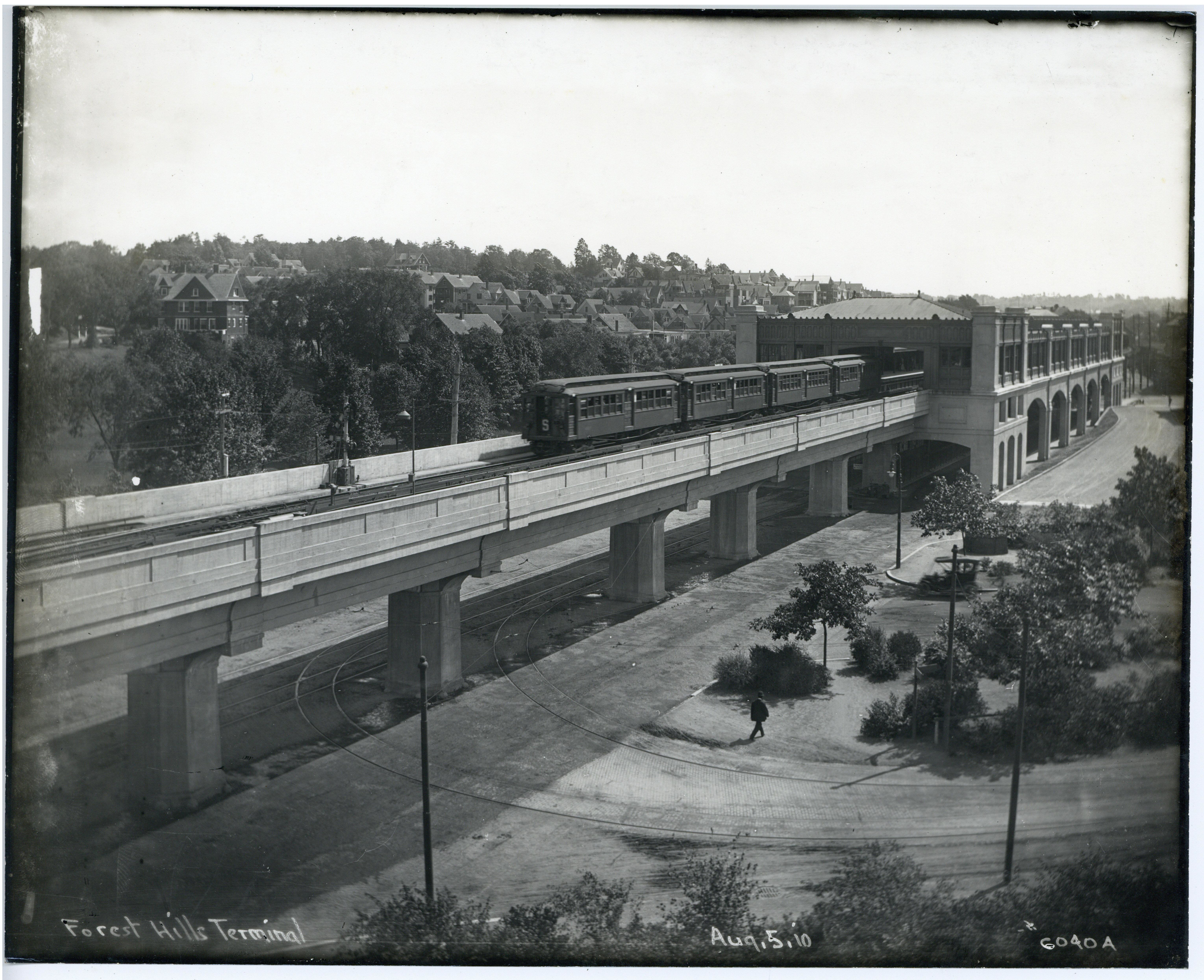
Washington Street Elevated in Boston (1910). The line was rebuilt in a cutting by 1987.

==== Disused ====
- Boston Elevated Railways: Atlantic Avenue Elevated, Charlestown Elevated, Washington Street Elevated, Causeway Street Elevated
- Elevated railways operated by the Interborough Rapid Transit Company and Brooklyn Rapid Transit Company in New York City
- Liverpool Overhead Railway
- The elevated Airport line of Kolkata Suburban Railway, closed in 2016 for reconstruction relating Kolkata Metro line 4
- Line 3 Scarborough, a medium capacity metro rail line in Toronto, Ontario, Canada (ceased operation in July 2023 due to derailment and age, will be replaced by an extension of Line 2)

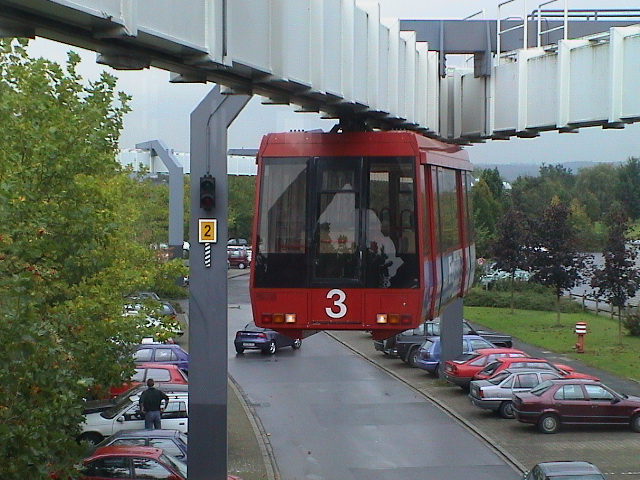
H-Bahn in Dortmund

=== People mover ===
- Tomorrowland Transit Authority PeopleMover, a people mover at and around Tomorrowland, Magic Kingdom, Walt Disney World Resort, Orlando, Florida, United States (partial)
- AirTrain JFK, a people mover at and around John F. Kennedy International Airport, New York City, New York, United States
- ATL Skytrain, a people mover at Hartsfield–Jackson Atlanta International Airport, Atlanta, Georgia, United States
- Changi Airport Skytrain, an inter-terminal people mover at Changi International Airport in Singapore
- Detroit People Mover, an urban transit people mover in Detroit, Michigan, United States
- Frankfurt Airport SkyLine, an inter-terminal automated people mover at the Frankfurt Airport, Germany
- H-Bahn, an inter-terminal automated people mover in Dortmund and Düsseldorf, Germany
- Jacksonville Skyway, an automated people mover in Jacksonville, Florida, United States
- Metromover, a people mover at Miami, Florida, United States
- PHX Sky Train, a people mover at Phoenix Sky Harbor International Airport, Phoenix, Arizona, United States
- Terminal Link, a people mover at Toronto Pearson International Airport, Toronto, Ontario, Canada

== Proposed designs ==
- Phnom Penh SkyTrain (Cambodia)
- Managua Metro (Nicaragua)
- San Salvador Metro (El Salvador)
- Ljubljana Metro (Slovenia)
- Transperth's Armadale line will be partially elevated by the Victoria Park-Canning Level Crossing Removal Project

== See also ==
- Bombardier Innovia family of automated rapid transit systems (elevated technologies - Monorail, APM, Metro)
- Elevator
- Embankment (transportation)
- Grade separation
- Monorail
- Railway
- Rapid transit
- People mover
