= Dortmunder Stadtwerke =

Public transport company in Germany

Coordinates: 51°30′20.15″N 7°29′8.82″E

Dortmunder Stadtwerke AG
- Company type: Aktiengesellschaft
- Industry: Municipal services, transport operator
- Predecessor: Dortmunder Aktiengesellschaft für Gasbeleuchtung
- Founded: June 18, 1857; 167 years ago in Dortmund, Germany
- Key people: Board of Directors (Vorstand): Guntram Pehlke (Chairman, Commercial Division), Harald Kraus (Director of Labor), Hubert Jung (Director of Transportation), Jörg Jacoby (Director of Finances)
- Owner: City of Dortmund (Stadt Dortmund)
- Website: www.einundzwanzig.de

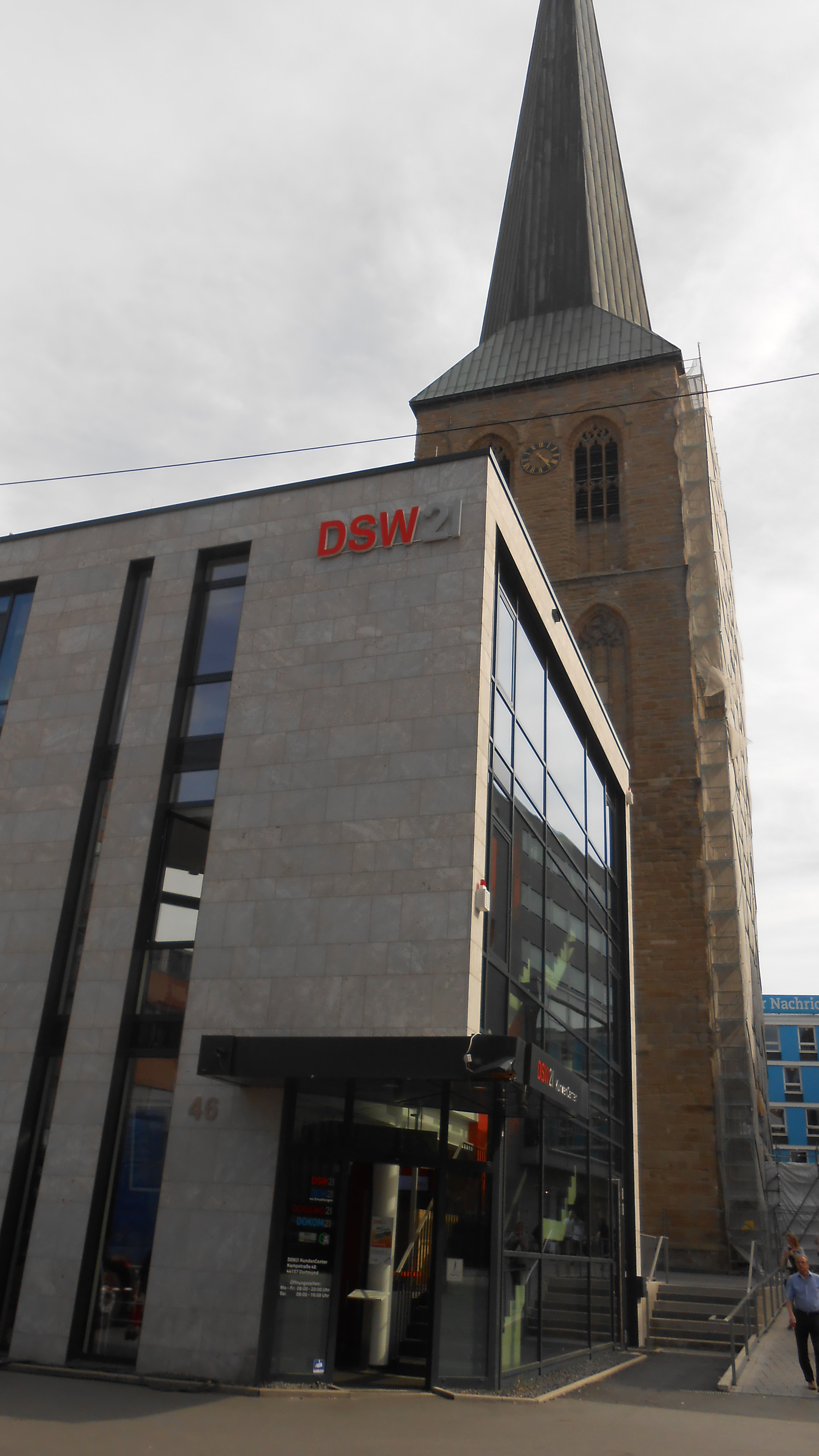
DSW21 customer center in Kampstraße, in front of Petri church.

Dortmunder Stadtwerke AG is a municipal services and public transport company in Dortmund, wholly owned by the city of Dortmund. It is operating under the brand DSW21 since 2005. The number in the acronym refers to the 21st century.

The development of the company began on June 19, 1857, when the Dortmunder Actien-Gesellschaft für Gasbeleuchtung was founded.

== Corporate structure ==
DSW21 holds stakes in a large number of subsidiaries with the business areas of public transportation, energy, telecommunications, information technology (IT), housing and urban development. Together with the City of Gelsenkirchen and Stadtwerke Bochum GmbH, DSW21 is thus, for example, the main shareholder of Gelsenwasser AG.

DSW21 is active in the following areas or divisions:

The housing division promotes urban development in Dortmund. The Stadtkrone Ost development project in Schüren, the Hohenbuschei site, the Lake Phoenix recreational area, and the Westfalentor project deserve special mention. However, the housing division also includes DOGEWO21, a municipal housing association with over 16,000 apartments in Dortmund.

The mobility and logistics division includes the transport division of DSW21 with over 1900 employees. However, it also includes the Port of Dortmund and the Dortmund suspension railway H-Bahn. The Dortmund Airport is co-owned by the city of Dortmund (26%) and Dortmunder Stadtwerke AG (74%). From 1999 to 2004 Dortmund-Märkische Eisenbahn (DME), a subsidiary of Dortmunder Stadtwerke (74%) and Märkische Verkehrsgesellschaft (26%), operated the Dortmund-Hagen-Lüdenscheid regional rail service.

The energy sector includes the energy supplier DEW21 (Dortmunder Energie- und Wasserversorgung) with over 1100 employees.

The data networks business unit is mainly operated through the telecommunications company DOKOM21.

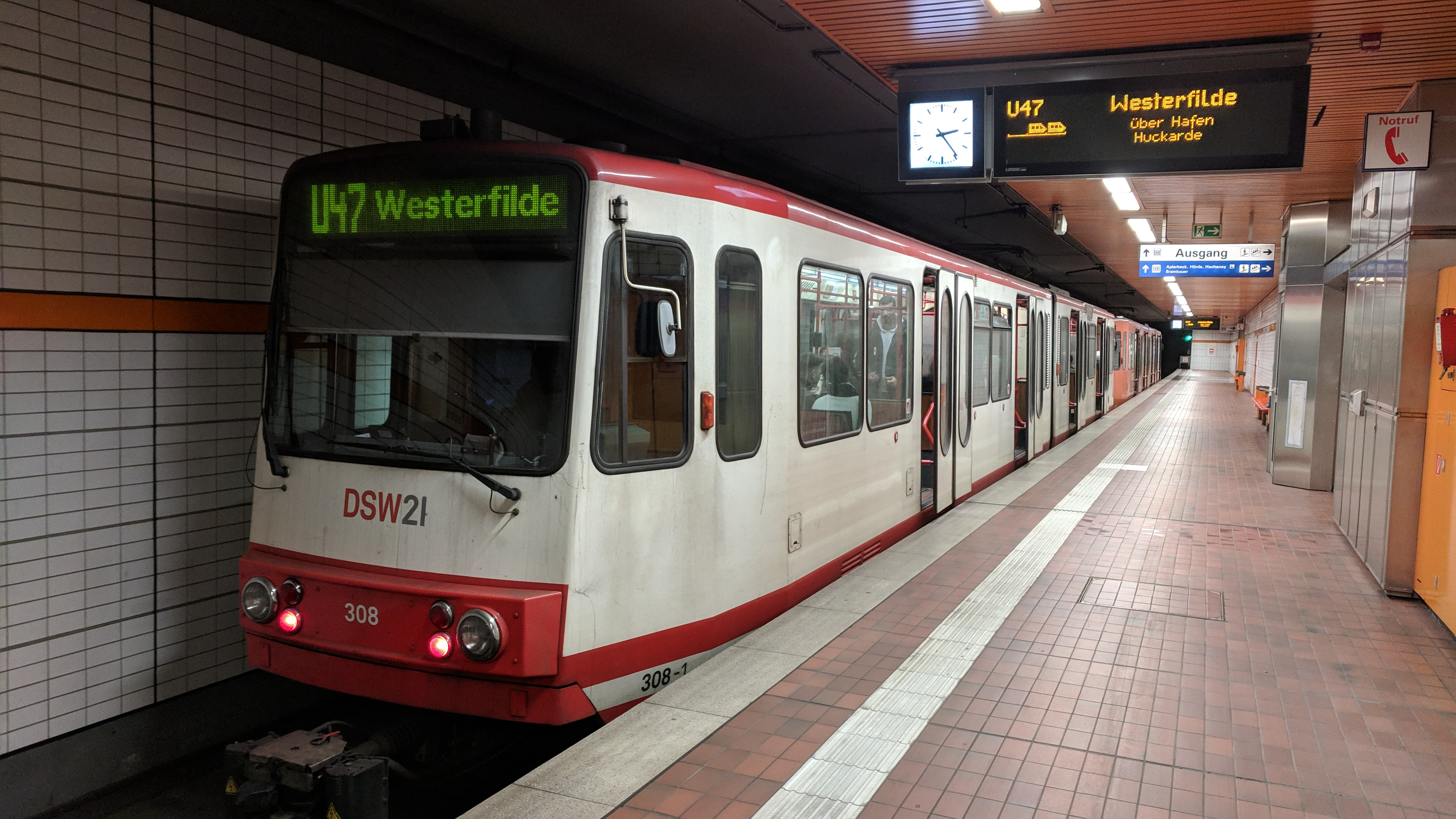
Dortmund Stadtbahn

== Mobility division ==
The mobility division of DSW21 is a partner company in the Verkehrsverbund Rhein-Ruhr (VRR), responsible for public transport in the city of Dortmund and the surrounding area. The business area overlaps with neighboring transport companies.

Dortmunder Stadtwerke AG (DSW21) operates a total of eight light rail lines (see also: Dortmund Stadtbahn) and 76 bus lines. In 2018, it transported a total of around 130.3 million passengers on its 1107.6-kilometer network, covering approximately 20,780,000 kilometers. It used 47 streetcar cars, 74 light rail cars and 172 buses for transportation. Due to the COVID-19 pandemic, the number of passengers dropped by 20% in the first quarter of 2021.

The company is a member of the Eastern Ruhr Area Cooperation (Kooperation östliches Ruhrgebiet).
