= Skybus Metro =

Prototype suspended railway system

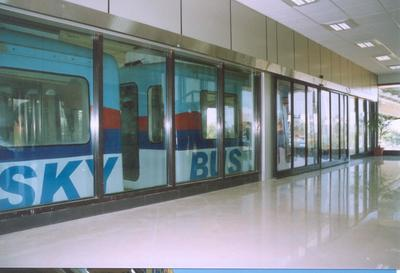
- A Skybus Metro car at a station

Overview
- Area served: Margao, Goa
- Transit type: Suspended railway
- Number of lines: 1
- Number of stations: 1

Operation
- Began operation: Never entered service
- Operator: Konkan Railway
- Rolling stock: BEML
- Train length: 18.5 m (61 ft)

Technical
- System length: 1.6 km (0.99 mi)
- Minimum radius of curvature: 100 m (330 ft)
- Top speed: 100 km/h (62 mph)

The Skybus Metro was a prototype suspended railway system by Indian technologist B. Rajaram with the BEML and Konkan Railway which is patented by the Indian Railways. The system consisted of an elevated track with the cars suspended below, similar to the Wuppertal Schwebebahn or H-Bahn systems in Germany.

A 1.6 km (1 mi) test track in Margao, Goa started trials in 2004, but on 25 September, one employee was killed and three injured in an accident, ending the trial. The test track was supposed to be extended to 10.5 km, but no progress was made after the accident. In 2013, the Konkan Railway dismantled the line.

== Construction ==
Skybus can run at 100 km/h using electric power, with suspended cars that carry the passengers.

=== Tracks ===
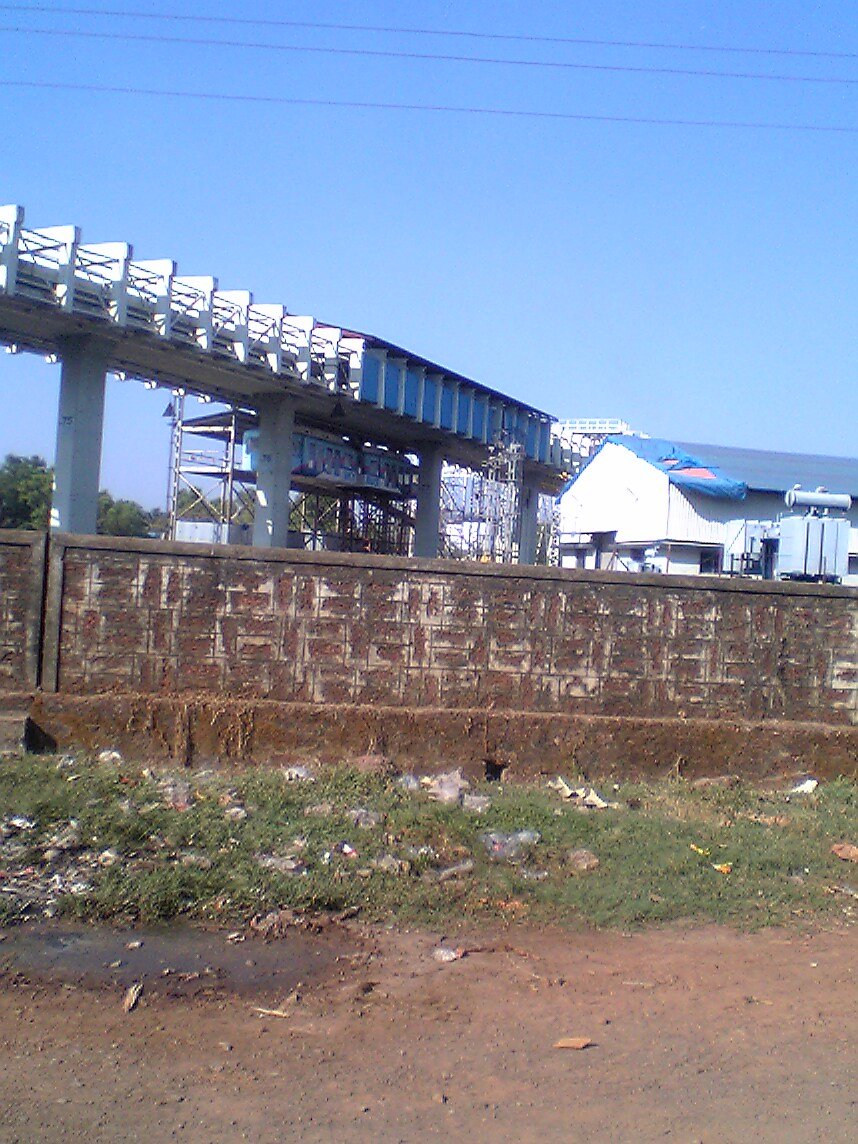
A Skybus Metro Railcar suspended at a station on the track at Margao, Goa, India. The system looks like a "monorail" but there are two conventional steel rails on the overhead concrete beam, with the car hanging from this.

Heavy 52 kilograms per metre (100 lb/yd) rails of standard gauge are placed in 8 m x 2 m-box enclosures of reinforced concrete. These double-track enclosures are supported over 1 m diameter columns 10 m tall, spaced at 15-20 m intervals on pile foundation. This structure was planned to run in the divider space between road lanes, so Skybus Metro follows existing road routes without disturbing at-grade traffic. The steepest gradient possible was 1.75 % and the sharpest curve had a radius of 100 m. The maximum radius of a vertical curve was 3,375 m.

=== Bogies ===
BEML had signed a memorandum of understanding with KRC for exclusive manufacture and supply of innovative Skybus bogies, the prototype development of Skybus for the first time in the country.

Two standard axle "bogies" provide the drive mechanism. Each bogie is driven by 3-phase alternating current (AC) motor. A third rail provides power. Braking is either regenerative (returning electricity to the grid) with supplemental disc and (emergency) mechanical braking. Power is delivered to the vehicles using brushes or by current carrying wheels.

=== Coaches ===
The coaches are double walled lightweight shells with wide larger windows and are suspended below the rails. The air conditioned coaches have 4 m-wide automatic doors. They offer audiovisual information to passengers. Each pair of coaches carries 300 passengers. Each coach is 9.25 m long and 3.2 m wide. "Trains" consist of two coaches, with total length of 18.5 m.

=== Traverser ===
The traverser automatically shifts units between tracks. The traverser is a modified form of transverser used in others industries for lifting & shifting objects. In the traverser a platform of track is hung to a bogie which consist of a motor and is also mounted on the track. The traverser acts like a station. A distance of 50 m from the last station to the traverser is maintained to provide holding capacity for two units as a third unit is getting traversed in case of unforeseen delay.

=== Station ===
The station is an air-conditioned platform 5.5 m above ground. Stations have automatic doors and lifts. A smart card opens the station door. The station fits in a 50 m long spot.

== Trials ==
In 2004 the Konkan Railway carried out a trial of Skybus in Margao, Goa with the help of Goa state government. On 25 September, one employee was killed and three injured in an accident when the coaches hit the concrete track pillars, ending the trial.

Managing director Bhanu Prakash Tayal shared that KRC was unable to engineer critical components like the "swing arrestor" and "switching apparatus" which could have potentially addressed the safety concerns that surrounded the project since the 2004 accident.

Rajaram defended Skybus, stating that the accident was avoidable.

== Closure ==
In October, 2013 the Konkan Railway Corporation (KRC) decided to discontinue the Skybus project to curb expenses. The 1.6 km test track was dismantled as a result of the decision. The KRC had solicited interest from foreign firms to maintain and upgrade the test track; this was met with poor response which also contributed to the decision to dismantle.

== Revival discussions ==
The state government of Goa considered reviving Skybus for a north-south metro rail project in 2018.

Union Minister for Road Transport and Highways Nitin Gadkari has advocated for building Skybus systems for Delhi-Gurgaon, Bengaluru, and Pune. In October 2023, he visited a suspended train system build by uSky Technologies in Sharjah, United Arab Emirates.

== See also ==
- Bennie Railplane
- H-Bahn
- List of monorail systems
- Memphis Suspension Railway
- Mumbai Monorail
- Rail transport in India
- Schwebebahn Dresden
- Transport in India
- Wuppertal Schwebebahn
