= Optics Valley Suspended Monorail =

Suspended monorail line in Wuhan, China

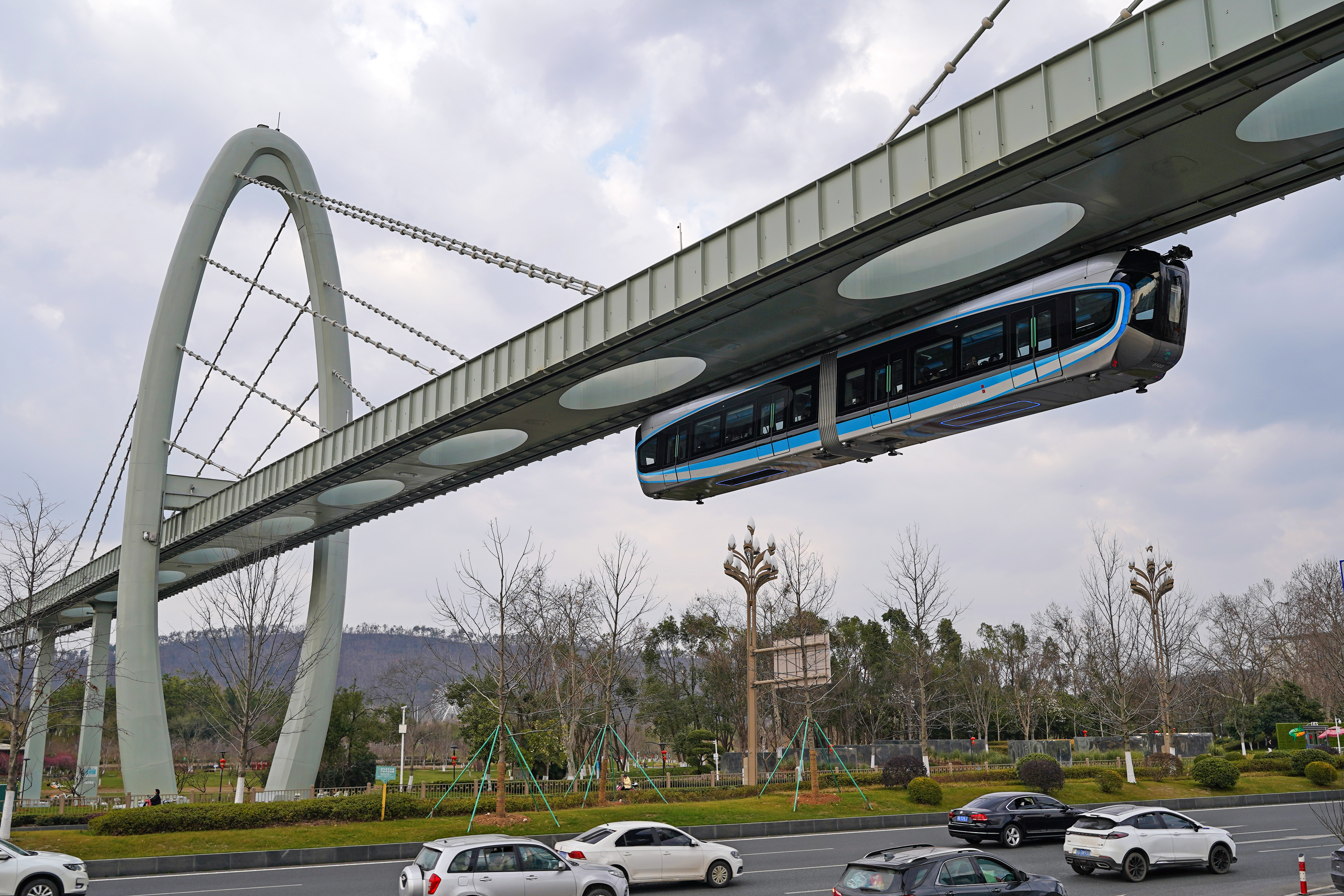
- A carriage crossing over a road.

Overview
- Native name: 光谷空轨
- Status: Operational
- Locale: Donghu New Technology Development Zone, Wuhan
- Termini: Jiufengshan station; Longquanshan station
- Stations: 6
- Website: www.whggjtjs.com

Service
- Type: Rapid transit
- System: Wuhan Metro
- Operator(s): Wuhan Optics Valley Modern Tram Corp., Ltd
- Depot: Longquanshan depot
- Rolling stock: 6-car Type B (DKZ32)
- Daily ridership: <13,000

History
- Opened: 26 September 2023; 2 years ago

Technical
- Line length: 10.5 km (6.5 mi)
- Character: Suspended monorail
- Electrification: 750 V DC
- Operating speed: 60 km/h (37 mph) (maximum operating speed)

The Optics Valley Suspended Monorail (光谷空轨), also known as the Optics Valley Photon, is a driverless suspended monorail line located in Wuhan, Hubei, China. It is the first suspended monorail line in China, opening on September 26, 2023. The line has six stations and a total length of 10.5 kilometers, with plans for the line to be extended to a second phase with a total length of 26.7 kilometers and 16 stations.

The route runs along the 10-kilometer-long Optics Valley Ecological Corridor (光谷生态大走廊), an ecological corridor between 300 and 500 meters wide connecting Jiufengshan mountain in the north to Longquanshan mountain in the south. The railway is located in the southeast of Wuhan, in the Donghu New Technology Development Zone, also known as Guanggu or Optics Valley. The line was designed for both commuting and sightseeing.

== History ==
On May 31, 2019, the Wuhan East Lake High-tech Zone Management Committee held a "Special Meeting on Optics Valley Central Ecological Corridor and Aerial Rail Concept Plan" to plan the construction of this line.

In January 2020, the Administrative Committee held a special meeting to study the ecological corridor project, agreed in principle to the first phase of the Optics Valley Ecological Corridor Tourism Line Project (Jiufengshan-Longquanshan) line, station, and vehicle base planning plan, and requested that the piles be completed as soon as possible.

On November 22, 2021, Wuhan Optics Valley Transportation Construction Co., Ltd. and Wuhan Optics Valley Tourism Development Investment Co., Ltd. (a wholly owned subsidiary of the former, established in July 2020) initiated an online vote on the vehicle name and appearance. On December 1, Optics Valley Transportation and Optics Valley Tourism Investment announced the voting results. The vehicles are named the "Optical Valley Photon" and the appearance design adopts the "Technology Wing Plan".

On August 26, 2022, the first Photon train rolled off the assembly line. On December 26 of the same year, it was tested at the Longquan Vehicle Base.

The entire line became open to traffic in early 2023, and comprehensive joint commissioning and testing began in February, with test rides starting on May 11. At 10:00 a.m. on September 26, 2023, the line was officially put into operation.

== Stations ==
All transfers are out-of-station.

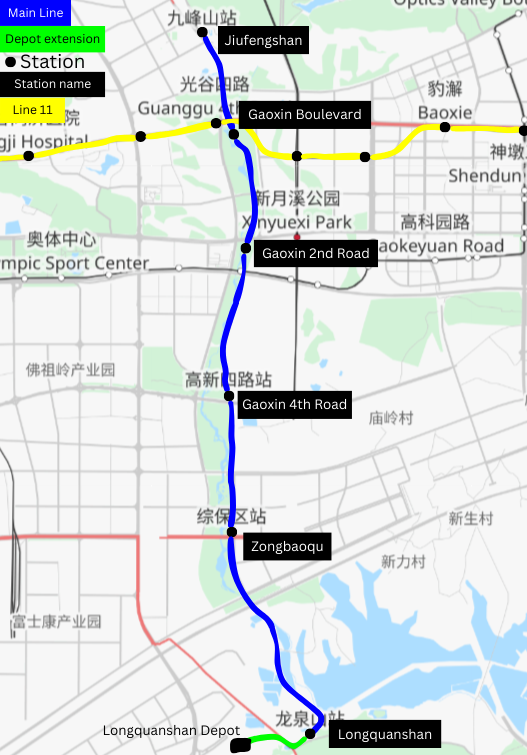
The map of the route

| Station Name | | Connections |
| English | Chinese | Connections |
|---|---|---|
| Jiufengshan | 九峰山 | |
| Gaoxin Boulevard | 高新大道 | 11 (via Guanggu 4th Road) |
| Gaoxin 2nd Road | 高新二路 | Optics Valley Tram (via Optics Valley 4th Road) |
| Gaoxin 4th Road | 高新四路 | |
| Zongbaoqu | 综保区 | |
| Longquanshan | 龙泉山 | |

== Specifications ==
The train car contains two carriages and can hold 220 people at maximum. The maximum speed of the railway is 60 kilometers per hour, and the train can append more carriages if there is high demand. It runs from 8:00 a.m. to 8:00 p.m. in ten-minute intervals.
