= Jetrail =

Suspended monorail system

Coordinates: 32.837592°N 96.842467°W

Overview
- Owner: Braniff International Airways
- Locale: Dallas Love Field, Dallas, Texas, U.S.
- Transit type: Monorail
- Number of lines: 1
- Number of stations: 3
- Annual ridership: 2.5 million during 1973

Operation
- Began operation: April 18, 1970
- Ended operation: January 13, 1974
- Operator: Braniff International Airways
- Number of vehicles: 10
- Headway: 10-20 seconds

Technical
- System length: 1.75 mi (2.82 km)
- Average speed: 13 mph

Braniff Jetrail Fastpark System was a suspended monorail system that operated at Dallas Love Field in Dallas, Texas, United States, from April 18, 1970, until January 13, 1974. It was built by Stanray Corporation, Chicago, Illinois, for and operated by Braniff International Airways to transport passengers and their luggage from remote parking lots to the airport terminal.

Jetrail was the world's first fully automated monorail transit system. The system, however, continued in operation when Braniff moved the majority of its operations to Dallas/Fort Worth International Airport on January 13, 1974. Braniff continued to operate intrastate service from Love Field to both Houston Hobby and San Antonio International Airports, to compete with Southwest Airlines, until September 1, 1974. At that time, all Jetrail operations ceased.

== History ==
=== System and operations ===
Jetrail was invented and designed by George Adams, president of Mobility Systems Control, Inc. of Los Angeles. Braniff International wanted an inexpensive automated system to carry people from a remote parking lot 4,200 feet (1,300 m) to Braniff's new "Terminal of the Future." The $2 million system consisted of ten fully air conditioned and heated 12-foot-long (3.7 m) suspended Jetrail Passenger Coaches, each with a capacity of 10 passengers (6 seated and 4 standing) plus hand baggage. Each Coach was painted in vibrant colors that matched those painted on Braniff's jet aircraft. The colors were designed by architect and designer Alexander Girard and the New York City design firm of Harper and George, but the general design of Jetrail's Air Coach and stanchion color schemes and interior areas were designed by the Airline's interior designer Chuck Ax. Two separate all-baggage cars were also used, allowing passengers to check luggage before boarding the vehicle.

=== Jetrail Stations ===
The system consisted of a single closed loop 8,400 feet (2,600 m) in length and elevated 25 feet (7.6 m) above ground with six switches. Bypass tracks were located at each end of the loop for vehicle storage and maintenance. Stations were located at the end of each loop: one in the parking lot and the other near the concourse gates. A third station was located on the line to the parking lot beside the baggage claim area. The total travel time averaged 3.5 minutes—much faster than buses and cars it replaced.

=== Passenger Usage ===
Forty-seven percent of Braniff's passengers used the system, with ridership of 4 million passengers in the first full year of operation and 2.5 million passengers in the last year of service. Over the life of the system, Jetrail moved over 10,000,000 passengers. The system logged an impressive 500,000 vehicle-miles per year and operated with a 99.9% reliability.

=== Passenger Selected Automatic Control ===
Jetrail was automatically controlled with elevator type buttons and demonstrated that a very lightweight guideway could be built and would adequately support the vehicles. Originally powered by rotary induction motors, the system was later adapted to linear induction motor propulsion. Replacing the two rotary induction motors and the associated mechanical drive system with a single linear induction motor (LIM) producing four hundred pounds thrust reduced the shuttle car weight by one ton and the single LIM increased the car speed from seventeen to thirty six miles per hour.

=== Proposed Uses of Jetrail After Closure ===
Braniff International moved the majority of its operations to the new Dallas/Fort Worth International Airport in January, 1974, which prompted the closure of Jetrail services after only four years of highly successful operation. Soon after closure, the Jetrail Fastpark Satellite Terminal was turned into a multilevel discothèque in 1975. The city of Waco, Texas, considered using the system for an urban project but the idea was later abandoned. A hotel in Memphis, Tennessee, also considered buying the system, but the system was not long enough. Additional plans to sell the system to the City of Dallas and Holiday Inn, also failed to materialize. Without a buyer, the Jetrail System was dismantled during 1978.
