= SAFEGE =

French company, subsidiary of Suez

SAFEGE (/ˈseɪfiːʒ/) is a French consulting and engineering firm, founded as a consortium of 25 companies including Michelin and Renault. The name is an acronym for Société Anonyme Française d'Etude de Gestion et d'Entreprises (lit. 'French Limited Company for the Study of Management and Business').

SAFEGE was originally founded in 1919 as Société Auxiliaire Française d'Électricité, Gaz et Eau (lit. 'French Auxiliary Company for Electricity, Gas and Water'), a holding company with interests in private water, gas, and electricity production and distribution. Following the nationalization of these public utilities in 1947, the company was reorganized as an engineering and consulting firm.

Today, SAFEGE operates as a subsidiary of Suez, specializing in water and environmental engineering. The majority of its business activity—around 60% of turnover—is based in France.

== SAFEGE type monorail ==
The SAFEGE consortium developed a type of suspension railway technology in the late 1950s. The design team was headed by engineer Lucien Chadenson.

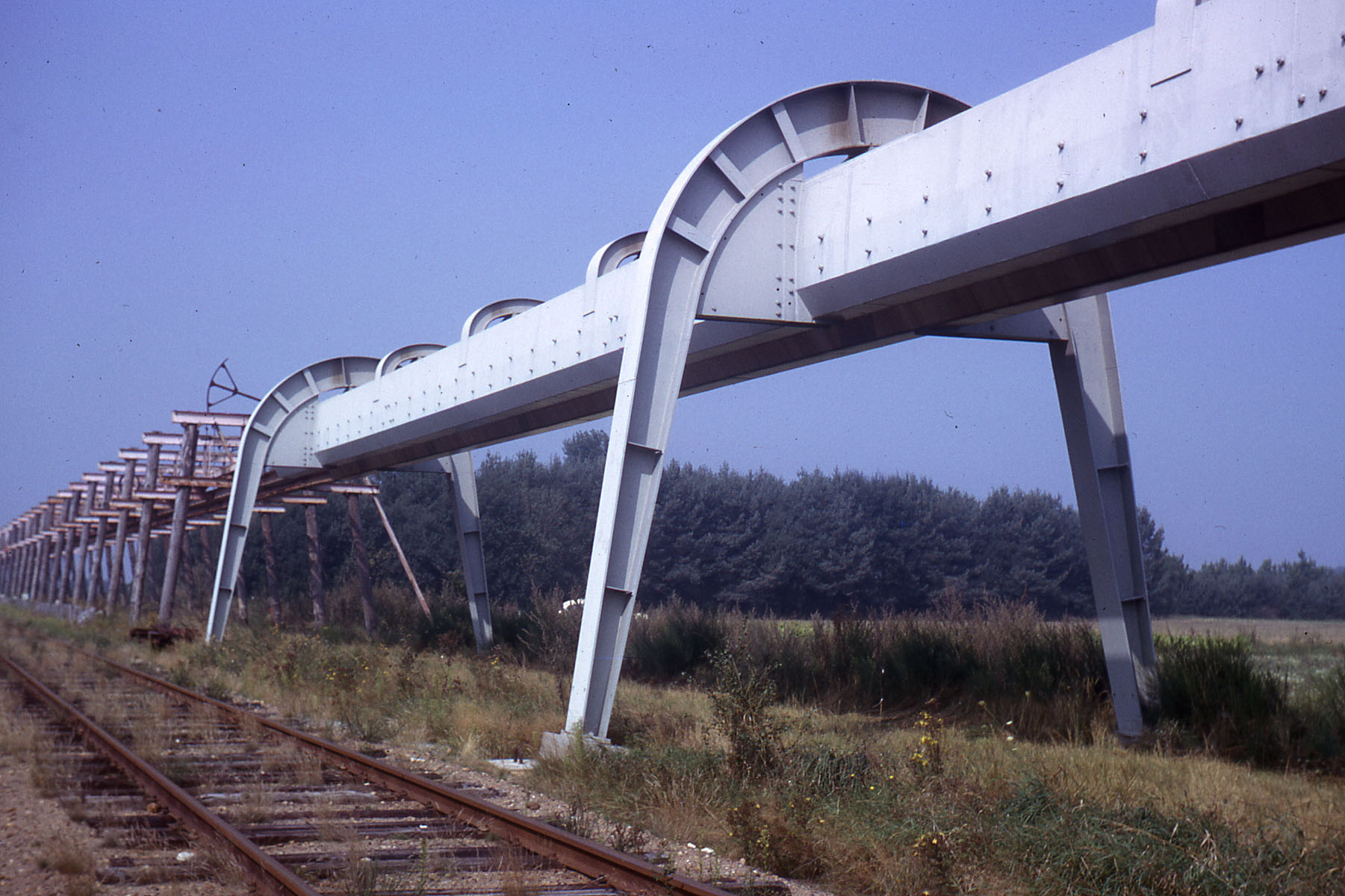
SAFEGE test track in Châteauneuf-sur-Loire, 1963

The system was conceived as a potential extension of the Paris Métro, intended to connect Charenton to Créteil, southeast of Paris. Construction of a full-scale 1.4-kilometre (0.87 mi) test track began in April 1959 and was completed in April 1960. Testing continued until 1967. The test track appeared prominently in the 1966 film Fahrenheit 451. It was demolished between 1970 and 1971, though at least one prototype vehicle was preserved for some years afterward.

The SAFEGE system adapted the rubber-tired bogie used on the Paris Métro by mounting it inside a hollow steel box girder from which passenger cars were suspended. The bogies ran along the interior of the enclosed beam, with a narrow slot along the underside allowing suspension arms to connect to the cars below. The cars were mounted on a pendulum-type suspension with pneumatic springs, providing stability and comfort at higher speeds. As on the Paris Métro, steel emergency wheels were fitted alongside the tires in case of deflation.

Enclosing the running gear protected it from rain, ice, and snow, addressing a major limitation of earlier rubber-tired metro systems and suspended monorails such as the Wuppertal Schwebebahn in Germany.

=== SAFEGE-type monorails in the world ===
Although the SAFEGE system gained international attention for its innovative enclosed-beam design, only a few such systems were built, compared with the more widely adopted ALWEG-type straddle-beam monorails. Despite its French origins, no SAFEGE systems were constructed in France. In Japan, however, two suspended monorails based on the SAFEGE design were successfully built and remain in operation. The German company Siemens later developed a smaller-scale suspended monorail system inspired by the SAFEGE concept.

==== Mitsubishi Heavy Industries ====
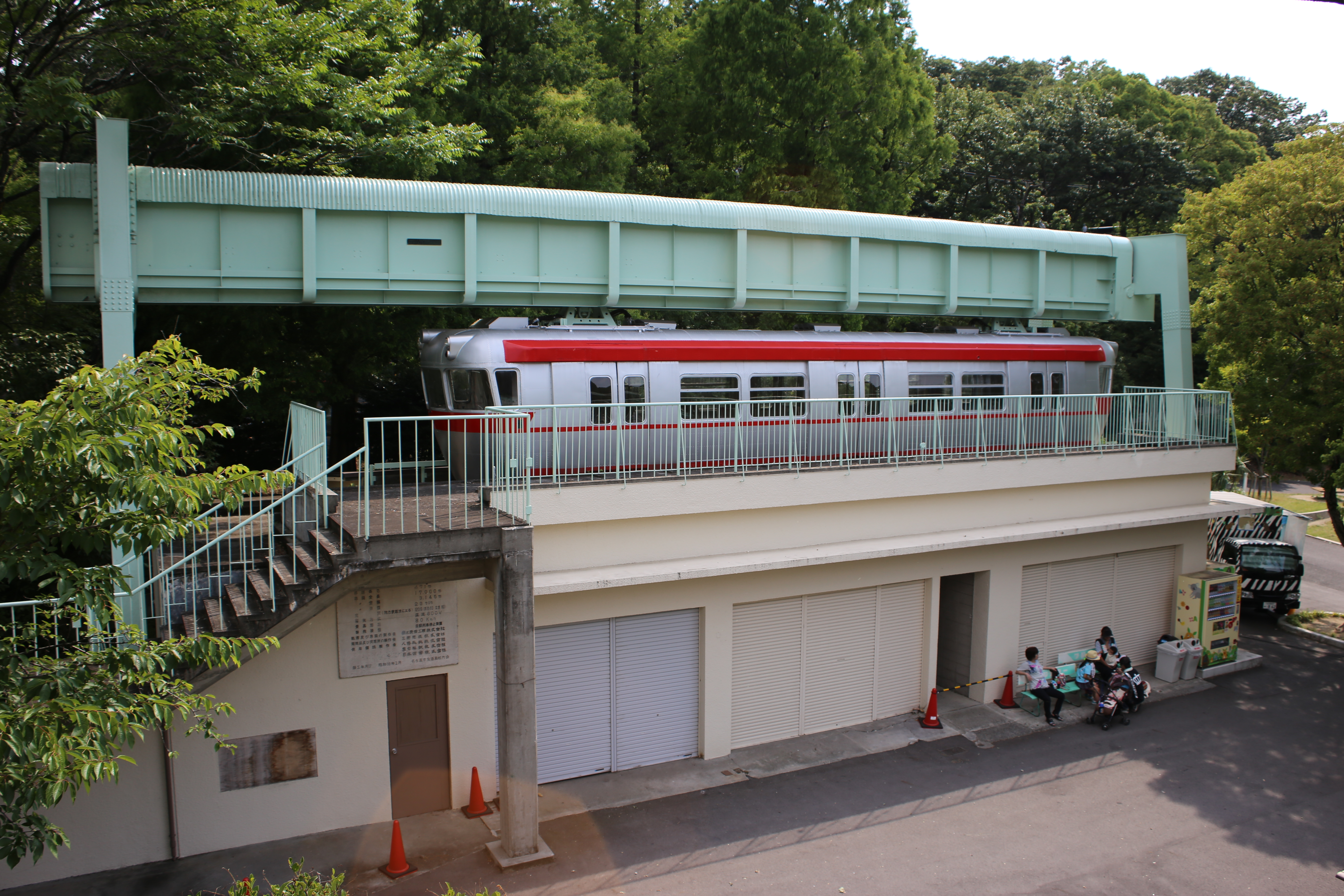
The preserved car and track of the Higashiyama Zoo Monorail in 2017

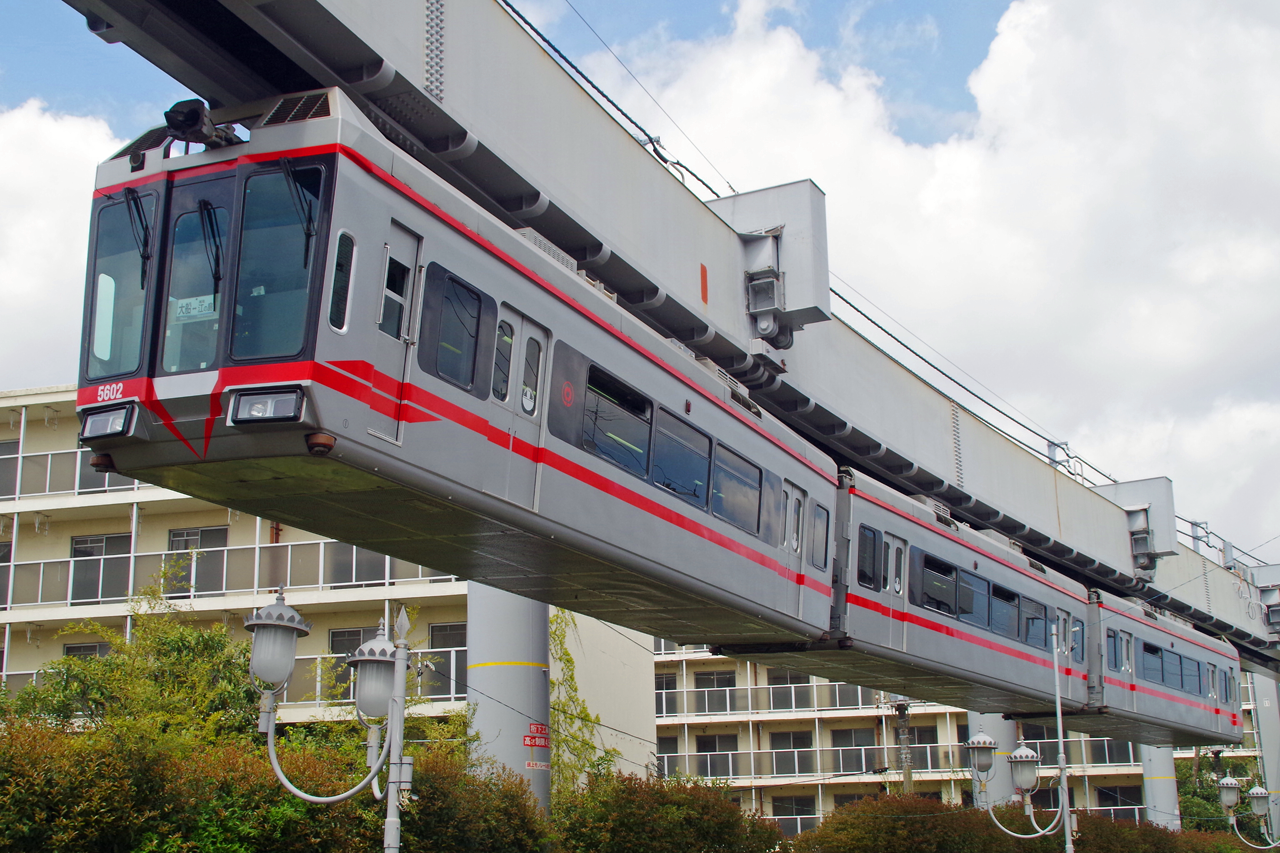
Shonan Monorail in 2015

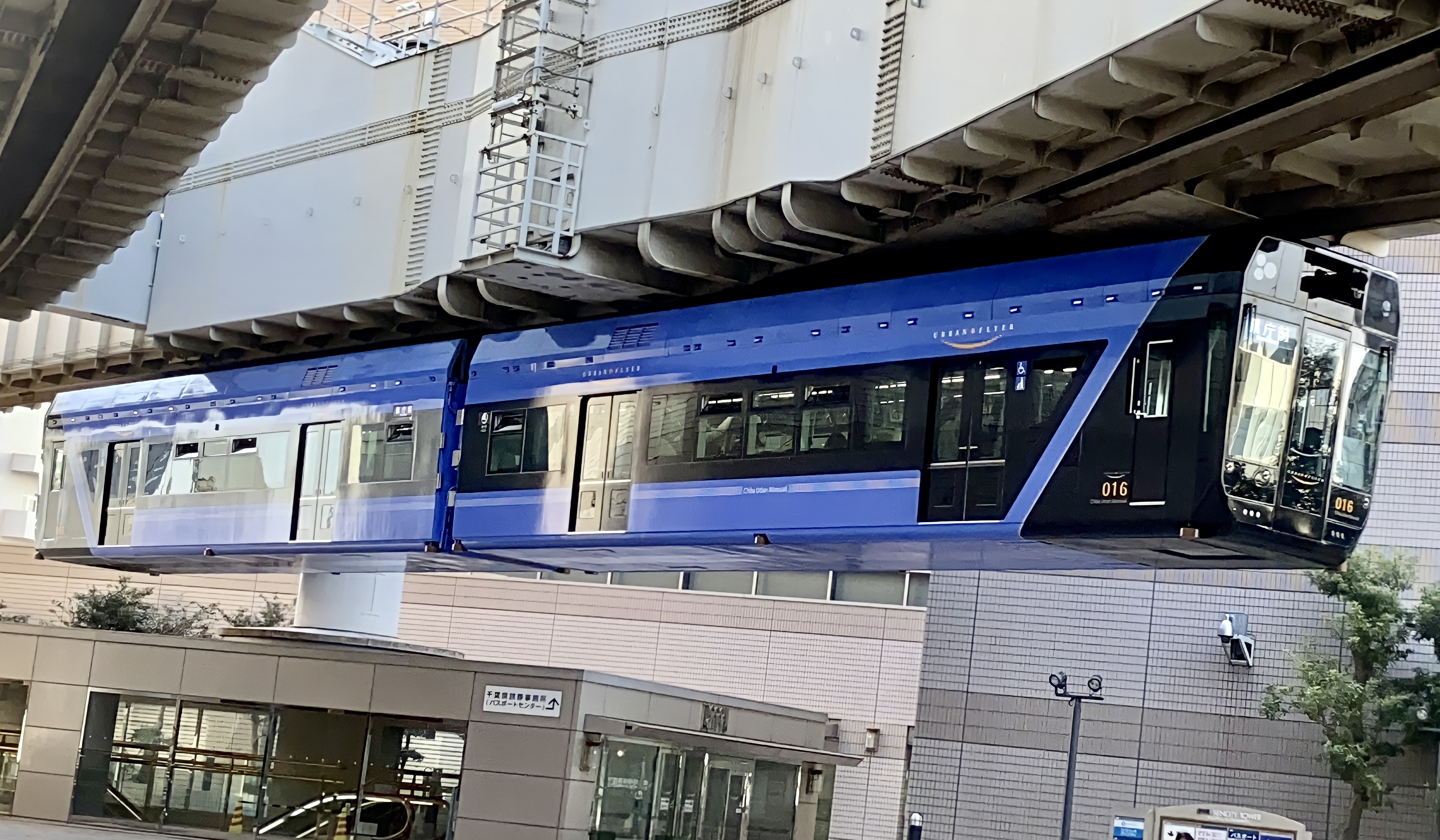
Chiba Urban Monorail in 2020

Mitsubishi Heavy Industries of Japan licensed the suspended railway technology from SAFEGE and developed three installations, two of which remain in operation.

- From early 1964 to December 1974, a 0.5-kilometre (0.31 mi) single-line ran between Higashiyama Zoo and the nearby Botanical Gardens in Nagoya, Japan. Although initially popular, it experienced mechanical issues, and after the first two years ridership declined. Plans to expand the zoo and gardens led to its closure, but one of the cars and a short section of track were preserved at a station site. Although marketed primarily as an amusement ride, it charged a fare, making it the first revenue-earning SAFEGE-type monorail.
- In 1970, the Shonan Monorail opened, running from Ōfuna Station in Kamakura to Shōnan-Enoshima Station in Fujisawa.
- In 1988, the first stage of the Chiba Urban Monorail system opened in Chiba. With a route length of 15.2 kilometres (9.4 mi) and two lines, route length, it is the longest suspended monorail in the world.

==== Siemens ====
Siemens Mobility developed a suspended railway technology known as the H-Bahn or SIPEM for SIemens PEople Mover in the early 1970s.Although it employs a similar enclosed box-girder track to the SAFEGE system, it was not directly licensed from SAFEGE and incorporates several technical differences. Siemens built two such installations, both of which remain in operation. While Siemens no longer actively markets the system, it continues to supply software for the automated operation of existing SIPEM networks and vehicles.

- In 1984, the first operational H-Bahn opened on the campus of Dortmund University.
- In 2002, the SkyTrain monorail opened at Düsseldorf Airport

==== Unfulfilled proposals ====
In 1966, a proposal was considered to construct a SAFEGE-type monorail in Manchester, England. The 16-mile (26 km) line was planned to link Manchester Airport with the city centre and suburbs, including a tunnel beneath the central area. The project, along with the Picc-Vic tunnel proposal for a conventional underground line, was abandoned due to cost. Manchester later developed the Metrolink, a light rail network, one line of which, opened in 2014, now connects Manchester Airport to the city centre.

In November 1967, General Electric proposed constructing a SAFEGE-type monorail linking downtown San Francisco with San Francisco International Airport. The proposal was studied by the City of San Francisco alongside alternatives, including an extension of the Southern Pacific Railroad's Peninsula Commute service and an extension of the BART rapid transit system. Concerns about incompatibility with other rail systems, the visual impact of an elevated structure, and potential competition with existing and planned rapid transit lines led to the proposal's rejection in favor of a BART extension. SFO was ultimately connected to downtown San Francisco by BART in 2003.
