= Suspension railway =

Overhead monorail

A suspension railway is a form of elevated monorail in which the vehicle is suspended from a fixed track (as opposed to a cable used in aerial tramways), which is built above streets, waterways, or existing railway track.

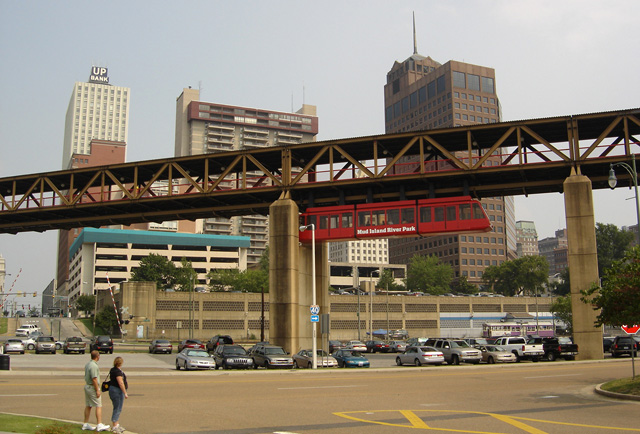
The Memphis Suspension Railway

== History ==
=== Experimental demonstrations ===
==== Palmer System and Cheshunt Railway ====
The British engineer Henry Robinson Palmer (1795–1844) filed a patent application for a horse-drawn suspended single-rail system in 1821, and constructed a demonstration at Woolwich Arsenal, in England soon afterwards.

German industrial pioneer, thinker and politician Friedrich Harkort built a demonstration track of Palmer's system in 1826, in Elberfeld, Germany, at the time commercial centre of the early industrial area Wupper Valley. The steelmill owner had the vision of a coal-carrier railway between Wupper Valley and the nearby coal-mining region of Ruhr, which would connect his own factories in Elberfeld and Deilbachtal. Due to protests from mill owners that were not integrated along the line and from the transporting branch, this idea could not be executed.

The first suspended railway was opened at Cheshunt, England, United Kingdom on 25 June 1825, using Palmer's patent. It was built to carry bricks, but as an opening stunt it carried passengers.

A work, Description of the suspension railway invented by Maxwell Dick: with engravings By Maxwell Dick, published in Irvine, Scotland, in 1830, refers to an aerial tramway/cable car system.

==== Enos Electric Railway ====
The Enos Electric Railway, an electric-powered monorail with wagons suspended from an elevated frame of open steelwork, was demonstrated in the grounds of the Daft Electric Company in Greenville, New Jersey, in 1886. It was built out of lightweight steel construction and worked well, but was never expanded. In July 1888 a 1.2 mi test track made of wood with a maximum incline of 1:14 and a minimum radius of 12 yards was opened in South Park near Saint Paul, Minnesota. It was planned to build a 25 mi double tracked line from St. Paul to Minneapolis within two years by costs of 2.9 million USD per mile (current purchasing power).

The design of the rail-frame appears to have influenced Eugen Langen, as his Wuppertal Schwebebahn framing bears a remarkable likeness to the Enos construction.

==== Russian Empire experiment ====
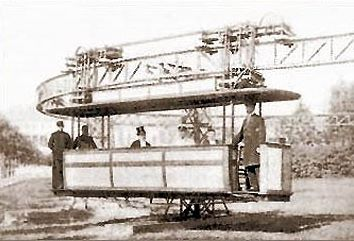
Monorail by Ippolit V. Romanov

In March 1895, Russian engineer Ippolit Romanov (originally from Tbilisi, Georgia) built a prototype of an electric monorail in Odessa, modern-day Ukraine. In 1897, he presented a functional model of his monorail at the meeting of Russian technological society. This idea was approved by the society, and an experimental electric monorail was built in 1899. In 1900, Empress Maria Fedorovna approved the building of an 0.2 kilometres (0.12 mi) long electric monorail in Gatchina. The monorail was tested on 25 June 1900. The monorail carriage could be loaded with up to 25 kilograms (55 lb) and moved at a speed of 15 kilometres per hour (9.3 mph).

=== Introduction of operational lines (1900s) ===
==== Wuppertal's Electrical Elevated Railway or "floating tram" ====
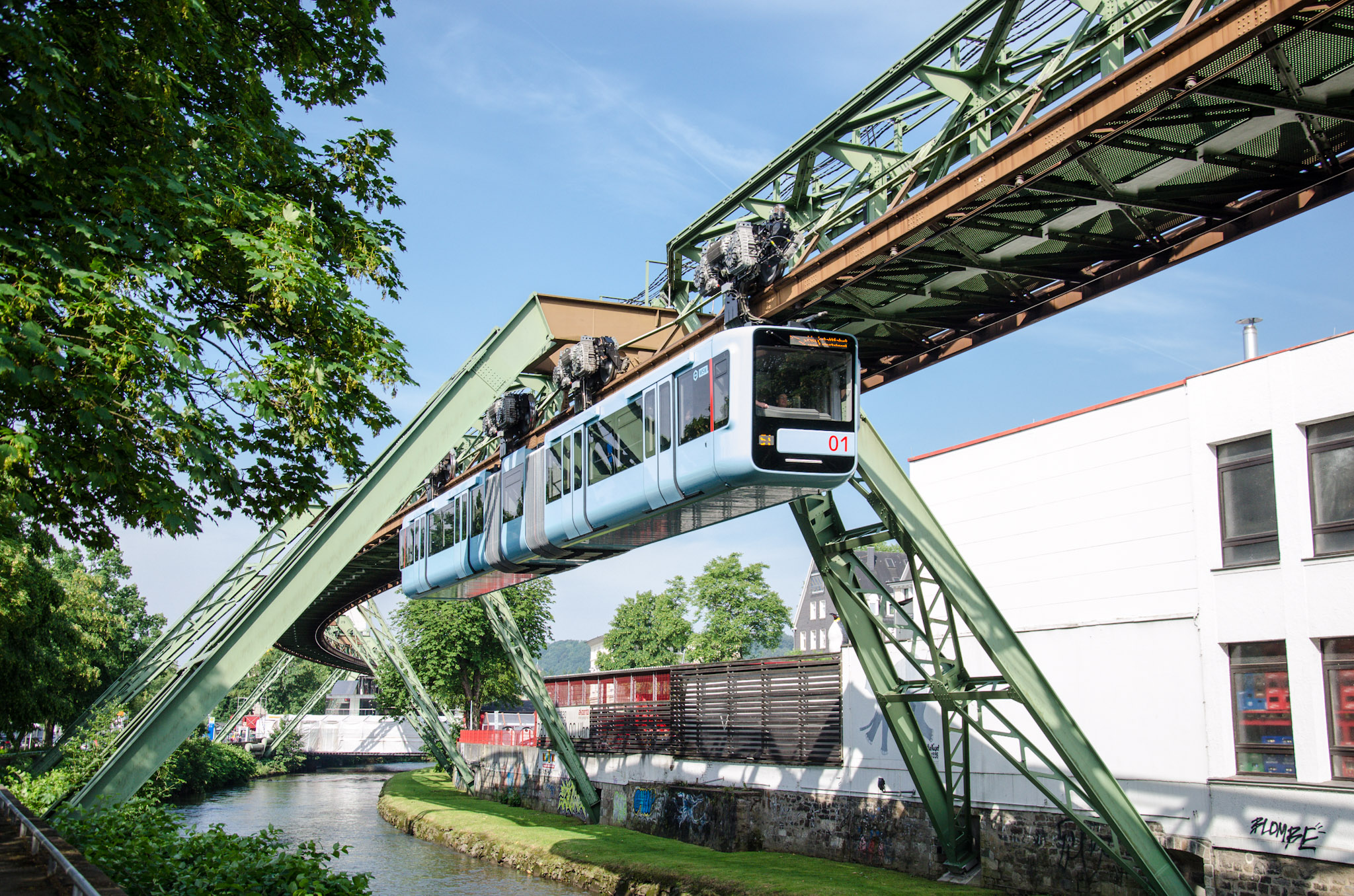
Section of the Schwebebahn installation in Wuppertal, Germany

During the 1880s the German businessman and engineer Eugen Langen experimented in his Cologne sugar factory with a low one-track suspension railway system for the transportation of raw materials. He was a business partner of Nicolaus Otto, the inventor of the internal-combustion engine, and probably knew the Palmer Railway. In the nearby expanding industrial zone of Wupper Valley, entrepreneurs and governors were looking for a modern urban transportation system. A cooperation between politicians and businessmen from the Barmen-Elberfeld industrial area around 1890 led to the implementation of an electric powered elevated railway system from the factory of Otto and Langen, now Deutz. The official name was Anlage einer elektrischen Hochbahn (Schwebebahn), System Eugen Langen Köln or Electrical Elevated Railroad ("Floating tram") Installation, System Eugen Langen Cologne. The installation and stations were built by three companies, among them the company of Friedrich Harkort.

In 1901 the first track of the Wuppertal Schwebebahn opened, and still runs today. In 1903 it was extended to the final length of 13.3 kilometres (8.3 mi). This system is still in operation as a means of public transport, moving over 20 million passengers each year.

==== Dresden Suspension Railway ====
Langen also designed the Dresden Suspension Railway, a short funicular railway using the same suspended monorail technology, which opened in 1901 and is still in operation.

=== 1930s ===
A unique demonstration electrically powered suspension line was built by the Scottish engineer George Bennie near Glasgow. Two propellers delivered 240 horsepower (180 kW) in a short burst for acceleration to the cruise speed of 160 km/h. It was not a true monorail as it used an overhead running rail and a guide rail below.

=== 1950s ===
In 1947, Lucien Chadenson became interested in the Bennie Railplane experimental line, and the Paris Metro Route 11, which uses rubber tyres. A test track operated in Chateauneuf, south of Paris from 1958, but attracted no further interest in France. However, the Japanese have built two successful SAFEGE lines, the Siemens Company of Germany has developed a smaller scale system similar to the SAFEGE Monorail. Aerorail of Texas and Sky Train of Florida were promoting steel-wheel versions of SAFEGE as well but both appear to have ceased trading without having installed a system. Japan would later adopt the ALWEG and SAFEGE monorail systems including the Shonan Monorail and build more transit monorails than any other country in the world.

In 1956 Monorail, Incorporated built a short test track of their suspended system at Arrowhead Park in Houston, Texas. The single 55 seat car was called "Trailblazer". Its promoters claimed it could reach speeds of 160 km but no installations were ever built. The system was unusual because the driver's position was on top of the bogies, not in the same cabin as the passengers. After eight months of testing, the track was dismantled and rebuilt at the Texas State fairgrounds where it ran until 1964

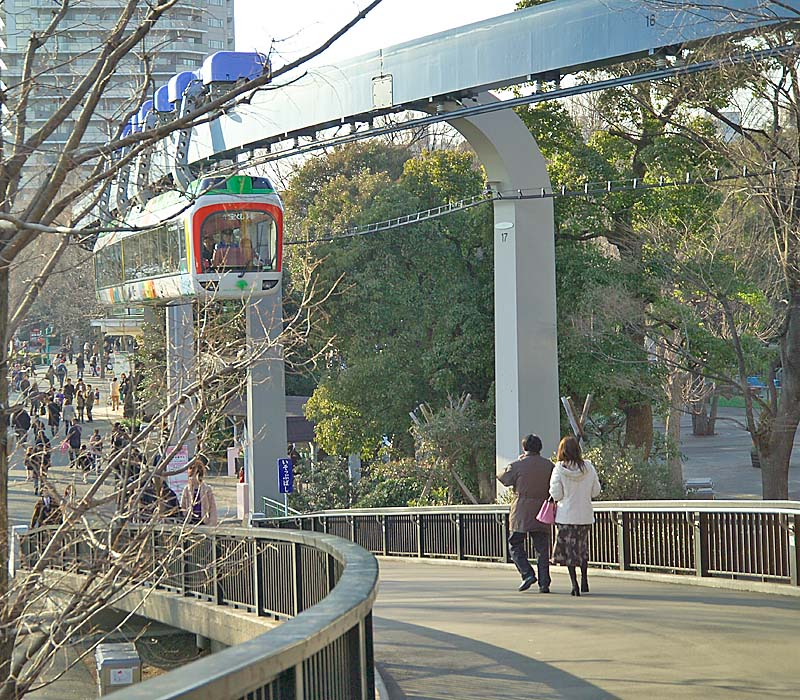
The Ueno Zoo Monorail

The Ueno Zoo Monorail is a 0.3 km (0.19 mi) long suspended monorail operated by the Tokyo Metropolitan Bureau of Transportation (Toei). It is similar to the Wuppertal Schwebebahn, but has rubber tires rather than steel wheels. The line began operating on 17 December 1958. After 60 years of operation service was suspended on 31 October 2019, with the operator citing the high costs of replacing the aging trains.

=== 1960s ===
In the 1960s in the United States a large number of suspended monorails systems were opened but none were for transit. These included 1962 at the LA County Fair (closed late 1990s), 1964–1965 at the New York World's Fair, in 1964 at Houston International Airport (closed 1966) and in 1966 at two Busch Gardens parks at Van Nuys in California (closed 1979), Tampa in Florida (closed 1999).

At the end of the decade, in 1969, a prototype test track of track of the Vero Monocab personal rapid transit was built in Texas. This design was sold to and developed by Rohr, Inc. as the ROMAG system with a new test track built in California.

=== 1970s and 1980s ===
Based on another new design using small capacity cars, the Jetrail system opened in 1970 at Dallas Love Field Airport taking passengers from a carpark to the terminal. It closed in 1974 when Braniff International Airways moved most of its operations to another airport.

Based on the SAFEGE design, the Shonan Monorail opened in 1970 in Kamakura, Japan—part of the Greater Tokyo area. It continues in operation today.

The Chiba Urban Monorail, also in Japan, is the world's largest suspension railway; it is owned and operated by Chiba Urban Monorail Co. Ltd, established in 1979, and the monorail began service in 1988.

Two further H-Bahn suspension railways were built in Germany in 1975, at Dortmund University campus and Düsseldorf airport. The Memphis Suspension Railway was opened in the United States in 1982.

=== 1990s and 2000s ===
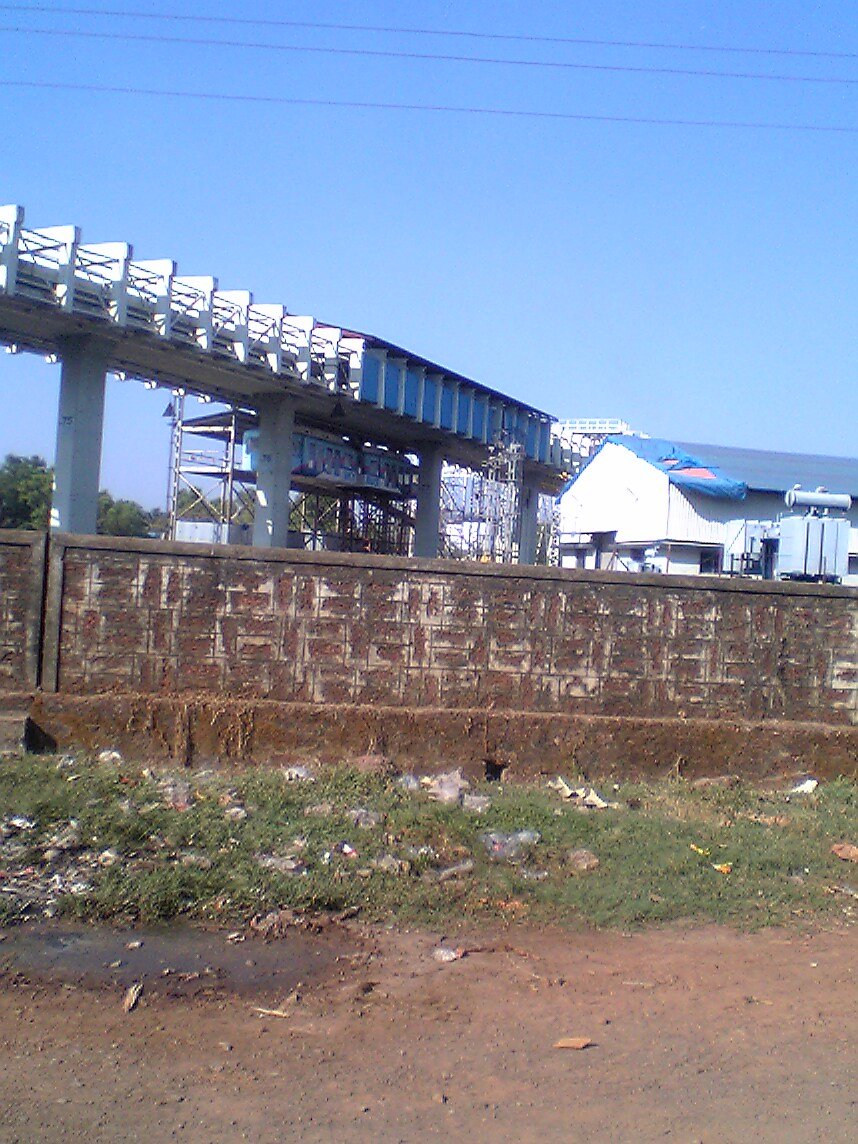
The Skybus Metro

The Skybus Metro was a prototype suspended railway in Goa, India. The system consisted of an elevated track with the cars suspended below the track, like the Wuppertal Schwebebahn or H-Bahn systems in Germany. A 1.6-kilometre (0.99 mi) test track in Margao, Goa started trials in 2004, but on 25 September, one employee was killed and three injured in an accident. No progress was made after the accident. In 2013, the metro was dismantled.

=== 2010s and 2020s ===
Four new SAFEGE style suspended railway prototypes, with test tracks and vehicles, have been developed since 2010. In China three have been created, by CRRC Qingdao Sifang in Qingdao, by China Railway Science and Industry Group in Wuhan and by Zhongtang Air Rail Technology in Chengdu. A SAFEGE based test line was also constructed in Glukhovo in the Krasnogorsk District, Russia in 2016. As of 2025 just one new system in Wuhan has been completed in 2023, another short one began construction in 2020 in Enshi City China. There are a number of other projects have been considered in both China and Russia.

== List of suspension railways ==
List of suspension railways
Name	Location	Country	Service	Started operations	Status	Technology	Track length
Schwebebahn	Wuppertal	Germany	Public	1901	Operating	Eugen Langen design	13.3 km (8.3 mi)
Schwebebahn	Dresden	Germany	Public	1901	Operating	Eugen Langen design	0.274 km (0.170 mi)
Ueno Zoo Monorail	Ueno Zoo, Taitō, Tokyo	Japan	Public	1957	Not in service since 2019; Officially closed in 2024, currently being dismantled	Eugen Langen design	0.3 km (0.19 mi)
Higashiyama Park Monorail	Higashiyama Zoo and Botanical Gardens, Chikusa-ku, Nagoya	Japan	Public	1964	Dismantled in 1975	SAFEGE	0.5 km (0.31 mi)
Shonan Monorail	Kanagawa Prefecture	Japan	Public	1970	Operating	SAFEGE	6.6 km (4.1 mi)
Jetrail	Dallas Love Field	United States	Public	1970	Not in service since 1974	Independent design	2.82km (1.75mi)
H-Bahn	TU Dortmund	Germany	Public	1984	Operating	SAFEGE-derivative; Siemens SIPEM	3.16 km (1.96 mi)
Memphis Suspension Railway	Mud Island, Memphis	United States	Public	1982	Not in service since 2018	Eugen Langen-derivative	1,700 feet (520 m)
Chiba Urban Monorail	Chiba	Japan	Public	1988	Operating	SAFEGE	15.2 km (9.4 mi)
Sky train	Düsseldorf Airport	Germany	Public	2002	Operating	SAFEGE-derivative; Siemens SIPEM	2.5 km (1.6 mi)
Skybus Metro	Margao, Goa	India	Public^{1}	Never	Dismantled in 2013	Rajaram/KRCL design	1.6 km (0.99 mi)
Strela Monorail	Glukhovo near Krasnogorsk	Russia	Test track	2016	Abandoned	SAFEGE-derivative, STRELA	0.9 km (0.56 mi)
SkyTrain	Chengdu	China	Test track	2021	Operating	SAFEGE-derivative; Zhongtang Air Rail Technology	1.2 km (0.75 mi)
Red Rail	Xingguo	China	Test track	2022	Operating	SAFEGE-derivative	0.8 km (0.50 mi)
Optics Valley Suspended Monorail	Wuhan	China	Public	2023	Operating	SAFEGE-derivative	10.5 km (6.5 mi)
Qingyunya Sightseeing Little Train Project	Xiajiaba near Enshi	China	Public	?	Under construction	SAFEGE-derivative	2.1 km (1.3 mi)

Note 1: Skybus Metro used the track as a test track, but it was planned to become part of the public line.

== Farm, mining and logistics applications ==
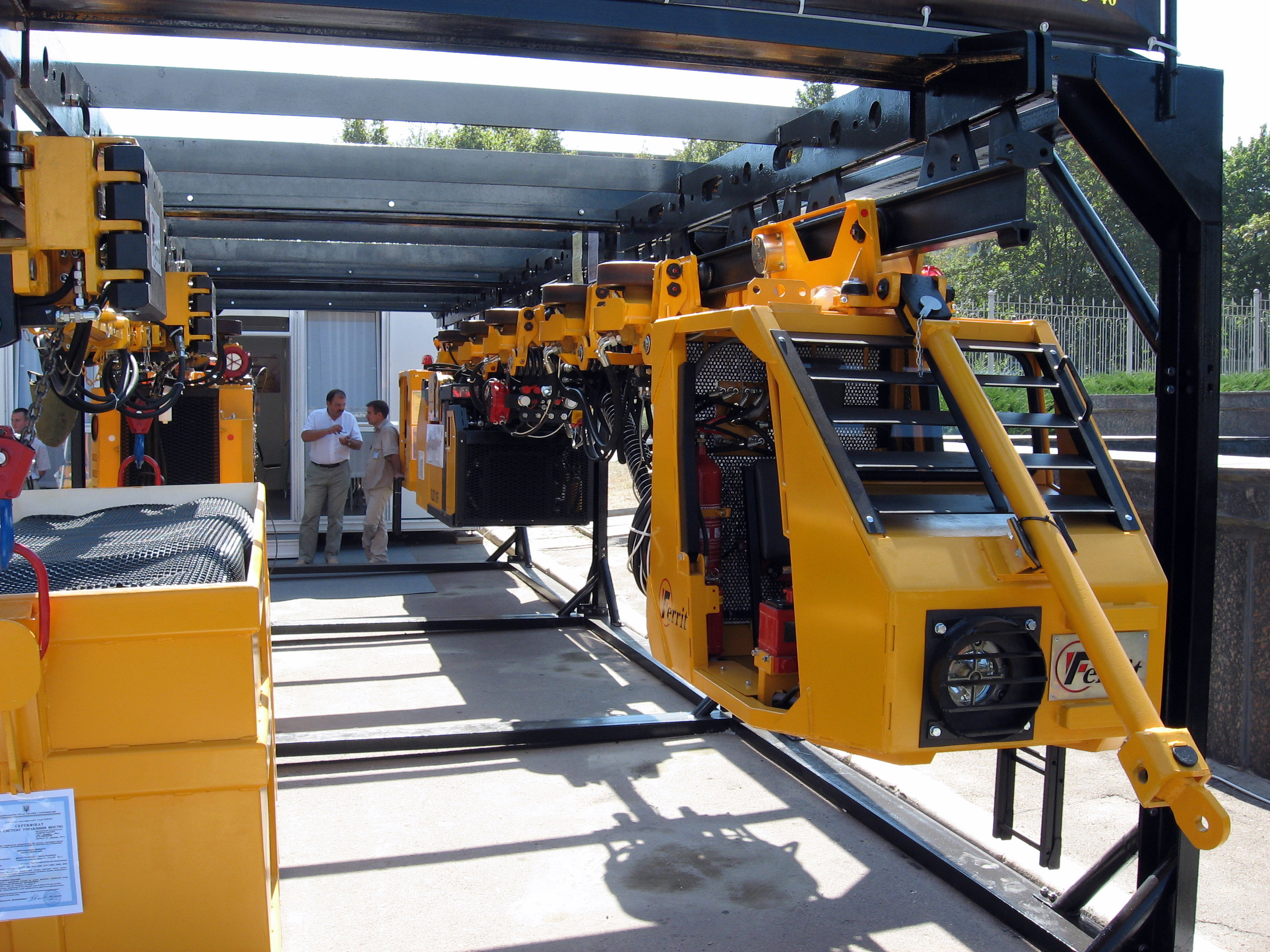
Mining monorail

Aside from a multitude of indoor uses in factories, suspended railways are also used for number of outdoor applications other than passenger transportation.

In the 1920s the Port of Hamburg used a petrol-powered, suspended monorail to transport luggage and freight from ocean-going vessels to a passenger depot.

Very small and lightweight systems have been used widely on farms to transport crops such as bananas.

In the mining industry suspended monorails have been used because they can descend and climb steep tunnels using rack and pinion drive. This significantly reduces cost and length of tunnels, by up to 60% in some cases; they otherwise must be at gentle gradients to suit road vehicles or conventional railways.

A suspended monorail capable of carrying fully loaded 20 foot (6m) and 40 foot (12m) containers has been under construction since 2020 at the Port of Qingdao, the first phase of which was put into operation in 2021.

== See also ==
- Automated guideway transit
- Suspended roller coaster, examples of similar technology used in amusement rides
- Shweeb, a pedal powered, suspended monorail, Personal Rapid Transit system
- WireRoad/tarbato a pedal powered suspended monorail developed in Nepal in 2004
