= H-Bahn =

Suspended, driverless passenger railway system developed in Germany

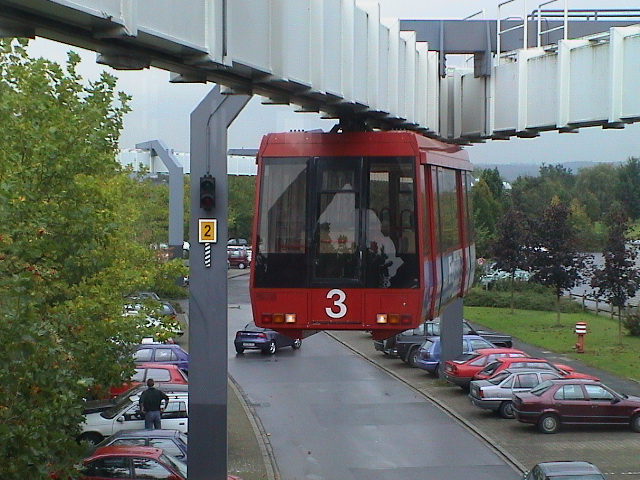
Dortmund H-Bahn

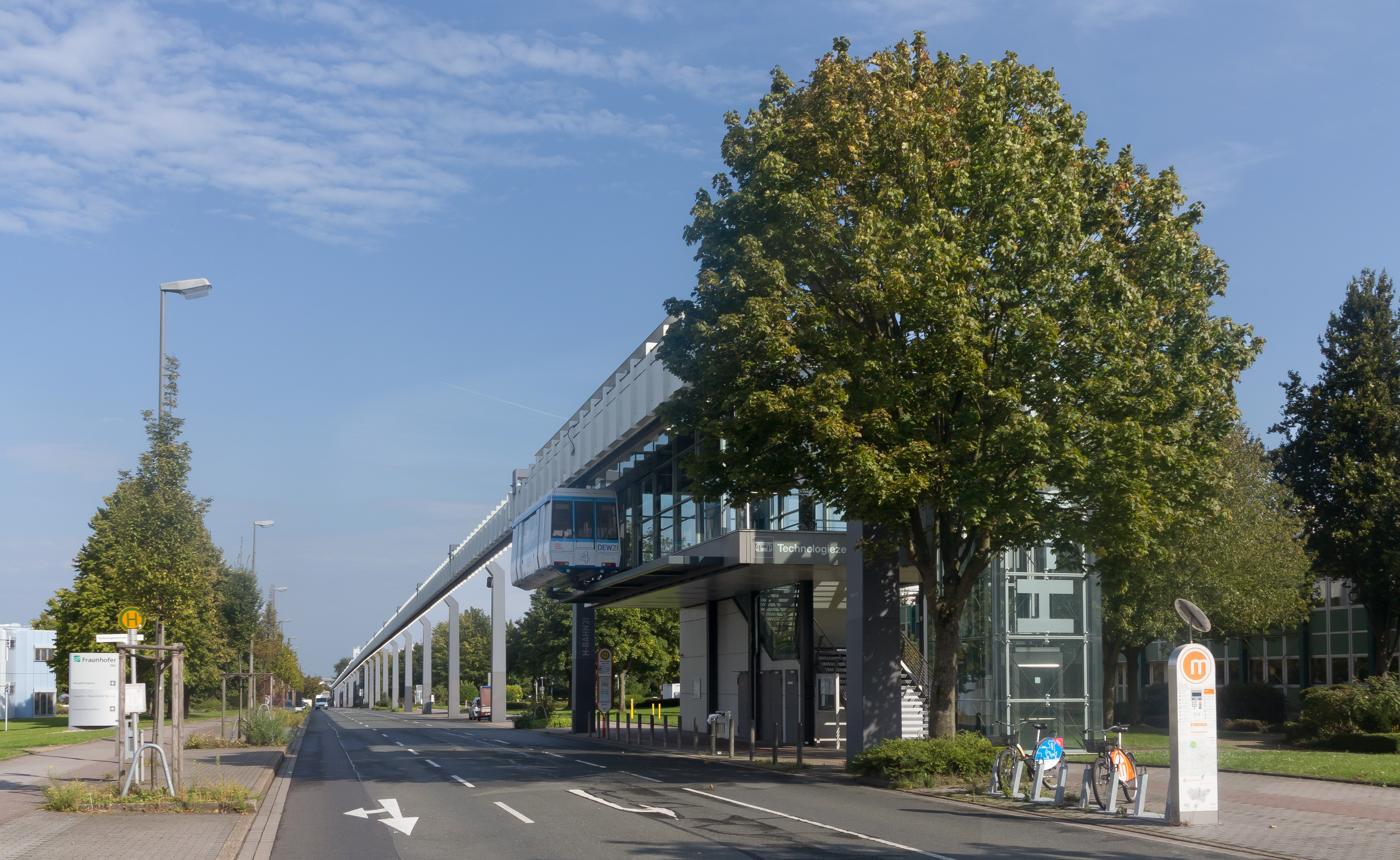
Dortmund H-Bahn, Technologiezentrum station

Düsseldorf Airport H-Bahn in 2015

The H-Bahn (abbreviation for Hängebahn, German for 'hanging railway') in Dortmund and Düsseldorf (there known as "Sky train") is a driverless passenger suspension railway system. The system was developed by Siemens, who call the project SIPEM (SIemens PEople Mover).

Two installations exist, one at the Dortmund university campus, the other at the Düsseldorf Airport. While Siemens is no longer actively marketing the system, and will no longer carry out turnkey projects, new installations are still possible in collaboration with the Dortmund operating company.

Since 2011 Air Train International has been marketing the system in China and as of May 2013 there are proposals to build lines in Shanghai and Wenzhou. A number of other Chinese cities are also studying the system.

== Technical description ==
The cabins are centrally controlled and do not need a driver. The system can operate on a schedule or on-demand, whereby a passenger requests a carriage by pushing a button, similar to summoning an elevator. The maximum speed is 50 km/h (31 mph). The system allows forking by a system of switches in the carrier.

=== Suspension and propulsion ===
The carrier is a hollow rectangular box girder with a slit in the bottom through which the cabin is suspended at the running gear, whose two axles carry the load with a rubber wheel on both sides providing both suspension and propulsion. Two wheels run horizontally along the top and bottom of the interior side walls of the carrier box, providing horizontal guidance. Thus, the designation as a monorail system is to be taken with a grain of salt, meaning just that there is a single axis of suspension.

400-volt three-phase current is taken from four conductors at the side wall. Above those, a cable provides continuous wireless data connection between the train and the control center.

All contact between the suspended cabin and the fixed system is enclosed in the interior of the carrier box, protected from the elements. In this sense, the SIPEM suspension system is similar to the one used by the earlier SAFEGE system (which was developed in France and is used on two networks in Japan), but is much narrower, both the carrier box as well as the open slit for the suspension.

The cabin is suspended below two motorized bogies, which are enclosed in the carrier girder. Each bogie is equipped with two 31 kW (42 hp) electric motors.

Each running gear is equipped with two motors, which are connected in parallel via their armature circuits (4-pole separately-excited DC machine with contraflexure poles).

=== Specifications ===
Operating voltage	3 × 400 V, 50 Hz
Nominal power of motors	4 × 31.5 kW (42.2 hp)
Peak motive power	124 kW (166 hp)
Range of revolutions per minute	0–3,290 rpm
Nominal torque	90 N⋅m (66 lbf⋅ft)
Nominal propulsive force	8.4 kN (1,900 lb_{f})
Maximum propulsive force	16.8 kN (3,800 lb_{f})
Regular acceleration	1 m/s^{2} (3.3 ft/s^{2})
Regular deceleration	1 m/s^{2} (3.3 ft/s^{2})
Emergency deceleration	>1.5 m/s^{2} (4.9 ft/s^{2})
Top speed	13.9 m/s (50 km/h; 31 mph)
Positioning accuracy	± 3 cm (1.2 in)
Noise level	< 65 dB/A at top speed, 25 m (82 ft) away

=== Cabin ===
Each cabin is 8.232 m (27 ft 1/8 in) long (9.20 m (30 ft 2 3/16 in), including couplers), 2.244 m (7 ft 4 3/8 in) wide and 2.623 m (8 ft 7 1/4 in) high. The interior height for standing passengers is 2.003 m (6 ft 6 7/8 in). It has two 1.350 m (4 ft 5 1/8 in) wide automatic sliding doors at each side. The Dortmund cabin provides seating for 16 and standing room for 29 passengers, while the Düsseldorf airport version provides space for 15 and 32, respectively.

The cabin shell weighs 4,955 kg (10,924 lb). The complete car weighs 8,455 kg (18,640 lb), with bogies weighing 1,750 kg (3,860 lb) each. It can carry a working load of up to 4,923 kg (10,853 lb) and has a maximum gross weight of 13,378 kg (29,493 lb).

=== Switching ===
Switching is done with the help of the horizontal guiding wheels, where short blades on both sides of the common section of the carrier move as a channel of the same width as the carrying box to the left or right, while a long blade between the two forking guideways moves right or left to provide the horizontal guidance into the intended direction.

== History ==
In 1973, the Federal Ministry made DM 22 million (€11,250,000) available for the research and promotion of this system. A test line was opened on 21 July 1975 in Düsseldorf by the former transport minister Hans Matthoefer with a length of 180 metres (approx. 200 yards). In 1976, the system was extended by 1.5 km (0.93 miles).

=== Dortmund ===
The first publicly funded overhead railway has run since 1984 at the University of Dortmund, where it initially just connected the north and south campuses with a single line. However, many stations have 2 platforms with a track either side permitting carriages to pass each other in opposite directions. This stretch was opened on 2 May 1984 by Dr. Heinz Riesenhuber, and comprised 1.05 kilometres (0.65 mi) of track and two trains. The cost was approximately DM 24,000,000 (€12,270,000), of which 75% was funded by the German Federal Government, 20% by the state of North Rhine-Westphalia and 5% by the city of Dortmund.

The longest span between support pillars is 38.5 metres (126.3 ft), where it crosses the university road, which bisects the two campuses. Just beyond the road the H-Bahn crosses through a nature reserve at its maximum elevation of about 16 metres (approx. 50 feet) above ground. In order to prevent passengers getting close to the track at stations, there are platform edge doors between the platform and the track. As soon as the vehicles arrive in the station, doors in the partition open automatically, along with the train car doors.

In 1993, following a three-year construction period, a new 900 m (0.56 miles) long branch was opened, along with two new stations, one in Eichlinghofen and another at the S-Bahn station at Dortmund university. This construction included technology considered to be the first of its kind in Germany. The existing system was renovated, and equipped with technology which allowed determining the train's location with a much higher precision — within 3 cm (1.2 in). These changes allowed for a higher speed, and trains can now also follow each other more closely. Three new carriages were supplied by Siemens. An extension into the nearby technology park was opened on 19 December 2003, which means the current network, including this final 1.2 km (0.75 mi) extension, has a length of 3.162 km (approx. 2 miles). The building of this section cost around €15,500,000.

Line 1 operates between the Technology Park and Eichlinghofen, and during the day carriages arrive every ten minutes, stopping at the university and the S-Bahn stop, where there is a connection every twenty minutes to Dortmund city centre, and Bochum. Two trains serve line 1.

Line 2 is the original line between the North and South campuses of the university, and is served by a third train. A reserve fourth vehicle is available, and there is also a maintenance vehicle.

Further extensions to the H-Bahn network were being considered, but were not cost-effective enough:

- Between the university and the central bus and train station of Dortmund.
- Eastward from the university, as far as to the Märkische Strasse, southeast of downtown Dortmund.

=== Düsseldorf Airport ===
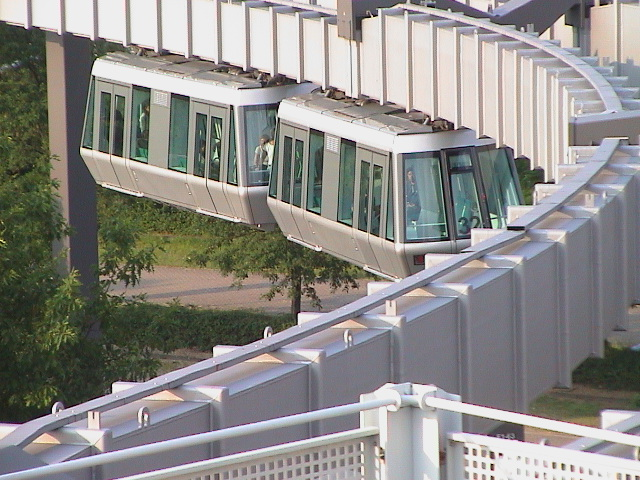
Skytrain Düsseldorf Airport

A nearly identical monorail system called SkyTrain transfers passengers at Düsseldorf Airport, which opened on 1 July 2002 after almost six years of construction. The system links Terminal C and Terminal A+B with the long-term parking facility and the long-distance train station along a twin line. The trip between the four stops takes approximately 6 minutes and 30 seconds.

== See also ==
- Wuppertal Schwebebahn
- Skybus Metro
