= Memphis Suspension Railway =

Suspended monorail in Memphis, Tennessee, US

Coordinates: 35.150319°N 90.055854°W

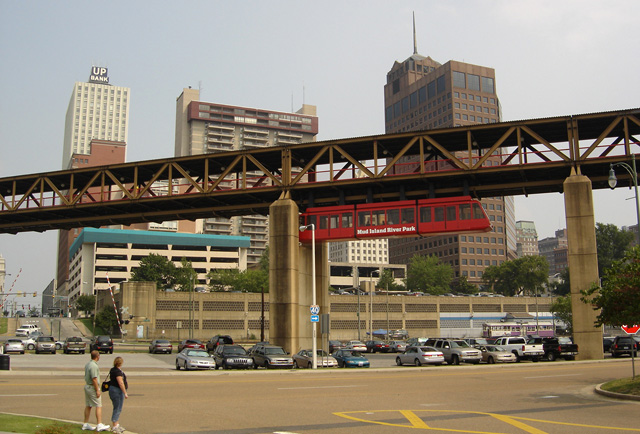

Overview
- Locale: Memphis, Tennessee, U.S.
- Transit type: Suspension railway
- Number of lines: 1
- Number of stations: 2

Operation
- Began operation: 1982
- Ended operation: 2018
- Operator: Memphis River Parks Partnership

Technical
- System length: 1,700 ft (518 m)
- Average speed: 7 mph (11 km/h)

The Memphis Suspension Railway, Mud Island Monorail, or Memphis Monorail is a suspended monorail that connected the city center of Memphis with the entertainment park on Mud Island. Celebrating its grand opening on July 3, 1982, it is located beneath a footbridge over Wolf River Harbor connecting to the southern tip of Mud Island. In 2018, multiple malfunctions occurred during passenger service, one of which required the fire department to attend to stranded passengers, and finally the motor failed.

== History ==
The line had two suspended cars constructed in Switzerland, delivered in summer 1981. The 1,700-foot-long (518 m) footbridge opened to pedestrians on June 29, 1981; but the monorail was not operational until July 1982. The cars were driven by a 3,500-foot-long (1,067 m) external cable, instead of by internal motors. The two cars simultaneously shuttled back and forth on parallel tracks between the Front Street Terminal on the downtown side and the Mud Island Terminal. Each car had a maximum capacity of 180 passengers and travelled at 7 mph (11.3 km/h).

At the time of its construction, the U.S. Coast Guard stated that the proposed bridge would have to have the same clearance as the Hernando de Soto Bridge, as it was spanning a commercially used public waterway. This resulted in the bridge being constructed at its current elevation.

Due to its unique nature, only one person, "Paul Jordan, the engineer who built it, was the lone man who could fix it. Over the decades, he’d fly to Memphis, often in his own plane, land in the Wolf River Harbor, pull right up to the boat ramp at the park and stay a few days to make repairs."

The monorail closed indefinitely on July 6, 2018, and opened occasionally for special events. An inspection of the monorail by Schwager Davis in 2021, found the "system was not able to be powered up" so it had to be "evaluated by visual inspection." As of 2022, the monorail is inoperable.

== Incidents ==
On June 19, 1994, a 19-year-old female Memphis State University student, Shellie McKnight, fell while cleaning the exterior windows of one of the cars and died. The 26 ft (7.9 m) fatal fall was ruled accidental by Memphis Police. Her family lost the lawsuit they filed against the City of Memphis.

On September 29, 2018, six passengers were trapped in one of the cars when it stalled mid-transit. The stall was caused by a fuse that was tripped. About 20 minutes after the vehicle initially stalled, the driver evacuated the vehicle onto the pedestrian bridge above. Nobody involved was injured.

== In popular culture ==
In the 1993 film The Firm, Mitch McDeere, played by Tom Cruise, uses the railway to escape from a hitman sent by his employer to kill him.

== See also ==
- List of monorail systems
