= GTW 72 =

Suspension railway train type formerly operated in Wuppertal, Germany

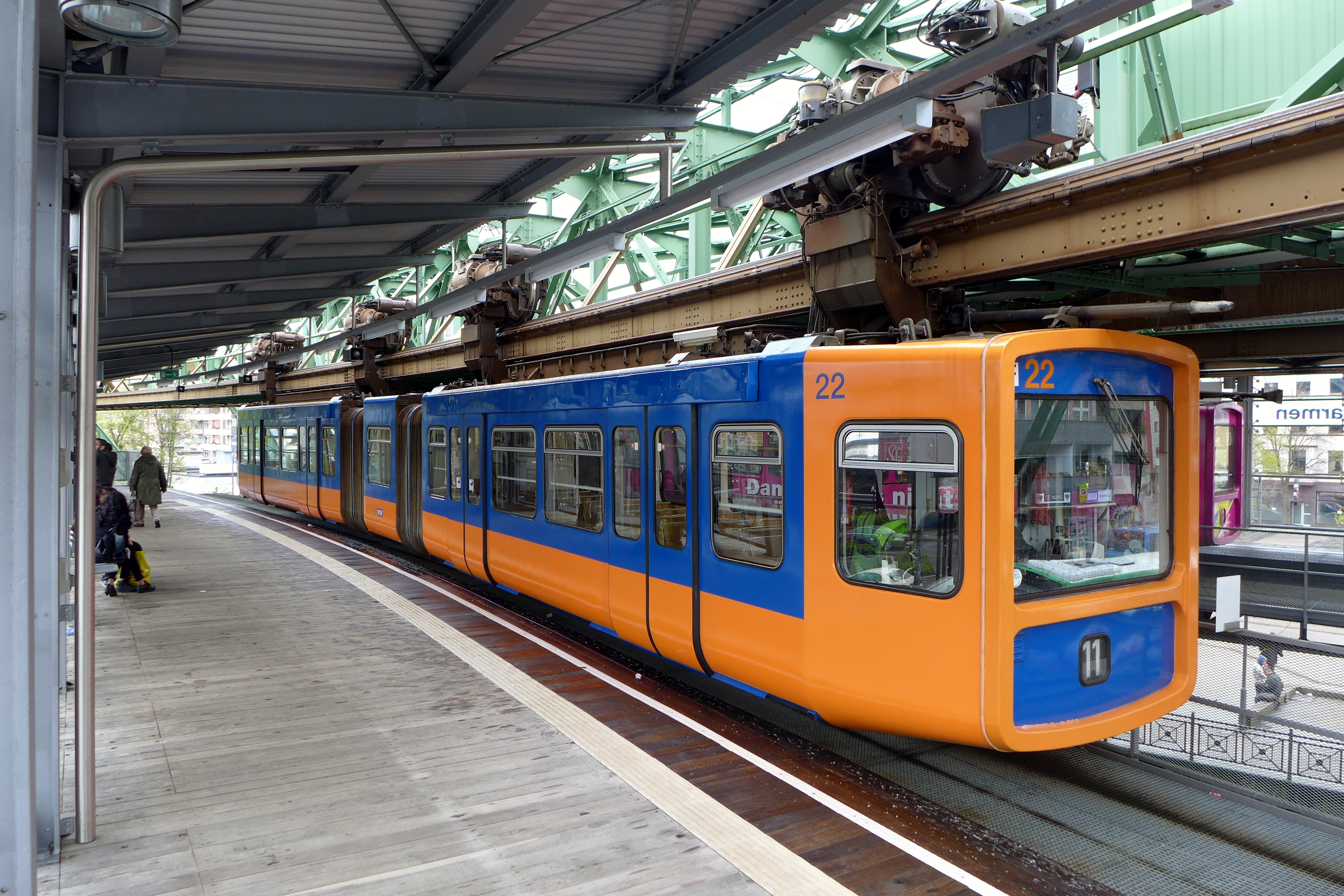
- Set 22 at Oberbarmen Schwebebahn station in April 2016
- In service: 1972–2018
- Manufacturer: MAN
- Designer: Klaus Flesche
- Constructed: 1972–1975
- Number built: 28 sets
- Number in service: None
- Successor: GTW 15
- Formation: 3 sections per trainset
- Fleet numbers: 1–28
- Capacity: 48 seated, 156 standing
- Operators: Wuppertaler Stadtwerke (WSW)

Specifications
- Car body construction: Aluminium
- Train length: 24,060 mm (78 ft 11 in)
- Width: 2,200 mm (7 ft 3 in)
- Doors: 4 pairs on the right side (in direction of travel)
- Maximum speed: 60 km/h (35 mph)
- Weight: 35,5 t
- Traction system: Chopper-controlled DC motors
- Power output: 4 x 50 kW
- Electric system(s): 600 V DC
- Track gauge: Single track (monorail)

The GTW 72 (GTW = "Gelenktriebwagen" or articulated railcar) is a suspended monorail train type operated by Wuppertaler Stadtwerke on the Wuppertal Schwebebahn from 1972 until 2018.

== Technical specifications ==
Each set consists of three sections. The trains have welded aluminium car bodies, and are powered by four chopper-controlled motors, which power the two wheels of each bogie.

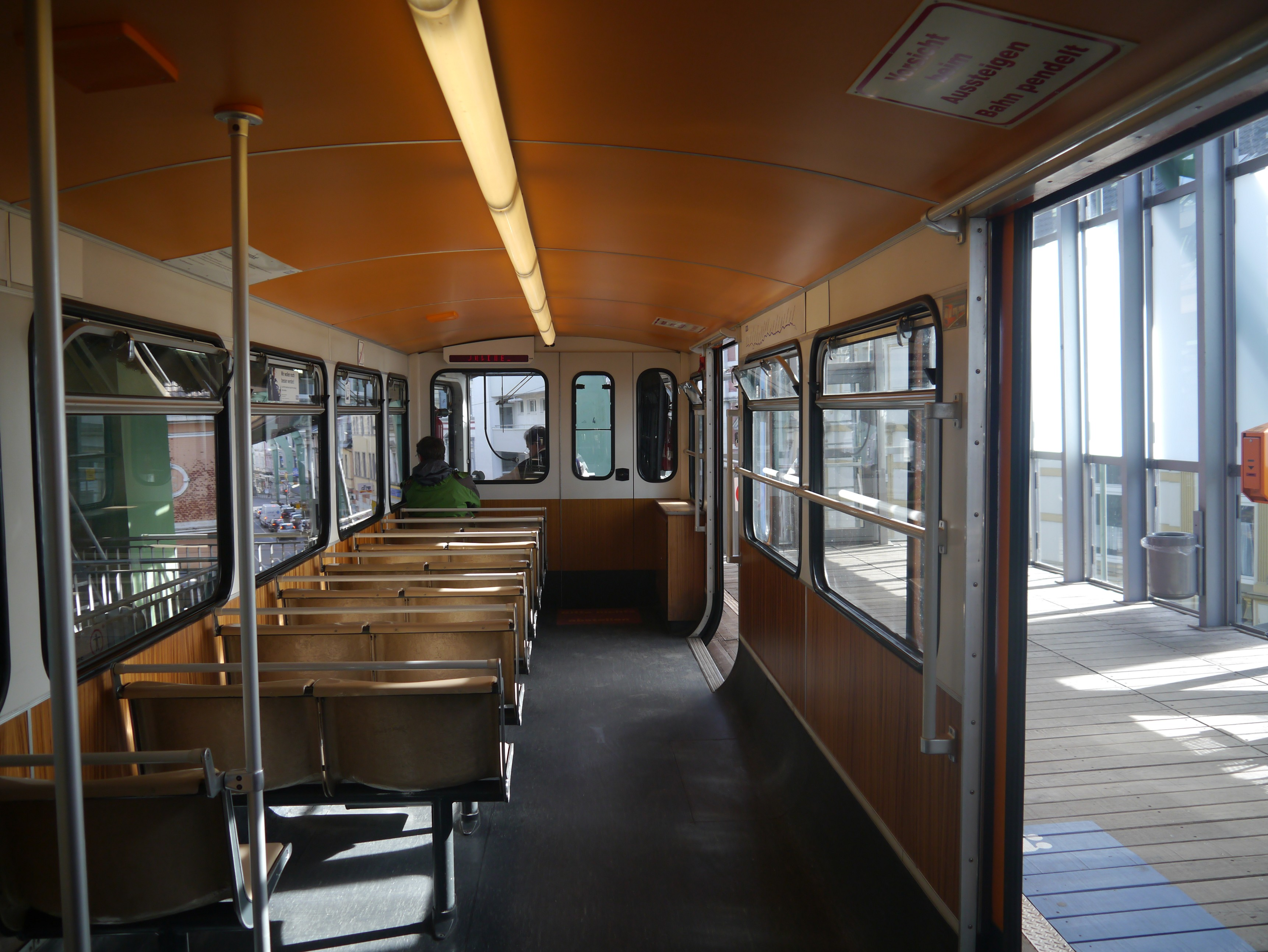
Interior view

=== Interior ===
Seating accommodation consists of transverse seating.

== History ==
The GTW 72 was designed by German architect Klaus Flesche. A total of 28 sets were built by MAN between 1972 and 1975. One unit derailed in the 1999 Wuppertal Suspension Railway accident.

Regular operations ended in November 2018 with the suspension of Schwebebahn services following problems with the power supply. The last set was removed from the tracks on July 11, 2019. After their withdrawal from service, 21 units were sold, and three were donated under the condition that they stay within Wuppertal. Set 15 remains with Wuppertaler Stadtwerke. Set 6 was scrapped in early 2019.

== Preserved examples ==
- Set 2: preserved on the premises of Lang AG in Lindlar
- Set 8: preserved at Kinder-Tisch Vohwinkel e.V. in Wuppertal
- Set 15: in storage by Wuppertaler Stadtwerke
- Set 27: sold in November 2019; to be preserved in Plettenberg
