= International Police Association =

Non-Governmental Organisation of police and ex-police

- Abbreviation: IPA
- Formation: 1950; 76 years ago
- Founder: Arthur Troop
- Type: Non-Governmental Organization
- Legal status: Friendship Organization
- Headquarters: Nottingham, UK
- Members: 372,000
- Official language: English, French, German, Spanish
- International President: Martin Hoffmann
- Website: www.ipa-international.org

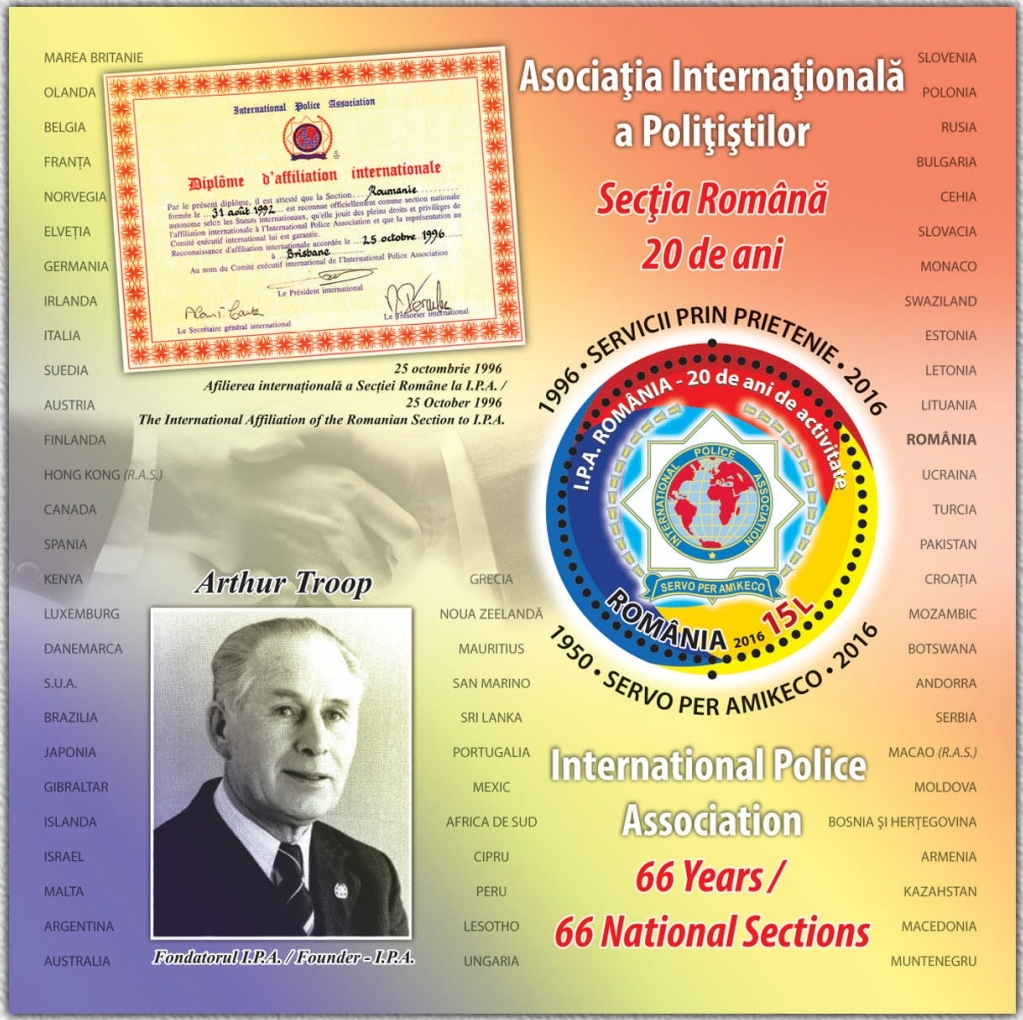
A 2016 stamp sheet of Romania dedicated to the 66th anniversary of IPA and to Arthur Troop

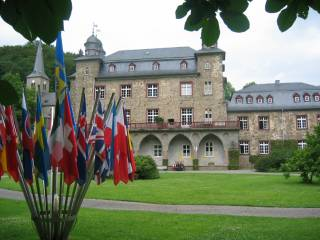
Gimborn Castle in Germany, Educational Centre

The International Police Association (IPA) is a worldwide fraternal police organization. The IPA operates as a Non-Governmental Organization open to active duty or retired members of the police force.

== Mission ==
The IPA was founded in an effort to connect past and current members of law enforcement "without distinction as to rank, position, gender, race, language or religion" across cultures.

According to its website, the organization "aims are to create and strengthen bonds of friendship between members of the police service, promote international cooperation in social, cultural and professional fields, encourage peaceful co-existence between peoples and preservation of world peace, improve the public image of the police service and enhance recognition of the IPA by international bodies."

== History ==
=== Founding ===
The IPA was founded by Lincolnshire Police officer Arthur Troop in 1950. In 1949, Troop wrote an article published in the British Police Review under the pseudonym of Aytee. By January 1, 1950, the IPA was established with the Esperanto motto "Servo per Amikeco," or "Service Through Friendship." Troop became the first secretary general of the British section of the organization and later the first international secretary general. In 1966, he resigned from that role for unspecified personal reasons.

Troop and other organization leaders sought to expand to as many countries as possible. Within the course of several years, there were sections in the majority of Western Europe.

=== Expansion outside of Europe ===
On March 16, 1961 at the IPA's organization-wide formal summit called the World Congress, the first sections outside of Europe were affiliated in Canada and Hong Kong. At the third World Congress held in Stuttgart, Germany, in September 1961, the first African IPA section was also affiliated in Kenya.

=== First female leader ===
In 1982, Phyllis Nolan of Ireland was elected to become the first woman to serve on the IPA's executive board. She later became president of Section Ireland and international vice president.

=== International Administration Centre formed ===
In 1986, due to the growth of the organization, the leadership decided to hire a full-time staff. Until that point, administrative duties shifted from section to section. In 1987, a permanent centre was established by Ken Robinson, the first Chief Executive Officer, previously working in a voluntary capacity for many years, in the United Kingdom at the Nottingham headquarters building of Section UK.

By 2023, there were more than 372,000 members in nearly 100 countries, of which 65 are affiliated National Sections.

== Structure ==
The IPA adheres to the principles in the Universal Declaration of Human Rights as adopted by the United Nations in 1948, and is in Consultative (Special) Status with the Economic and Social Council of the United Nations, and also is in Consultative Status with the Organization of American States and UNESCO.

=== International Executive Board ===
The International Executive Board (IEB) is responsible for the day-to-day management of the IPA. It's made up of eight IPA members who are elected by the membership at the World Congress and they serve for a 4-year term.

Board Members
| Title | Name |
|---|---|
| International President | Martin Hoffmann (Austria) |
| Vice President | Michael Walsh (Ireland) |
| Secretary General | Joze Senica (Slovenia) |
| Chairperson International Relations Commission | Oliver Hoffmann (Germany) |
| Chairperson Socio-Cultural Commission | Christos Parginos (Greece) |
| Chairperson Professional Commission | Diego Trolese (Italy) |
| Head of Administration | Clive Wood (United Kingdom) |
| Treasurer Finances | Michael Walsh (Ireland) |
| Treasurer Social Affairs | Jean-Pierre Allet (Switzerland) |

=== Commissions ===
There are three commissions that report to the executive board:

- International Relations Commission: responsible for maintaining connections across different chapters and cultures
- Professional Commission: responsible for professional development, youth outreach, equal opportunities
- Socio-Cultural Commission: responsible for the development and promotion of social and cultural activities within the organization

== Outreach ==
=== Young Police Officers' Seminar (YPOS) ===
The Young Police Officers' Seminar is a training event for young IPA members from Law Enforcement Agencies, held every second year. Destinations have included New Zealand (2023), Sri Lanka (2022), the UK (2019), USA (2017), Poland (2015) and Australia (2013).

=== Arthur Troop Scholarships (ATS) ===
The ATS is awarded annually to 10 – 15 IPA members for professional education and advanced training, with the aim of aiding IPA members in their professional development in memory of the founder of the IPA. The ATS may be awarded to any IPA member active in a law enforcement role, but is predominantly targeted at our younger members.

=== International Learning and Development Exchange Program ===
The International Learning and Development Exchange Program (ILDEP) relates to an international exchange of IPA members pertaining to their professional working role and is placed under the responsibility of the Chairperson of the PC. The exchange has a focus on sharing knowledge, an exchange of ideas, practices, and policy.

=== International Education and Information Center ===
Gimborn Castle, in Germany, houses the IPA's International Education and Conference Center, and is widely referred to as the Flagship of the Association. It is here where professional seminars, conferences and meetings are held in idyllic wooded mountainous surroundings, some 30 miles east of Cologne in the German State of North Rhine-Westphalia. IBZ Gimborn was founded on 25 October 1969 by a group led by Günter Kratz, Hans Jansen and Theo Leenders. They seized the opportunity to rent the castle from Baron von Fürstenberg. Conversion work was started on the main building and the defunct local primary school. Seminars initially were held in nearby Dürhölzen.

=== Travel Assistance ===
IPA Sections frequently arrange friendship weeks for members and their families to promote the culture and traditions of their countries, thus facilitating cross-border understanding. Many members participate in these events, while others travel on their own, with help from the sections they visit.

== IPA Houses ==
Many sections offer IPA members accommodation options: More than 40 IPA Houses are available, offering reasonably priced accommodation, plus the IPA has many other accommodation options available, including members’ holiday homes and discounts at hotels. IPA Houses and other accommodations are advertised in the IPA Hosting Book, with at present 264 hosting options.

== International Sports Events ==
Sports events and championships are arranged worldwide with numerous IPA members participating. The IPA Games is the latest contribution and is organized biennially. IPA Portugal hosted the IPA Games 2018. In 2022, Montenegro hosted the games.

== World Congress ==
The World Congress is an organization-wide summit to review the prior year and establish goals for the year ahead. It is hosted by a different national section every day, using lasting about a week.

The event has been held since the organization's founding. The World Congress has now been hosted in more than 31 countries in 65 years. In October 2023, the event was slated to be held in Athens, Greece.

== See also ==
- International Association of Women Police
- Fraternal Order of Police
