= GTW Generation 15 =

Suspension railway train type operated in Wuppertal, Germany

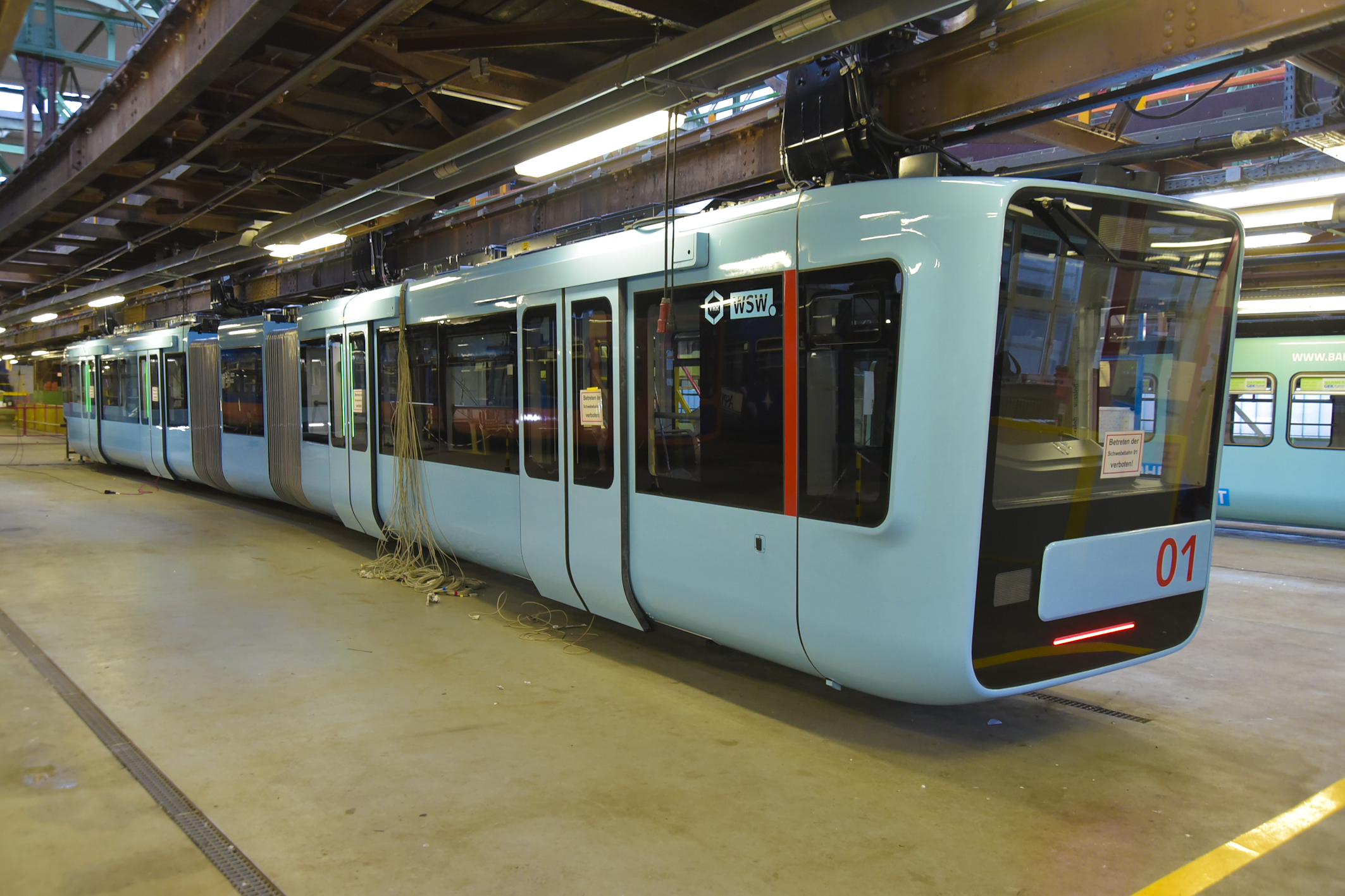
- Set 1 at Vohwinkel depot in January 2016
- In service: 2016–present
- Manufacturer: Vossloh
- Designer: büro+staubach
- Built at: Valencia, Spain
- Replaced: GTW 72
- Constructed: 2015–2017
- Number built: 31
- Formation: 3 sections per vehicle
- Capacity: 45 seated, 86 standing
- Operator: Wuppertaler Stadtwerke (WSW)

Specifications
- Car body construction: Welded aluminium
- Train length: 24.06 m (78 ft 11 in)
- Width: 2.3 m (7 ft 7 in)
- Height: 2.2 m (7 ft 3 in)
- Doors: 4 pairs on a single side
- Maximum speed: 60 km/h (37 mph)
- Weight: 23.4 t (23.0 long tons; 25.8 short tons)
- Traction system: Kiepe Electric IGBT–VVVF
- Traction motors: 4 × Traktionssysteme Austria TID 31-34-4 75 kW (101 hp)
- Power output: 300 kW (400 hp)
- Acceleration: 1.3 m/s^{2} (4.3 ft/s^{2})
- Deceleration: 1.3 m/s^{2} (4.3 ft/s^{2})
- Electric systems: 750 V DC
- Current collection: Contact shoe
- UIC classification: B′B′+0′+B′B′
- Safety system: Alstom Atlas 400 ETCS Level 2+

The GTW Generation 15 (GTW = "Gelenktriebwagen" or articulated railcar) is a suspended monorail train type operated by Wuppertaler Stadtwerke on the Wuppertal Schwebebahn since 2016.

== Technical specifications ==
Each set consists of three sections. The trains have a length of 24.06 m (78 ft 11 in), are 2.2 m (7 ft 3 in) wide, and are powered by four asynchronous motors. The car bodies are made of welded aluminium.

== Interior ==
The trains have a capacity of 45 seated and 86 standing passengers, and are equipped with a wheelchair ramp and air conditioning.

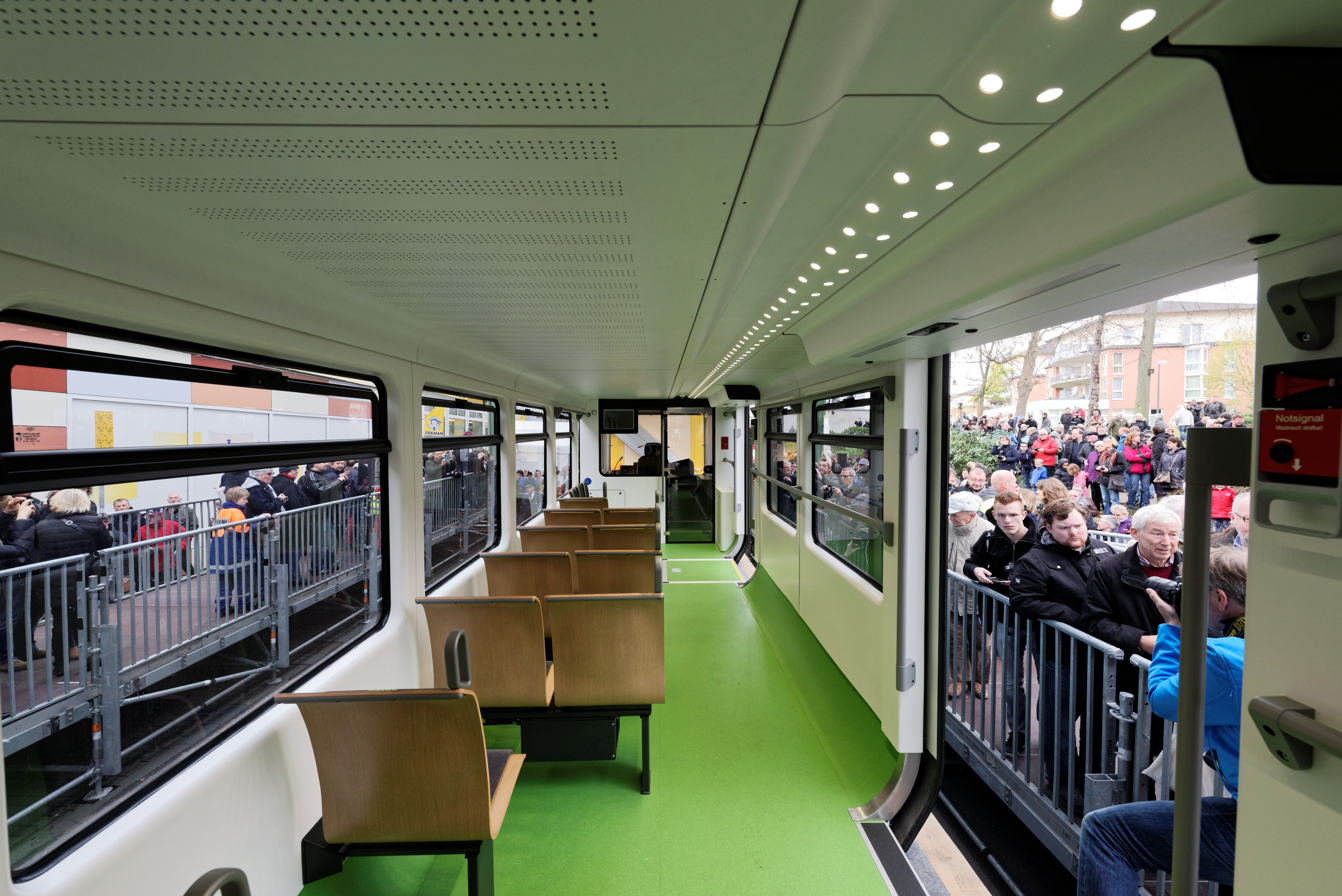
Interior

== History ==
31 sets were ordered in November 2011. The first set was unveiled in Wuppertal on 14 November 2016. On 18 December 2016, the first five trains entered service.

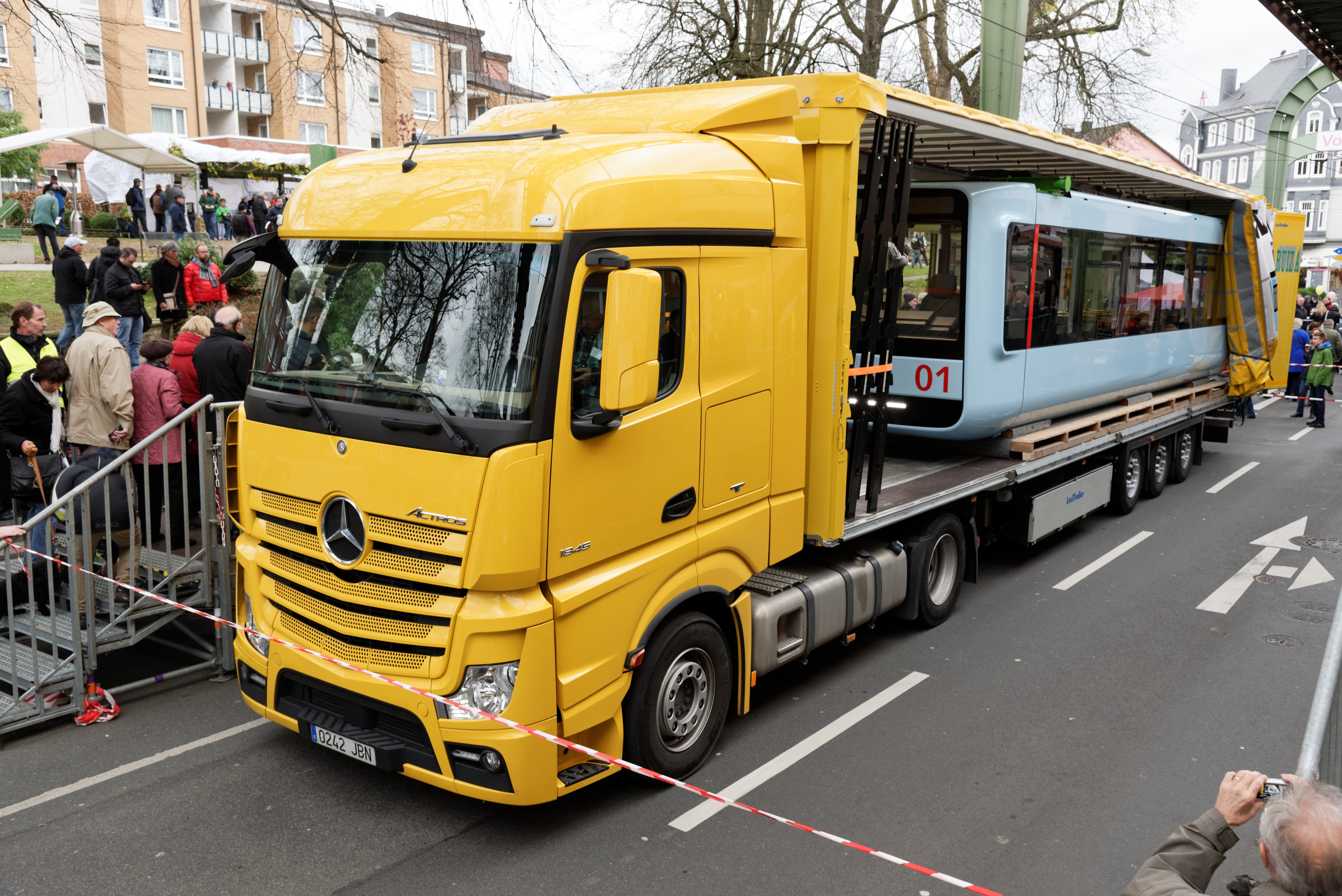
The first set on delivery
