= Gimborn Castle =

- Schloss Gimborn
- Near Gimborn Marienheide, Oberbergischer Kreis, North Rhine-Westphalia, Germany
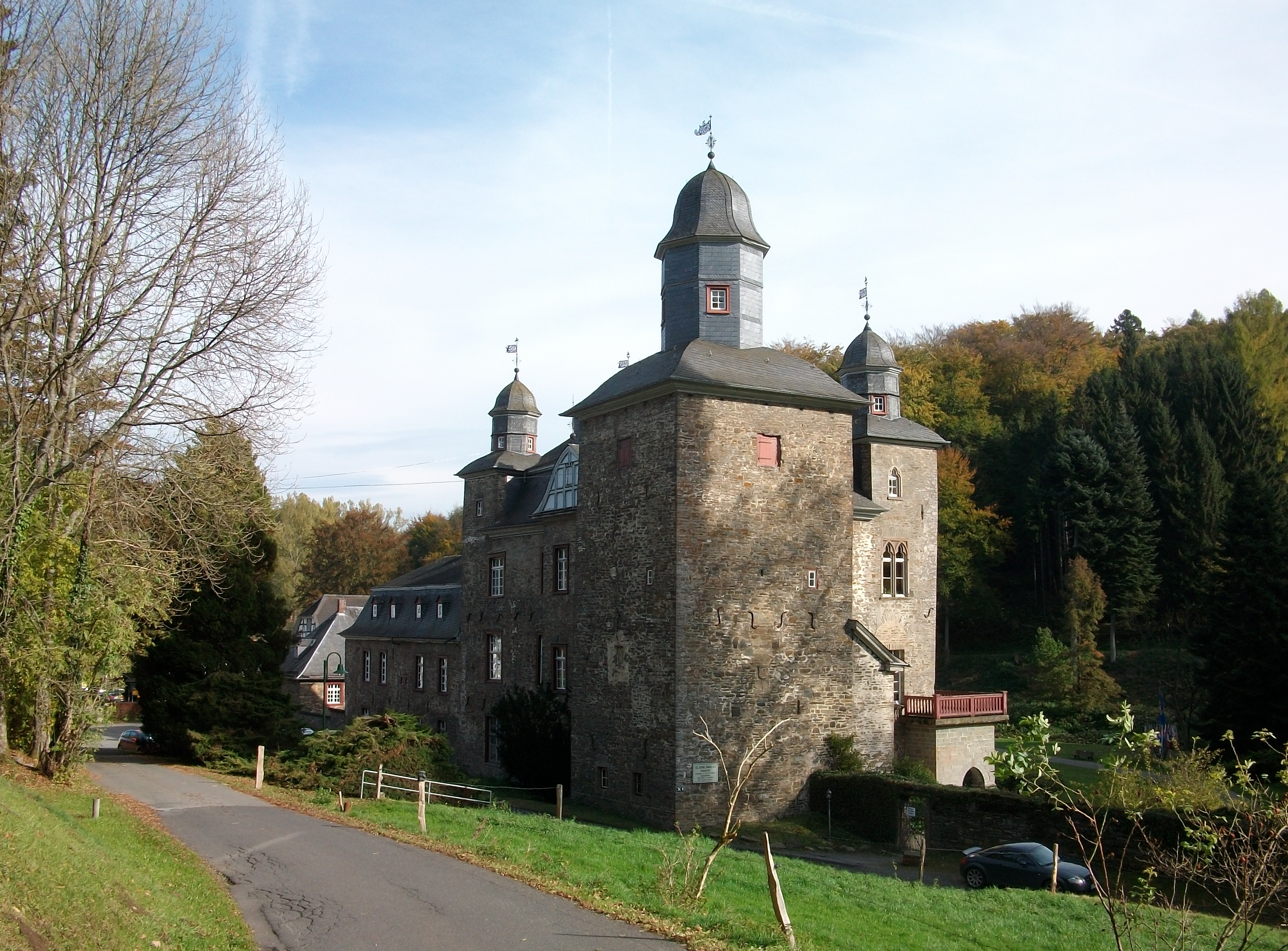
- Gimborn Castle

Site information
- Owner: Baron von Fürstenberg zu Gimborn
- Controlled by: International Police Association
- Open to the public: No
- Condition: Fully preserved

Location
- Coordinates: 51.061°N 7.476°E
- Height: 278 m

Site history
- Built: 1273
- Built by: Duke of Berg
- In use: Yes
- Materials: Quarrystone

Gimborn Castle (German: Schloss Gimborn) is a former moated castle situated in a remote valley of the upper Leppe in the municipality of Marienheide in the Oberbergischer Kreis of North Rhine-Westphalia, Germany.

== History ==
Gimborn Castle is a castle in the Gimborn district of the municipality of Marienheide in Oberbergischer Kreis in the state of North Rhine-Westphalia, Germany. Districts neighbouring on Gimborn are Boinghausen in the north, Jedinghausen in the east, Erlinghagen in the south, and Unterlichtinghagen in the west.

This former water castle lies in the upper Leppe valley. It was pledged in 1273 from the county of Berg to the county of Mark, and became the Residenz in the county of Gimborn Neustadt of the House of Schwarzenberg in 1631. Since 1874 the castle has belonged to the Barons von Fürstenberg zu Gimborn.

Since 1969 the Castle has served as a conference site and meeting place for the International Police Association. Once a year, the Castle opens its gates to the Schützenfest of the Gimborn Saint Sebastianus Schützenverein.

== Pictures ==
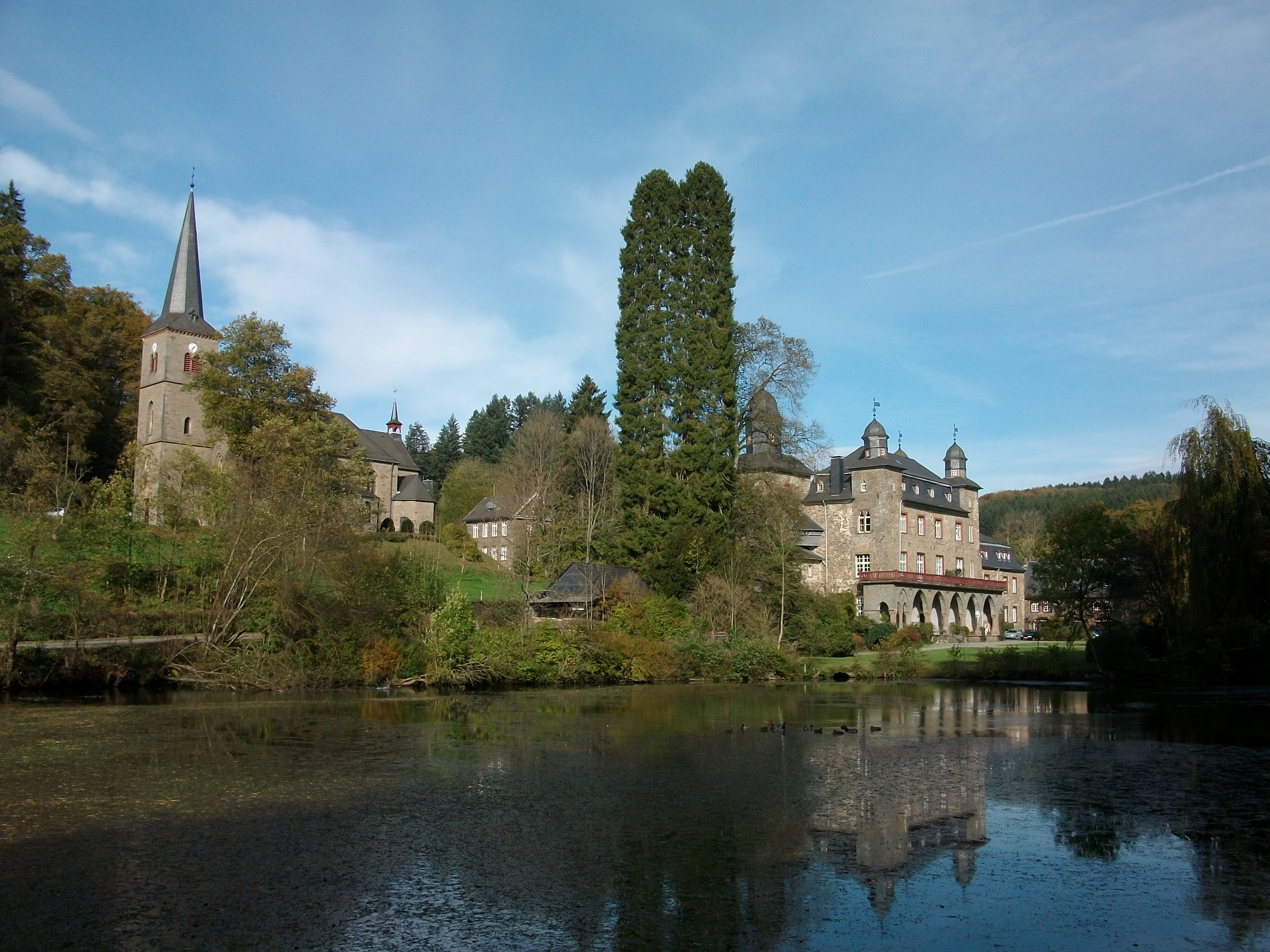
Castle and church

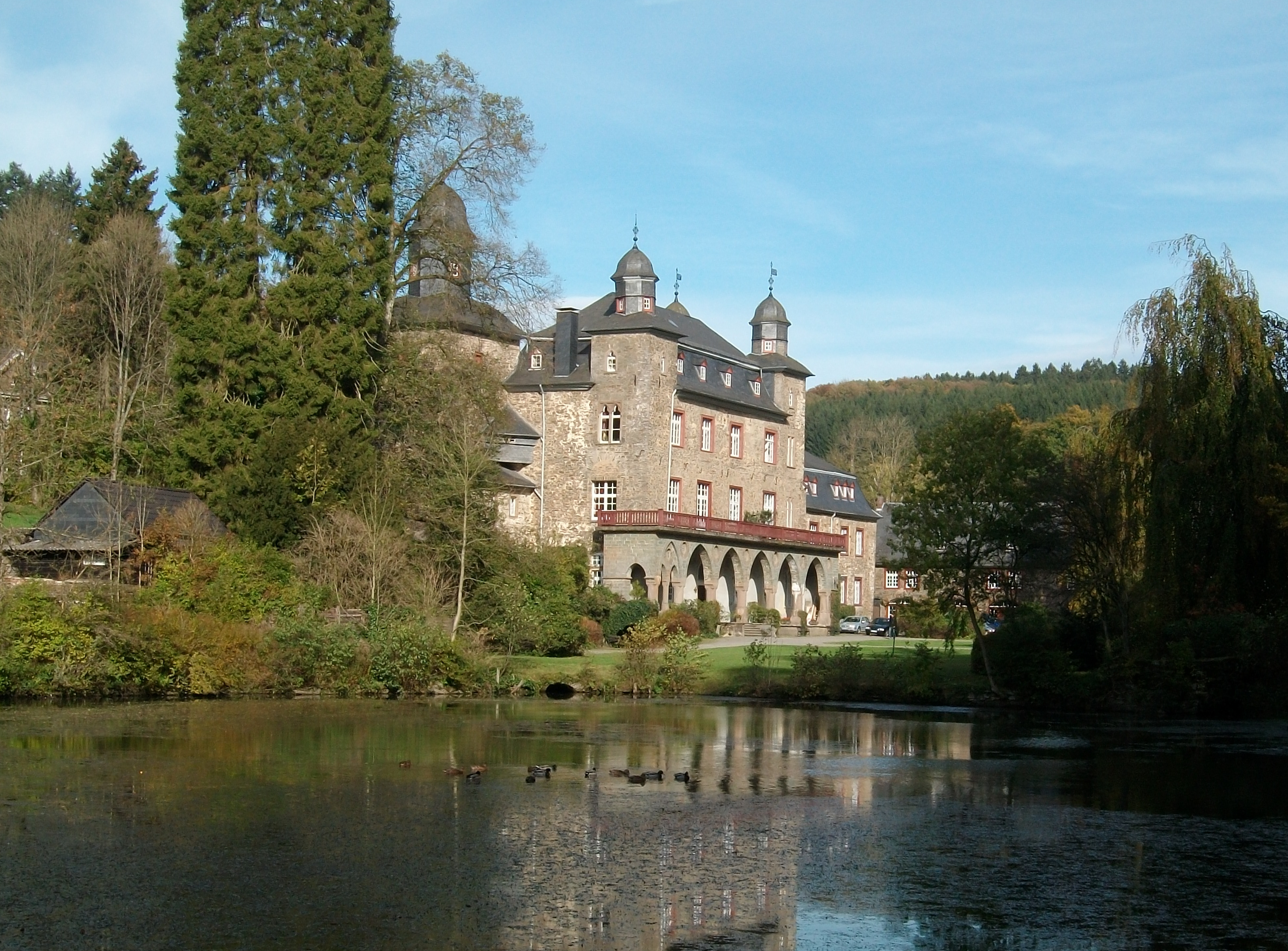
Castle

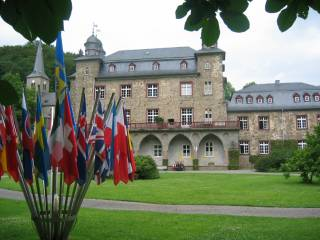
Park

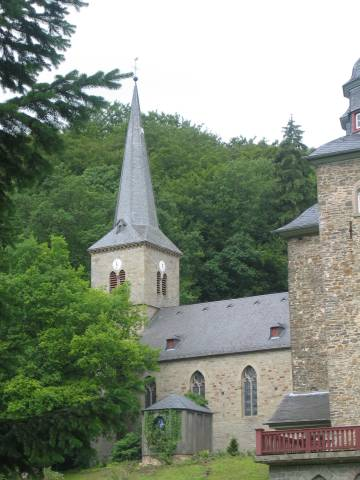
The church located above the Castle
