= Heiligenhoven Castle =

Historical building in Lindlar, Germany

- Schloss Heiligenhoven
- Lindlar, Oberbergischer Kreis, North Rhine-Westphalia, Germany
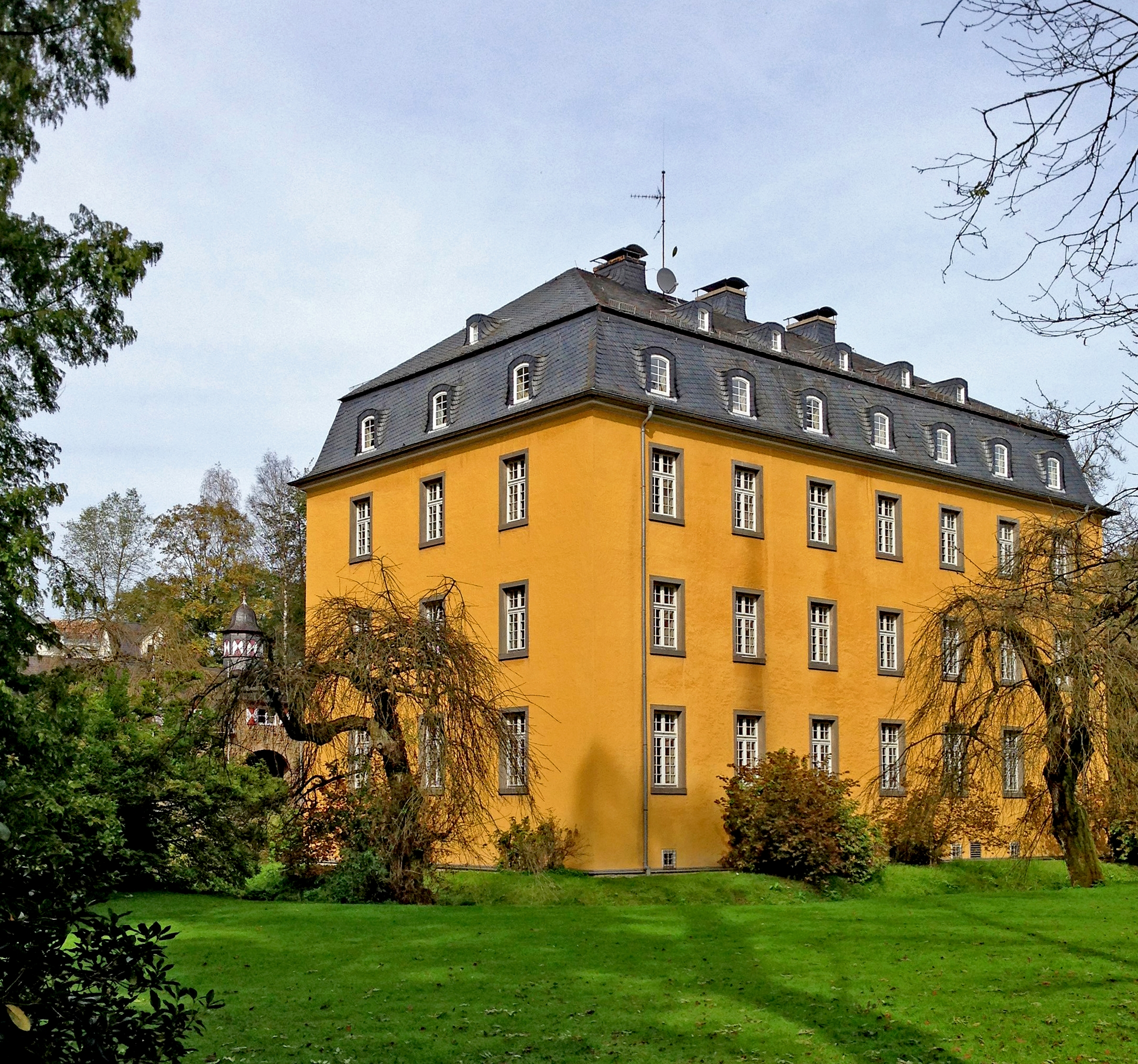
- Heiligenhoven Castle's manor house

Site information
- Owner: Landschaftsverband Rheinland
- Open to the public: No

Location
- Coordinates: 51.0140°N 7.3558°E

Site history
- Built: 1273
- Built by: Johann van Eyckelinckhoyven
- Materials: Quarrystone

Heiligenhoven Castle (German: Schloss Heiligenhoven) is a historic building situated in the municipality of Lindlar, Oberbergischer Kreis, North Rhine-Westphalia, Germany.

== History ==
Heiligenhoven is a former castle, mentioned for the first time in 1363. The current layout, with an outer bailey and a manor house surrounded by water, stems from between 1758 and 1760. The name of the castle is derived from an old hall name, Inghoven, the house on the slope.

Ownership rights to the property were mentioned for the first time in 1425. Heiligenhoven was in the possession of Rittmeister Johann van Eyckelinckhoyven. In 1461, Aillff of Eyckelynckhoyven acquired the property and in 1573 it changed hands again, going to the family of Wilhelm von Steinrod. It remained in their possession until 1663, when it was transferred on 2 June 1663 to a cousin of the family, Adolf Schenck von Niddegen.

In 1748, Johann Joseph Reichsritter von Brück, Schultheiß of the office Steinbach, acquired the property. He oversaw the construction of a new manor house. In the 19th century, the Westphalian noble family of Fürstenberg bought the property. After 1925, Heiligenhoven was inhabited by Fernandine Theresia Freiin von Fürstenberg, who, as a result of the generally bad economic situation, was forced to sell single properties of the former feudal estate.

The castle was bought in 1928 by Kreis Wipperfürth, who had emergency work carried out to reduce unemployment. Large areas of forest were cleared on which the farms Eibachhof, Krähenhof, Tannenhof, Wiedfeld, Nußbüchel, Dutztal, Im alten Hau, Kesselberg and Weiersbachhof were created. During the Nazi era, the castle served as a camp for the Reich Labour Service and until 1940, the land served as a lodging. From 11 July 1943 to 14 April 1945, the Cologne military district commands were accommodated in the castle.

In 1956, the castle was sold to Sozialwerk Adam Stegerwald e.V. ('Social Institution Adam Stegerwald') which converted it into a recreational site. In 1973, the manor house burnt down and was fully rebuilt shortly thereafter in a neobaroque style. The castle was property of the Rhineland Landscape Association, housed the administration of the open air museum in Lindlar, and could be rented for seminars and conferences. In the outer bailey, which is a listed building, there is a youth hostel which allows a stay of several days for school classes. In 2015, the property was sold to the Dutch company Dommeldal B.V. with the intention to build a facility to treat patients with burn-out. It was not yet operational in 2023.

== Castle park ==
The publicly accessible grounds of castle Heiligenhoven were created around 1880 in the style of an English landscape garden. There is a pond in the park, as well as a variety of very old trees. A footpath (5 minutes) leads to the open air museum.

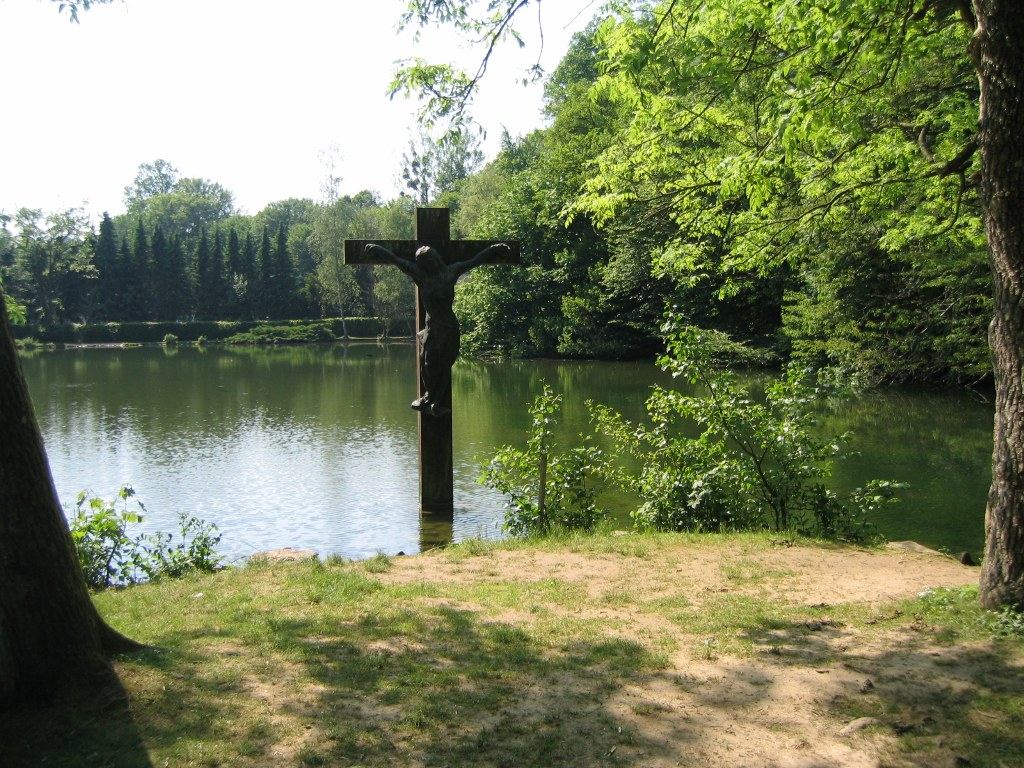
The pond of the castle's park

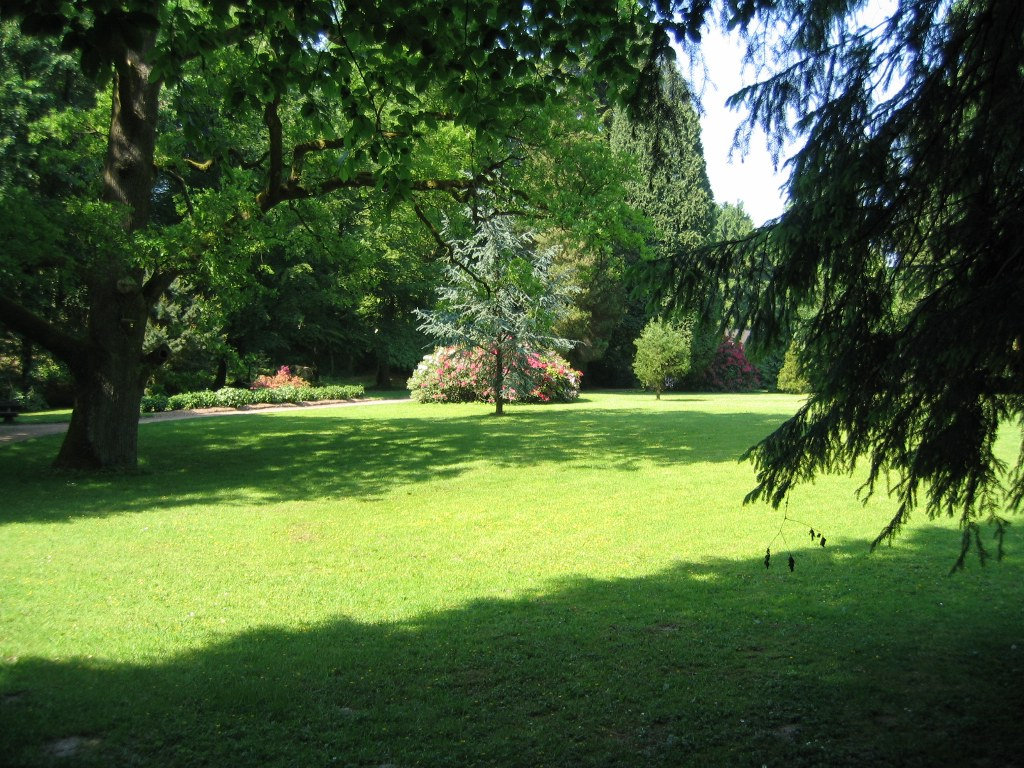
The park

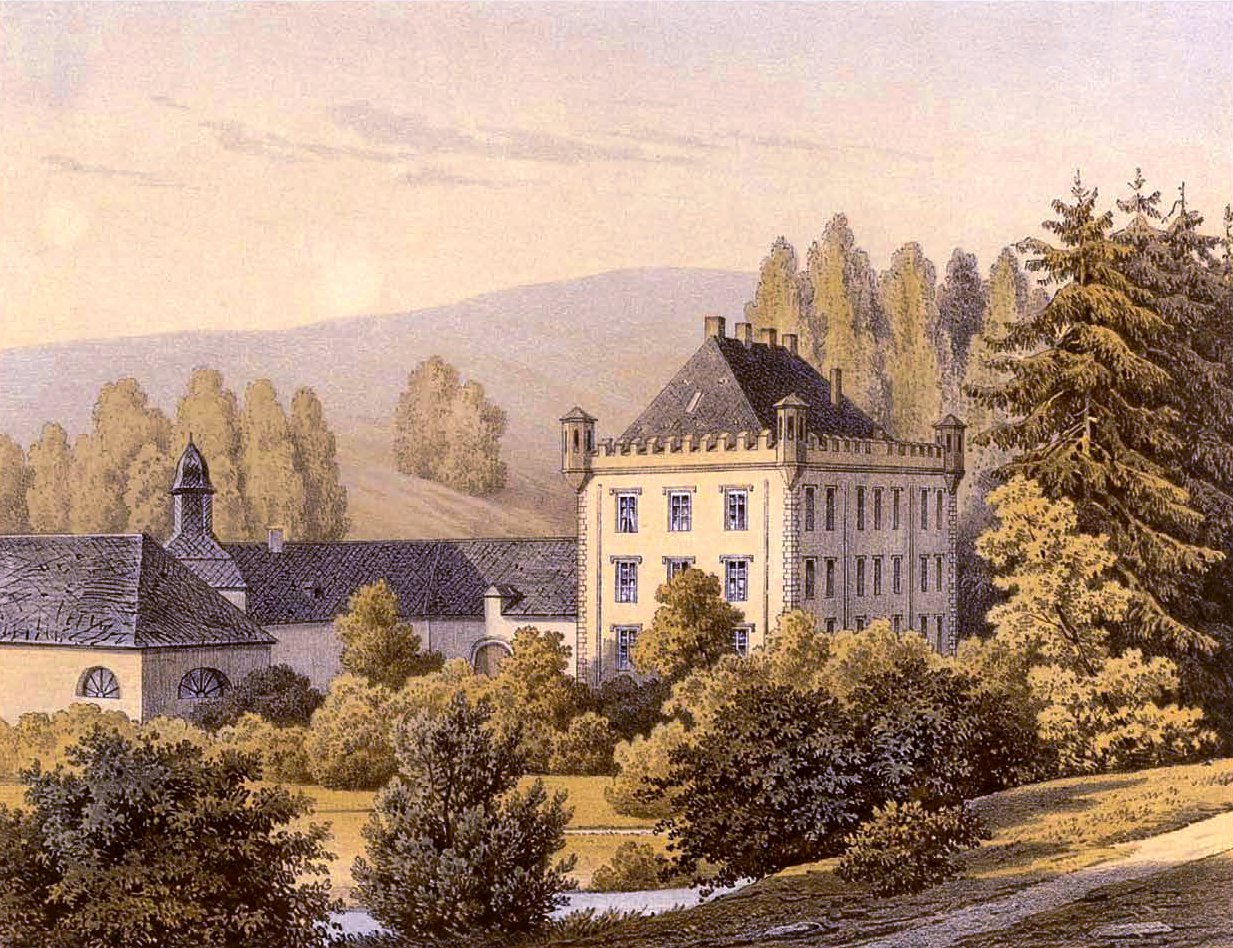
Drawing of Heiligenhoven from around 1860

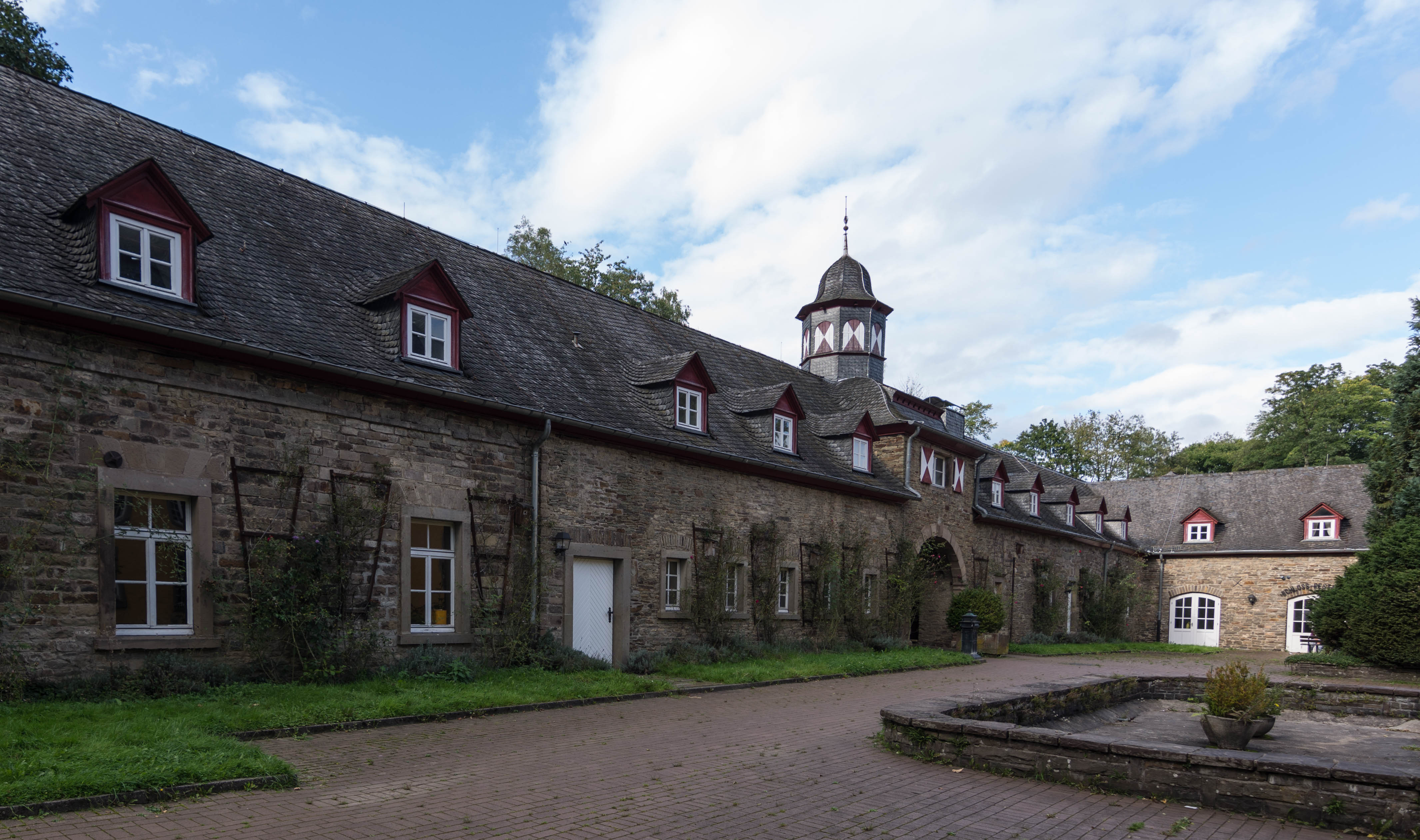
Courtyard
