= Lincolnshire Police =

English territorial police force

Agency overview
- Formed: 1856; 170 years ago

Jurisdictional structure
- Operations jurisdiction: Lincolnshire (excl. N. and N. E. Lincs), England
- Map of Lincolnshire Police's jurisdiction
- Area: 5,921 square kilometres (2,286 sq mi)
- Population: 750,000

Operational structure
- Overseen by: His Majesty's Inspectorate of Constabulary and Fire & Rescue Services; Independent Office for Police Conduct
- Headquarters: Nettleham, Lincoln
- Sworn members: 1,100 officers 200 Special Constables and 149 PCSO's
- Police and Crime Commissioner responsible: Marc Jones
- Agency executive: Dr Paul Gibson, Chief Constable
- Districts: Four: Lincoln & West Lindsey North & South Kesteven Coast & Wolds Boston & South Holland

Facilities
- Stations: Over 12: Lincoln Gainsborough Market Rasen Sleaford Skegness Louth Boston Mablethorpe Grantham Spalding Stamford Bourne (Also a large number of smaller sub-stations, referred to as "boxes")

Website
- www.lincs.police.uk

Logo of Lincolnshire Police used from 2017 to 2021

Lincolnshire Police is the territorial police force covering the non-metropolitan county of Lincolnshire in the East Midlands of England. Despite the name, the force's area does not include North East Lincolnshire and North Lincolnshire, which are covered by Humberside Police instead.

In terms of geographic area the force is one of the largest in England and Wales covering 2,284 square miles (5,920 km^{2}). The population of the area covered by the force is 736,700. As of 2010 the force currently employs over 2,500 people. As at May 2016, there were 1,100 police officers, 200 Special Constables and 149 PCSOs.

== History ==
Lincolnshire Constabulary was formed in 1856 under the County and Borough Police Act 1856. Several other borough police forces used to exist in the county, but these were eventually combined with the Lincolnshire force. Under the Police Act 1946, Boston Borough Police and Grantham Borough Police were merged, while Lincoln City Police and Grimsby Borough Police were absorbed under the Police Act 1964. Lincolnshire lost part of its area to the new Humberside Police in 1974.

In 1965, the force had an establishment of 918 officers and an actual strength of 883.

Proposals made by the Home Secretary on 20 March 2006 would have seen the force merge with the other four East Midlands forces to form a strategic police force for the entire region. These proposals were ended by John Reid in June 2006. The police authority received £287,600 from the Home Office for costs of preparing the ill-fated merger.

In 2008 the Lincolnshire Police Authority experienced a funding crisis. The authority claimed that the central government grant was insufficient to provide efficient policing in Lincolnshire, due to the unfavourable working of the formula used by the government to assess police grants. The authority decided to reduce the shortfall by making a 79% increase in its precept (the portion of Council Tax payable to the Police Authority). The government then announced its intention to "cap" this demand, resulting in a net 26% increase.

=== Chief constables ===
- 1857–1901: Captain Philip Blundell Bicknell
- 1901–1903: Major Charles Brinkley
- 1903–1931: Captain Cecil Mitchell-Innes
- 1931–1934: Colonel Gordon Herbert Ramsay Halland
- 1934–1954: Sir Raymond Hatherell Fooks
- 1954–1956: Herman Graham Rutherford
- 1956–1969: John William Barnett
- 1970–1973: George Walter Roberts Terry (later Sir George Terry)
- 1973–1977: Lawrence Byford (later Sir Lawrence Byford,)
- 1977–1983: James Kerr
- 1983–1990: Stanley William Crump
- 1990–1993: Neville Gilbert Ovens
- 1993–1998: John Peter Bensley
- 1998–2003: Richard John Nicholas Childs
- 2003–2008: James Anthony Lake
- 2008–2012: Richard Philip deJordan Crompton
- 2012–2017: Neil Rhodes
- 2017–2020: William Alan Skelly
- 2020–2024 : Chris Haward
- 2024–present: Paul Gibson

=== Alumni ===
- Lawrence Byford (former Chief Constable) – father of Mark Byford
- Arthur Troop – police sergeant who started the International Police Association on 1 January 1950, with initial resistance from his superiors.

== District structure ==
The Chief Constable is Paul Gibson. Lincolnshire Police has an establishment of about 1,100 police officers. In 2011, the force underwent major changes to its organisation; divisions went and front line officers were organised into Neighbourhood Policing Teams (NPT) and Response (area cars). Previously there were three "divisions" (West, East, & South) with Lincoln, Skegness, and Grantham hosting the divisional headquarters of each.

The county is divided into four "districts" for the purposes of policing. These areas each effectively pair two district/borough council areas into one policing district, and are:

- Lincoln & West Lindsey (covering Lincoln, Gainsborough, and Market Rasen)
- North & South Kesteven (covering Grantham, Sleaford, North Hykeham, Bracebridge Heath, Market Deeping, Bourne and Stamford)
- Coast & Wolds (covering Skegness, Mablethorpe, Louth and Horncastle)
- Boston & South Holland (covering Boston, Spalding, Holbeach, and Sutton Bridge).

The force has armed response vehicles and Roads Policing Officers (RPU).

Officers from Lincolnshire are also detached to EMSOU, East Midlands Special Operations unit. The force has its own underwater search unit that consists of one part-time team of around ten officers and this unit is based permanently at the Lincolnshire Police Headquarters.

== Other departments ==
As with all police forces, Lincolnshire Police has many specialist departments aside from the officers and PCSOs that respond initially to calls from the public. These include the Armed Policing Team, Roads Policing Unit, Rural Crime Team, Dog section, Protecting Vulnerable People Unit (including specialist sexual offences officers), Scenes Of Crime, Custody suites, and the Force Control Room. In addition to this are other support departments such as IT and HR.

Officers and Police Staff forming these departments are based across the county, but most having their main office at Force Headquarters in Nettleham.

Lincolnshire Police operates a Special Constabulary that has approximately 200 officers from the rank of Special Constable to Special Superintendent. Officers are based throughout the county out of local police stations. Lincolnshire Special Constabulary also has offices deployed in specialist units such as wildlife crime and Safer Roads unit.

== See also ==
- Lincolnshire Police and Crime Commissioner
- List of law enforcement agencies in the United Kingdom, Crown Dependencies and British Overseas Territories
- Law enforcement in the United Kingdom
