= Marienheide =

- Municipality
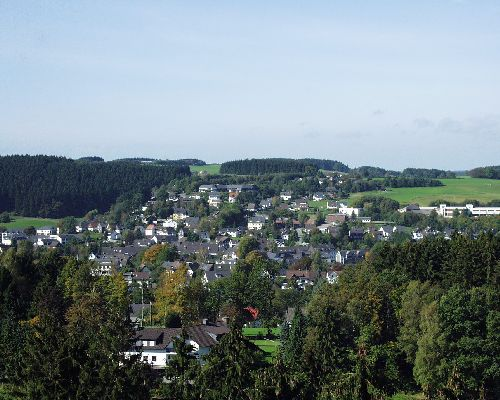
- Marienheide

- Coat of arms

- Location of Marienheide within Oberbergischer Kreis district
- Interactive map of Marienheide
- Location within Germany Location within North Rhine-Westphalia
- Coordinates: 51°5′N 7°32′E
- Country: Germany
- State: North Rhine-Westphalia
- Admin. region: Köln
- District: Oberbergischer Kreis

Government
  - Mayor (2025–present): Sebastian Heimes (CDU)

Area
  - Total: 54.96 km^{2} (21.22 sq mi)
- Elevation: 256–506 m (840–1,660 ft)

Population (2025-12-31)
  - Total: 13,242
  - Density: 240.9/km^{2} (624.0/sq mi)
- Time zone: UTC+01:00 (CET)
  - Summer (DST): UTC+02:00 (CEST)
- Postal codes: 51709, 51704–51706
- Dialling codes: 0 22 64
- Vehicle registration: GM

Marienheide (German pronunciation: [maˈʁiːənˌhaɪdə]) is a municipality in the Oberbergischer Kreis, in North Rhine-Westphalia, Germany.

== Geography ==
Marienheide is located about 50 km east of Cologne.

=== Neighbouring places ===
The neighbouring towns are Gummersbach and Wipperfürth as well as in Märkischer Kreis - Meinerzhagen and Kierspe, and the neighbouring municipalities are Engelskirchen and Lindlar.

=== Division of the municipality ===
B	Berghof - Boinghausen - Börlinghausen
D	Dahl - Däinghausen - Dannenberg - Dommermühle - Dürhölzen
E	Eberg - Eiringhausen - Erlinghagen
G	Gevershagen - Gimborn - Gogarten - Grunewald
H	Himmerkusen - Höfel - Holzwipper - Hütte
J	Jedinghagen
K	Kalsbach - Kattwinkel - Kempershöhe - Königsheide - Kotthausen - Kotthauser Höhe - Krommenohl - Kümmel
L	Lambach - Lehmkuhl - Leiberg - Lienkamp - Linge
M	Mittelweg - Müllenbach
N	Niederwette
O	Oberboinghausen - Obernhagen - Obersiemeringhausen
R	Rodt
S	Scharde - Schemmen - Schmitzwipper - Schöneborn - Schulzenkamp - Siemerkusen - Siepen - Späinghausen - Straße - Stülinghausen
U	Untererlinghagen - Unterpentinghausen
W	Weierhof - Wernscheid - Wilbringhausen - Wilhelmsthal - Winkel

== History ==
The first documentary mention of the place was in 1417 " in a sales document is called Heydenreich of our dear Mrs. Knecht on the Mergenheyde " (Documentary first namings of oberbergischer places v. Klaus Pampus).

The manner of writing of the first naming was: Mergenheyde.

On the altar lights of the old pilgrimage church a signed coat of arms of 1601 which carries the name "Mergenheyd" is to be seen. An old brochure of the Catholic vicarage Marienheide states: " The origin of the mercy place Marienheide dates back to 1420 and to one particular man. " This person, a simple man called Heinrich, lived as a hermit in a hit rock hiding place in the " Bockelsburger Wood ", near the present-day railroad line. The hermit apparently lived from agriculture. Another chronicle, not described further, is stated as a source, and thus one says further that " the mother of God appeared to this keen Heinrich in the form of a small picture and ordered to him to proceed to Cologne to purchase a similar little picture for thirty pieces of silver. " With this the foundation for the place of pilgrimage was laid. Hermit Heinrich has been found with Count Gerhard of the Mark, the sovereign at that time, support, so that Pope Martin V as well as the preacher's order interested. Thus was built "in the wilderness" the first little church and, a little way away, the Dominican order's cloister.

== Population ==
Historical population

Year	Pop.	±% p.a.
1965	11,077	—
1970	11,250	+0.31%
1975	13,166	+3.20%
1980	12,966	−0.31%
1985	12,815	−0.23%
1990	12,059	−1.21%
1995	13,032	+1.56%

Year	Pop.	±% p.a.
2000	13,527	+0.75%
2005	13,711	+0.27%
2010	13,758	+0.07%
2015	13,560	−0.29%
2020	13,443	−0.17%
2025	13,242	−0.30%

Source: Landesdatabank Nordrhein-Westfalen

== Transport ==
The transport connections to the national road system is good. A 15-km connecting highway to Meinerzhagen from the Autobahn A45 (the Sauerland line, Dortmund - Gießen) takes about 15 minutes. The connection via Wiehl/Gummersbach from the A4 (Cologne - Olpe) is about 17 km long and takes about 20 minutes. The town is crossed by the B 256.

There consist the following bus lines:

- Line 336 after Gummersbach or about Wipperfürth after Remscheid - Lennep
- Line 320 after to Meinerzhagen
- Line 308 after Engelskirchen - Lindlar
- High-speed bus line 36 about Wipperfürth after Remscheid- Lennep

Marienheide is traversed by the Hagen–Dieringhausen railway. The RB 25 Regionalbahn service Oberbergische Bahn runs every hour (with extra service during morning rush hour) via Gummersbach, Engelskirchen, Overath to Cologne. Work has been completed for the connection to Lüdenscheid. Service commenced in December 2017 and was improved to an hourly schedule by December 2019.

== Places of interest ==
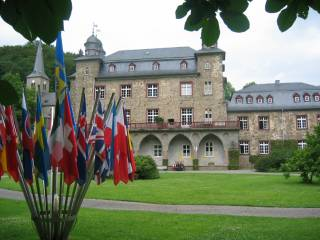
Castle Gimborn

- Brucher dam
- Lingese dam
- The hamlet Müllenbach stands one of the so-called "colored churches", a church with medieval cover paintings.
- Historical house Dahl (farmhouse Dahl), branch station of the museum of the Oberbergischer Kreis.
- The spring of the river Wipper is located in the hamlet Börlinghausen.
- The pilgrimage church Saint Mariä Heimsuchung is located in the central part of Marienheide. It is an interesting sight and the destination of an annual pilgrimage at the beginning of July.
- Castle Gimborn
- House of Histories in Müllenbach

== Church municipalities ==
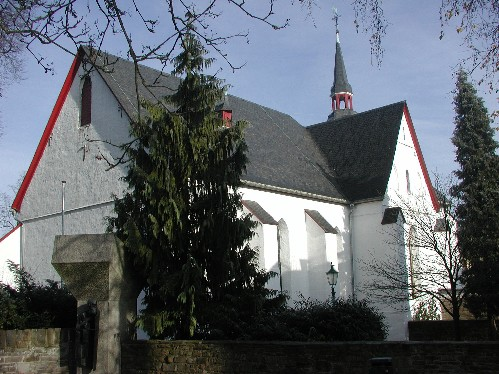
Pilgrimage church Saint Mariä Annunciation

- Protestant church municipality Müllenbach.
- Catholic parish Gimborn Saint Johannes Baptist.
- Catholic parish Marienheide Saint Mariä Heimsuchung.

Wilbringhausen belongs to the parish Saint Josef in Kierspe and, as a result, to diocese Essen.

== Sons and daughters of the municipality ==
- Afu Thomas (Thomas Derksen) - Social media figure in China

=== Born in Marienheide ===
- Paul Lücke Federal Minister of housing; Federal Minister of the interior

== Twin town ==
The Polish town Biała has been the twin town of Marienheide since 1993. Biała is primarily rural and has in possibly also many inhabitants like Marienheide.

== Further sources of information ==
=== Literature ===
- Hermann de Buhr / Martin Wittenberg / Volkmar Wittmütz: Chronik Marienheide, Gummersbach 1986
- Werner Knabe / Friedhelm König / Werner Kühr: Marienheide - ein Blick in die Vergangenheit, Gummersbach 1984
