= Arthur Troop =

British police officer who founded the International Police Association

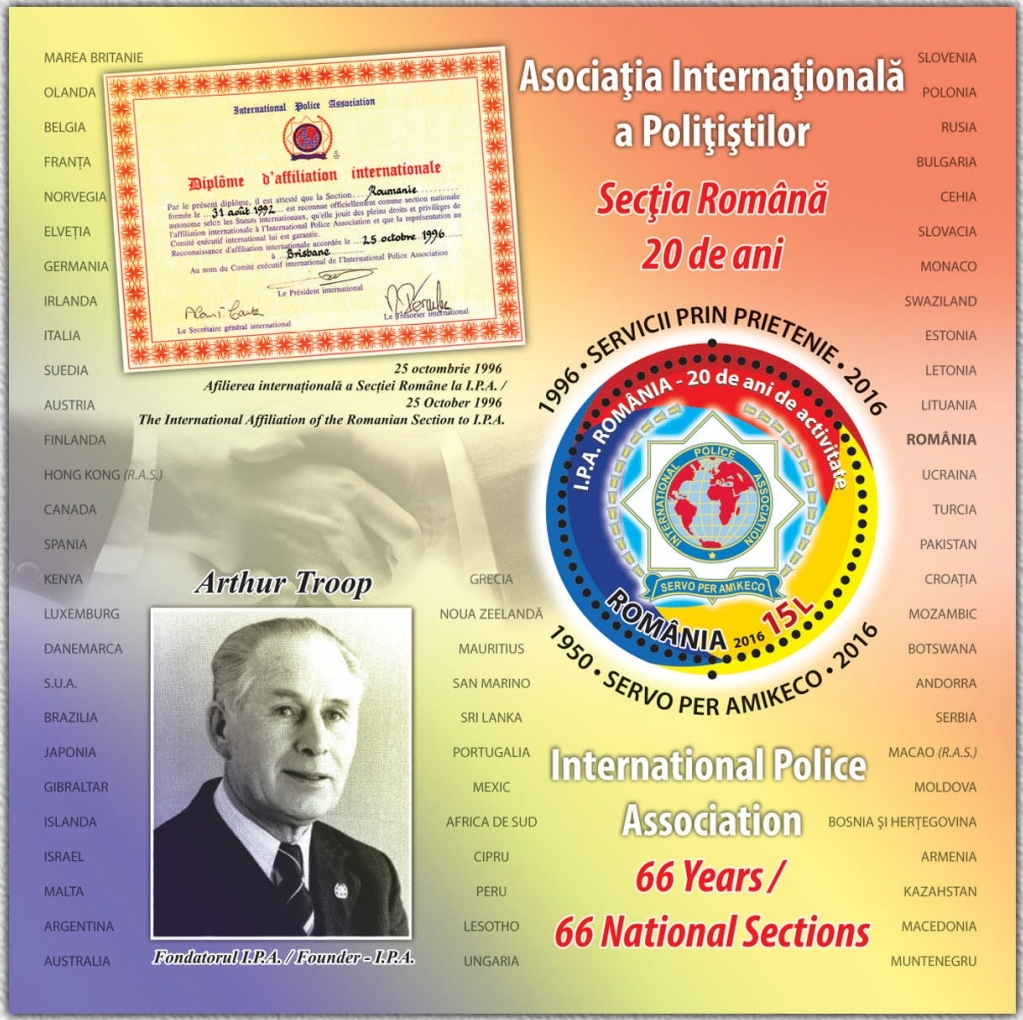
A 2016 Romanian stamp sheet dedicated to Arthur Troop and IPA

Arthur Troop, BEM (15 December 1914 – 30 November 2000) was a British police officer who founded the International Police Association (IPA).

Born in Lincoln, Troop began his working life as a mechanic, but later studied economics and social sciences at Ruskin College, Oxford. In his spare time he also studied Russian history and in 1934 won a scholarship to study in Moscow and Leningrad. After these studies he attended the Agricultural College in Avon Croft, Evesham, Worcestershire.

On 19 June 1936, he joined Lincolnshire Constabulary. He was employed in various departments, but later specialised in traffic. He rose to the rank of sergeant.

After the Second World War, he founded the International Police Association to be a global police friends club. He believed in the positive qualities of friendship, which is why the motto of the association is "Serve through friendship", also rendered "Servo per Amikeco" (Service through friendship) in Esperanto.
