= Lindlar =

- Municipality
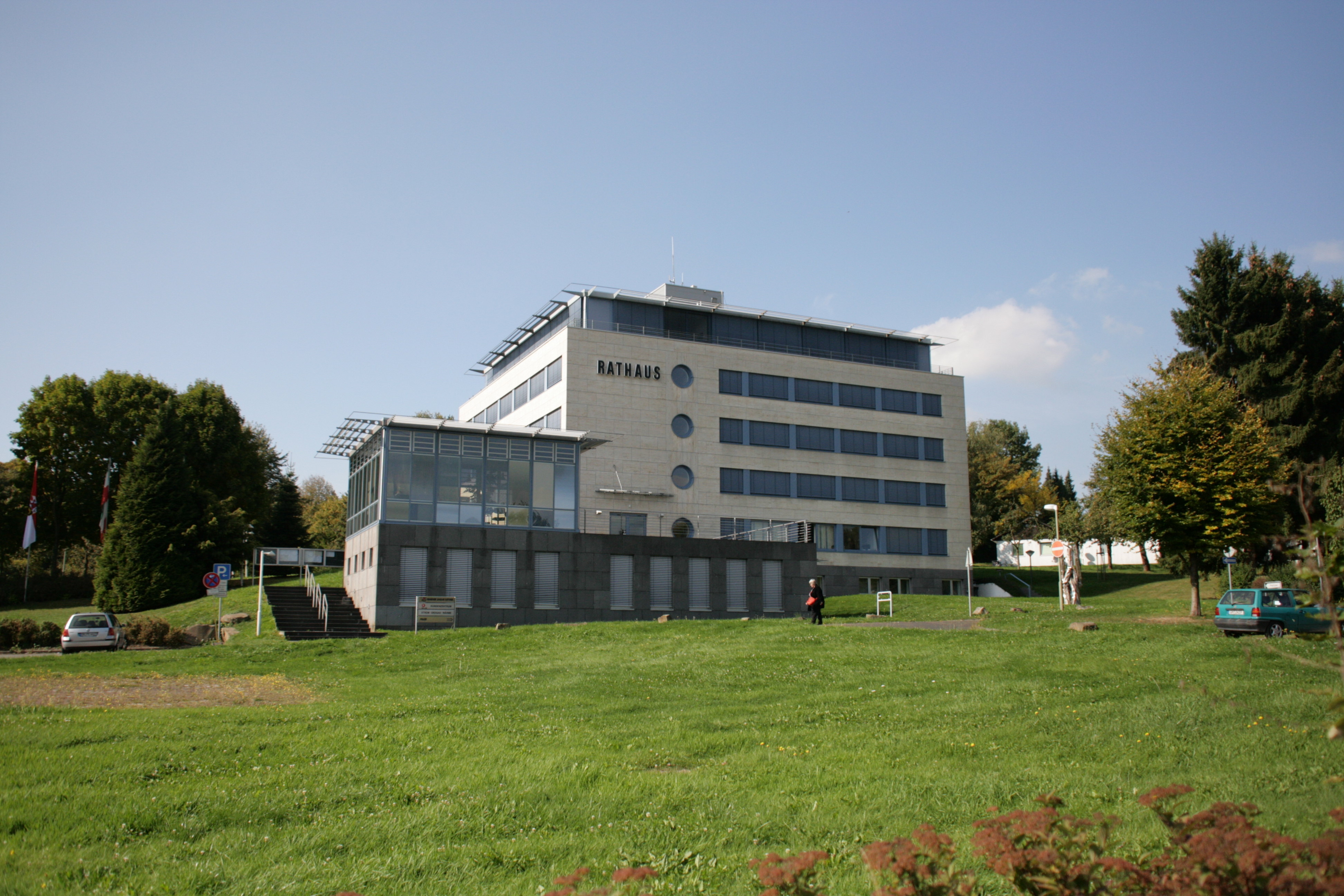
- Town hall

- Coat of arms

- Location of Lindlar within Oberbergischer Kreis district
- Interactive map of Lindlar
- Location within Germany Location within North Rhine-Westphalia
- Coordinates: 51°01′00″N 07°23′00″E
- Country: Germany
- State: North Rhine-Westphalia
- Admin. region: Köln
- District: Oberbergischer Kreis

Government
  - Mayor (2025–30): Sven Engelmann (CDU)

Area
  - Total: 85.88 km^{2} (33.16 sq mi)
- Elevation: 220–350 m (720–1,150 ft)

Population (2025-12-31)
  - Total: 21,521
  - Density: 250.6/km^{2} (649.0/sq mi)
- Time zone: UTC+01:00 (CET)
  - Summer (DST): UTC+02:00 (CEST)
- Postal codes: 51789
- Dialling codes: 02266, 02207 Schmitzhöhe, 02206 Hohkeppel
- Vehicle registration: GM
- Website: www.lindlar.de

Lindlar (German pronunciation: [ˈlɪndlaʁ]; Kölsch: Lenkeln [ˈléŋkəln]) is a municipality in the Oberbergischer Kreis, in North Rhine-Westphalia, Germany. It is located about 30 km east of Cologne.

== Geography ==
Lindlar is located between latitudes 50°58' and 51°5' N. and longitudes 7°15' and 7°28' E. The highest point at 361.8 ms is found near Oberlichtinghagen, the lowest at 110 ms near Oberbilstein.

=== Neighbouring places ===
Neighbouring towns are Gummersbach, Wipperfürth, Overath and Bergisch Gladbach, and the neighbouring municipalities are Engelskirchen, Marienheide and Kürten.

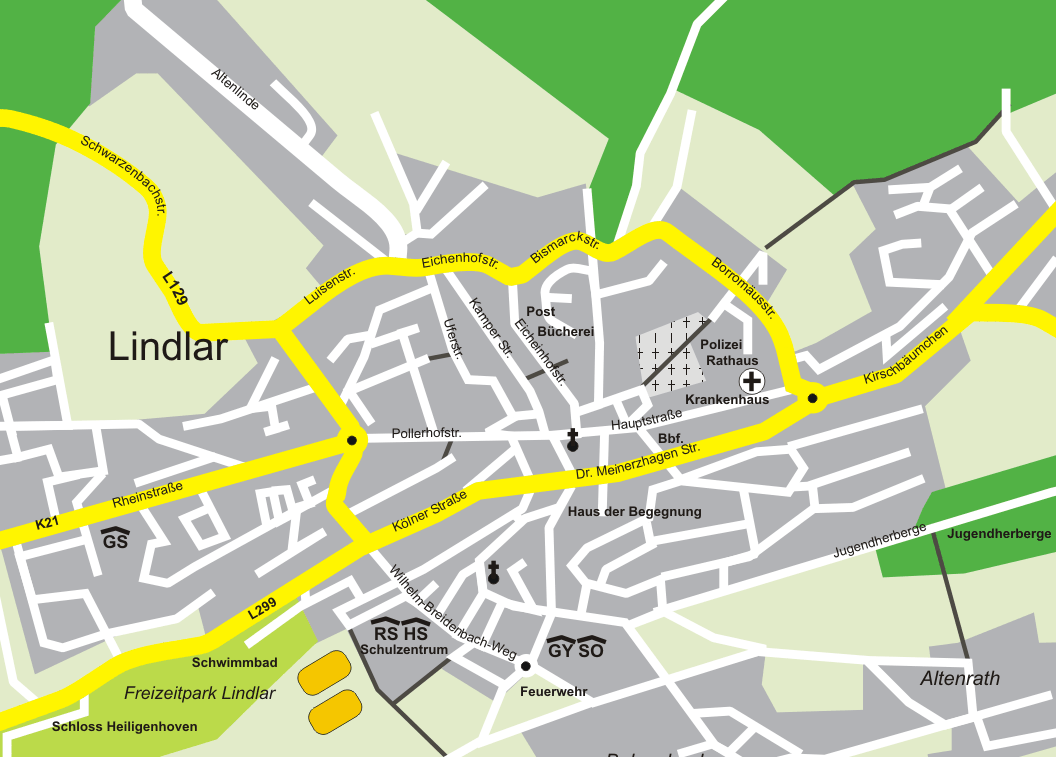
City map of Lindlar

=== Division of the municipality ===
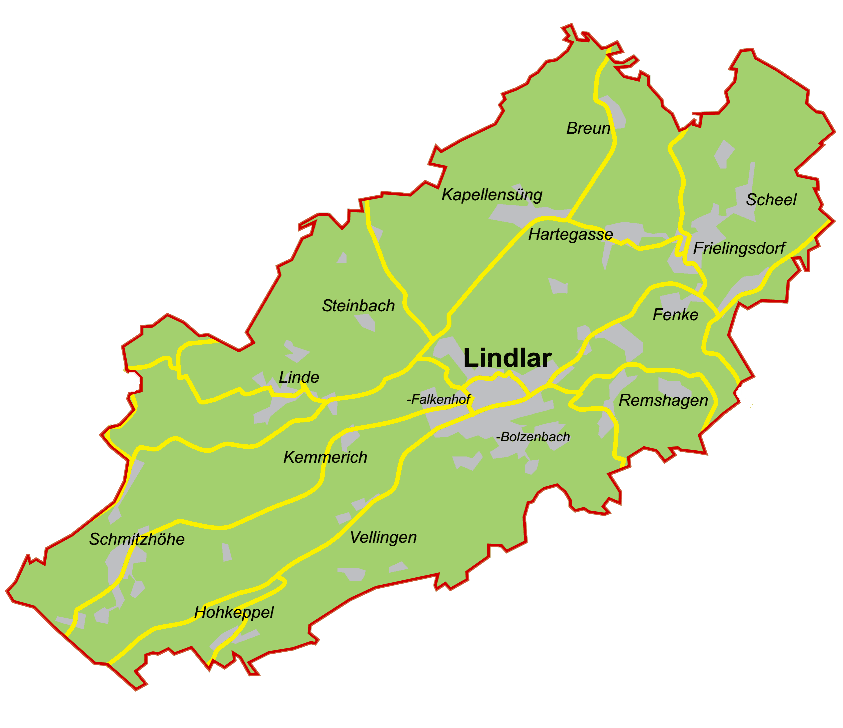
Map of the municipality of Lindlar

The municipality of Lindlar is made up of these main villages: Lindlar (local centre), Frielingsdorf, Linde, Hohkeppel, Schmitzhöhe, Hartegasse/Kapellensüng.

== The coat of arms of Lindlar ==
The arms were granted on 6 August 1935. The arms show in the upper part the lion of the Counts of Berg and in the lower the balance as a symbol of justice. Lindlar had its own court in the County Berg. The arms are based on the old seal of the court and village of Lindlar.

== Twin town ==
Lindlar is twinned with Shaftesbury Dorset England, and Kaštela in Croatia.

== History ==
=== Settlement and first naming ===
It is likely that the area around Lindlar was settled in the Stone Age. While there is no ultimate proof for that, neolithic artifacts were found near Kemmerich and Fenke. Until the Middle Ages the area was covered with virgin forests; it can therefore be assumed that only few people, such as hunters, settled there. The eldest available records mentioning Lindlar -then known as Lintlo- date back to the year 1109. But as an older document from the year 958 cites the transferral of the Kaldenkapellen -now Hohkeppel- church to the Severinsstift in Cologne and as the former was then provably subordinated to the parish church in Lindlar, this church must have already existed in that year or even up to a few decades earlier.

=== Till 1815 ===
The tower of the parish church of Lindlar was built in the 12th century and remains till today, although the tower's roof was built in the 18th century. A nave was lustrated in the year of 1500, and the present nave was built in 1826. The village of Lindlar was centred around the church.

In the course of time more and more woods were stubed, both by the farmers and on order of the landlords. Centers of the expansion were the so-called "Fronhöfe" and the "Herrenhöfe". Here the farmers had to pay their tenth and the work of courts and administration were done.

The "Bergische Land" was divided in departments and circuits. The area around Lindlar, including Wipperfeld, Bechen, Kürten, Olpe, Lindlar, Overath, Engelskirchen, Hohkeppel and Wipperfürth formed the department of Steinbach. Steinbach is a small village next to Lindlar and was named after the castle of Steinbach.

In this time a county court was set up in Lindlar. In 1440 Hohkeppel and in 1554 Engelskirchen had their own parish churches.

In 1806 Napoleon bestowed upon the county of Berg the honour of being a grand duchy. The county court in Lindlar remained, but was renamed in "Friedensgericht". Furthermore, the "canton Lindlar" was formed.

=== 1815–1870 ===
After 1815 the whole Rhineland became part of Preußen and the "district Wipperfürth" was set up. In 1828 the population of Lindlar was 5430, 5396 were Catholic and only 34 Protestants.

=== 1871–1918 ===
In 1882 an auxiliary fire brigade in Lindlar was arranged. A new building for the county court in Lindlar had to be built in 1895. In 1897 the municipal council first reflected upon the idea of a railway connection to Lindlar. The idea was to build a connection to Immekeppel where a train to Cologne departed and arrived. In 1906 this was allowed by the government and the railway Cologne – Bergisch Gladbach – Immekeppel – Lindlar was opened in 1912. There were several elementary schools in Lindlar: in the town of Lindlar, Linde, Waldbruch, Süng, Frielingsdorf, Hohkeppel, Schmitzhöhe and Kalkofen. Since the priest Johannes Fischer and the carpenter Christian MIebach gave their legacy for a new hospital, a hospital was built in Lindlar and opened in 1891. In 1904 a new townhall was built.

== Population of Lindlar ==
Historical population

Year	Pop.	±% p.a.
1816	5,050	—
1825	5,406	+0.76%
1828	5,430	+0.15%
1890	6,292	+0.24%
1922	6,670	+0.18%
1938	6,939	+0.25%
1946	10,339	+5.11%
1958	11,069	+0.57%
1965	14,735	+4.17%
1970	15,076	+0.46%
1975	15,855	+1.01%

Year	Pop.	±% p.a.
1980	16,990	+1.39%
1985	17,798	+0.93%
1990	19,307	+1.64%
1995	20,804	+1.50%
2000	22,341	+1.44%
2005	22,659	+0.28%
2010	22,074	−0.52%
2015	21,382	−0.63%
2020	21,430	+0.04%
2025	21,521	+0.08%

Source: Landesdatabank Nordrhein-Westfalen (1965-2025)

== Localities ==
- Abrahamstal
- Altenhof
- Altenrath
- Berg
- Berghäuschen
- Berghausen
- Böhl
- Bolzenbach
- Bomerich
- Bonnersüng
- Breun
- Brochhagen
- Bruch
- Brückerhof
- Buchholz
- Burg
- Dassiefen
- Diepenbach
- Dutztal
- Ebbinghausen
- Eibach
- Eibachhof
- Eibacherhammer
- Eichholz
- Ellersbach
- Fahn
- Falkenhof
- Feld
- Fenke
- Felsenthal
- Frangenberg
- Frielinghausen
- Frielingsdorf
- Localities
- Hammen
- Hartegasse
- Hausgrund
- Heibach
- Heiligenhoven
- Helle
- Herkenhähn
- Hinterrübach
- Hönighausen
- Hoffstadt
- Hohbusch
- Hohkeppel
- Holl
- Holz
- Hommerich
- Horpe
- Kaiserau
- Kalkofen
- Kaltenborn
- Kapellensüng
- Kaufmannsommer
- Kemmerich
- Kepplermühle
- Klause
- Klespe
- Kleuelshöhe
- Köttingen
- Krähenhof
- Krähsiefen
- Kuhlbach
- Kurtenbach
- Leienhöhe
- Lenneferberg
- Lennefermühle
- Lichtinghagen
- Linde
- Lingenbach
- Löhsüng
- Loxsteeg
- Merlenbach
- Mittelbreidenbach
- Mittelbrochhagen
- Mittelheiligenhoven
- Mittelsteinbach
- Müllemich
- Müllerhof
- Müllersommer
- Oberbilstein
- Oberschümmerich
- Obersülze
- Obersteinbach
- Ohl
- Orbach
- Neuenfeld
- Niederhabbach
- Oberbergscheid
- Oberbreidenbach
- Oberbrochhagen
- Oberbüschem
- Oberfeld
- Oberfrielingshausen
- Oberhabbach
- Oberheiligenhoven
- Oberhürholz
- Oberkotten
- Oberlichtinghagen
- Ommerborn
- Quabach
- Rehbach
- Remshagen
- Reudenbach
- Roderwiese
- Rölenommer
- Rübach
- Schätzmühle
- Scheel
- Scheelermühle
- Scheller
- Scheurenhof
- Schlürscheid
- Schlüsselberg
- Schmitzhöhe
- Schneppensiefen
- Schönenborn
- Schümmerich
- Schwarzenbach
- Siebensiefen
- Sieferhof
- Spich
- Steinenbrache
- Steinenbrücke
- Steinscheid
- Stelberg
- Stolzenbach
- Stoppenbach
- Süng
- Süttenbach
- Tannenhof
- Tüschem
- Unterbergscheid
- Unterbüschem
- Unterbreidenbach
- Unterbrochhagen
- Unterfeld
- Unterfrielingshausen
- Unterheiligenhoven
- Unterhürholz
- Unterkotten
- Unterlichtinghagen
- Unterommer
- Unterschümmerich
- Untersteinbach
- Untersülze
- Vellingen
- Vorderrübach
- Voßbruch
- Waldbruch
- Waldheim
- Wallerscheid
- Weiersbach
- Welzen
- Weyer
- Wiedfeld
- Wiesengrund
- Wilhelmshöhe
- Wurtscheid
- Wüstenhof
- Zäun

== Culture ==
=== Church municipalities ===
Up to the Second World War Lindlar was predominantly a Catholic, Protestant inhabitant had to be established on account of the increased number in 1956 a Protestant church. In addition, at the beginning 1990s a Protestant free church and a neuapastolische church settled. Now thus there is in Lindlar:

- 6 Catholic churches in Lindlar, Frielingsdorf, Kapellensüng, Linde, Schmitzhöhe and Hohkeppel
- 2 Protestant churches in Lindlar and Frielingsdorf
- a Protestant free church in Lindlar
- a New Apostolic Church in Lindlar

=== Cultural facilities ===
Lindlar has a cultural center with over 800 seats where theatrical and musical events take place regularly. Smaller events are held in the council hall at the "Old School" on Eichenhofstrasse.

The municipality library Lindlar houses a choice of books and is helped financially by a conveyor association, so that the lending is free so far.

=== Markets ===
Regularly flea markets, art craftsman markets, farm markets take place in the Bergischen open-air museum as well as a Christmas fair. As a specific feature an old-timer market takes place in Lindlar - Schmitzhöhe.

=== Museums ===
From the place lies there not far the Bergische open-air museum Lindlar, it is accessible about the RB25 and the bus line 331 or the SB40 from Cologne or Lindlar. Besides, in Lindlar-Altenrath there is a curiosity museum.

== Places of interest ==
The municipality marks itself "tourism municipality" (resort and leisure place). The historical local cores of Lindlar, Hohkeppel and Linde are worth seeing. In addition, one sees with the walking on the extensive footpath net often one of the road crosses and also many smaller chapels.

=== Castles ===
In the local area lie the castle ruins "Ruine Eibach", "Neuenberg" and "Unterheiligenhoven", as well as this "castle Heiligenhoven " and the "castle Georghausen ".

=== Churches ===
The Catholic parish church "Sankt Severin" was built in the 12th century. There are old Catholic churches in Hohkeppel and Linde. The Protestant church in Lindlar was built from 1954–56.

=== Museums ===
The "Bergische Freilichtmuseum Lindlar" (an open-air museum about agriculture in the "Bergisches Land") and a "Kuriositätenmuseum" (a museum about oddities) are located in Lindlar.

=== Buildings and monuments ===
Lindlar, Marketplace

- Altes Amtshaus: In the 18th century a peace-treaty between France and Austria was signed in this building.
- Haus Prinz: a timbered house build in 1750.

Lindlar, Ort

- Schmiede Lamsfuß (a blacksmith's shop), Hauptstraße, build in the 18th century, 1986 restored.
- Amtsgericht Lindlar, Pollerhofstraße: the building of the former country court of lindlar.
- Alte Winterschule, Pollerhofstraße: an old school for farmer's children ("winter-school"). Today the building hosts a cosy and culturally attractive hotel-restaurant "artgenossen".
- Haus Kelleter, Bachstraße.
- Haus der Begegnung, the former townhall.
- Haus Gronewald
- catholic rectory
- Ratssaal "Alte Schule".

monuments in Lindlar

- war memorial, Eichenhofstraße, 1877
- Lindlar's "Besemsbänger", Eichenhofstraße, memorial made of wood. A "Besemsbänger" is a person who binds besoms.
- A Quarryman's family, Marketplace.

Churches in Lindlar

- Catholic parish church St. Severin
- Protestant church

== Schools and educational facilities ==
In Lindlar are six elementary schools in different villages: Frielingsdorf, Kapellensüng, Linde, Schmitzhöhe, Lindlar west and the Lindlar east. As grammar schools a secondary modern school, a secondary modern school, a high school as well as a special school exist for LB- and E-pupil. Secondary modern school are accommodated in a school center and not far of it the high school founded in 1997. The next work pedagogic equipment is in Wipperfürth. In Lindlar there is also a branch of VHS.

== Public facilities ==
- Youth office satellite station Lindlar
- Lindlar Touristik
- District agency of the police inspection the north District - district police authority of the Oberbergischer Kreis
- Voluntary fire department with four units fire brigade Lindlar, fire brigade Frielingsdorf, fire-fighting team Hohkeppel, fire-fighting team Remshagen

=== Health service ===
Heart Jesus's hospital Lindlar (151 beds with anesthesia, geriatrics, internal medicine, ENT, urology with connected doctor's house. Since 1999 cooperation with the Saint Josef hospital in Engelskirchen form of the Catholic Kliniken Oberberg GmbH.

=== Spare time and sport ===
Lindlar has, as one of few municipalities, its own leisure park. It was established between 1980 and 1982. There are a swimming pool (Parkbad Lindlar), a crazy golf layout, a concert space, an adventure game space, boot rental company as well as several investments is found for sport. The leisure park directly borders on the castle park of the Castle Heiligenhoven and on the Lindlarer cultural centre.

The municipality has more than seven sports fields, a stadium with field as well as one with Aschenplatz, seven gymnasiums, under it two big triple run halls and a gymnastics hall and two tennis courts. Also, there is an indoor swimming pool, including sauna, fitness and sunbathing area and sports field, a sail airfield, riding spaces, a golf layout, a shooting gallery and skittle-alleys.

In Lindlar there are a lot of footpaths and the streets have separate cycle lanes. Cyclists use, mainly, the forestry and countryside tracks.

Lindlar and its villages have a large number of associations which are well established. Most important are the protection associations, sports associations and native country associations.

== Economy, industry and infrastructure ==
From the 16th to the 19th century the iron industry was in the environment of Lindlar, and stood economically in high blossom. Numerous iron hammer and furnaces were run there whose remaining stocks are to be found today partially still. by the way, the agriculture and the down-to-earth craft, for instance, the stone industry (reduction and processing of the greywacke), paper processing, home industry and file cutting was maintained. In addition, in the beginning of the 1980s a settlement of company took place in the new industrial zone of Klause.

=== Lindlarer greywacke ===
For more than 400 years it is diminished in Lindlar greywacke. If this industry fork still hundred years ago was a main employer of the Lindlarer population, today only three producing companies exist. In many places former stone quarries which are today an important living space for all sorts of animal species are found. The Lindlarer greywacke was used on site to the construction, examples for this are the steeple of the Catholic parish church Saint Severin. Also it was sold in the other environment, for instance, to Cologne. In this connection the Lindlarer railroad which transported the rock till the 1960s by railway is worth mentioning. For this target led from the main reduction area - a brake road.

== Road network and public transport ==
=== Highway ===
Lindlar about the federal motorway A4 (Cologne Olpe) is linked up to the highway net. At the best to use the motorway at exit Engelskirchen (in 7 kilometers of distance) or Overath-Untereschbach (15 kilometers).

=== Railroad ===
The next railway station is in Engelskirchen, Lindlar itself is not connected to railroads anymore. On the railroad line Lindlar - Linde - Hoffnungsthal - Cologne a private train was operated until October 1960. Freight transport followed on 23 May 1966. In 2005 the rails were dismantled as much as possible.

=== Bus connections and railroad connections ===
Lindlar lies very traffic-favorable with the A4 (exit Untereschbach or Engelskirchen). Also public transport is developed according to line very well.

== Literature ==
=== German ===
- Wilhelm Breidenbach: Beiträge zur Heimatgeschichte der Gemeinde Lindlar, hg. v. Josef Gronewald, Lindlar 1977
- Richard Fabritius: Lindlar - eine Gemeinde im "Dritten Reich" 1933-1945, Zeitgeschichtliche Dokumentation, Band 2, Lindlar 1995
- Josef Külheim: Lindlar, Wuppertal 1955* Gerd Müller: Lindlar - eine Bergische Gemeinde erzählt..., Lindlar 1976
- Geschichte macht Schule. Lindlarer (Schul-) Geschichte vom 19. Jahrhundert bis heute, Lindlar 1990
