= Balduinstein station =

Railway station in Balduinstein, Germany

Balduinstein
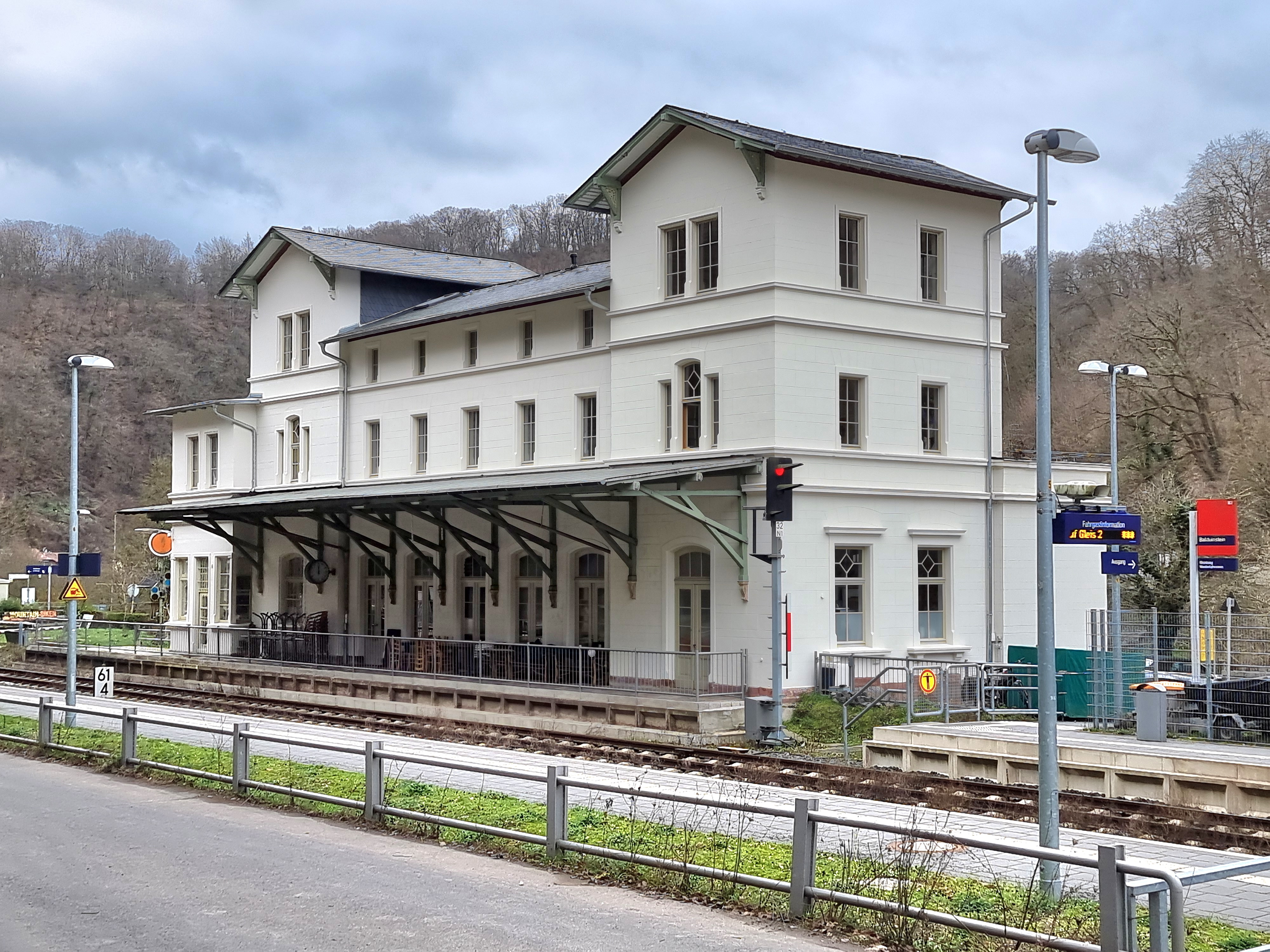
- Former entrance building

General information
- Location: Bahnhofstr. 19, Balduinstein, Rhineland-Palatinate; Germany
- Coordinates: 50°20′49″N 7°58′05″E
- Line: Lahn Valley Railway (km 61.4) (625)
- Platforms: 2

Construction
- Accessible: Yes
- Architect: Heinrich Velde
- Architectural style: Neoclassical

Other information
- Station code: 383
- DS100 code: FBAD
- IBNR: 8000786
- Category: 6
- Fare zone: VRM: 518
- Website: www.bahnhof.de

History
- Opened: 5 July 1862

Services
Preceding station	DB Regio Mitte	Following station
Laurenburg (Lahn) towards Mayen Ost	RB 23	Fachingen (Lahn) towards Limburg (Lahn)
Location

Balduinstein is a station in the German state of Rhineland-Palatinate on the Lahn Valley Railway. It lies to the north of the municipality of Balduinstein on the bank of the Lahn.

== History ==
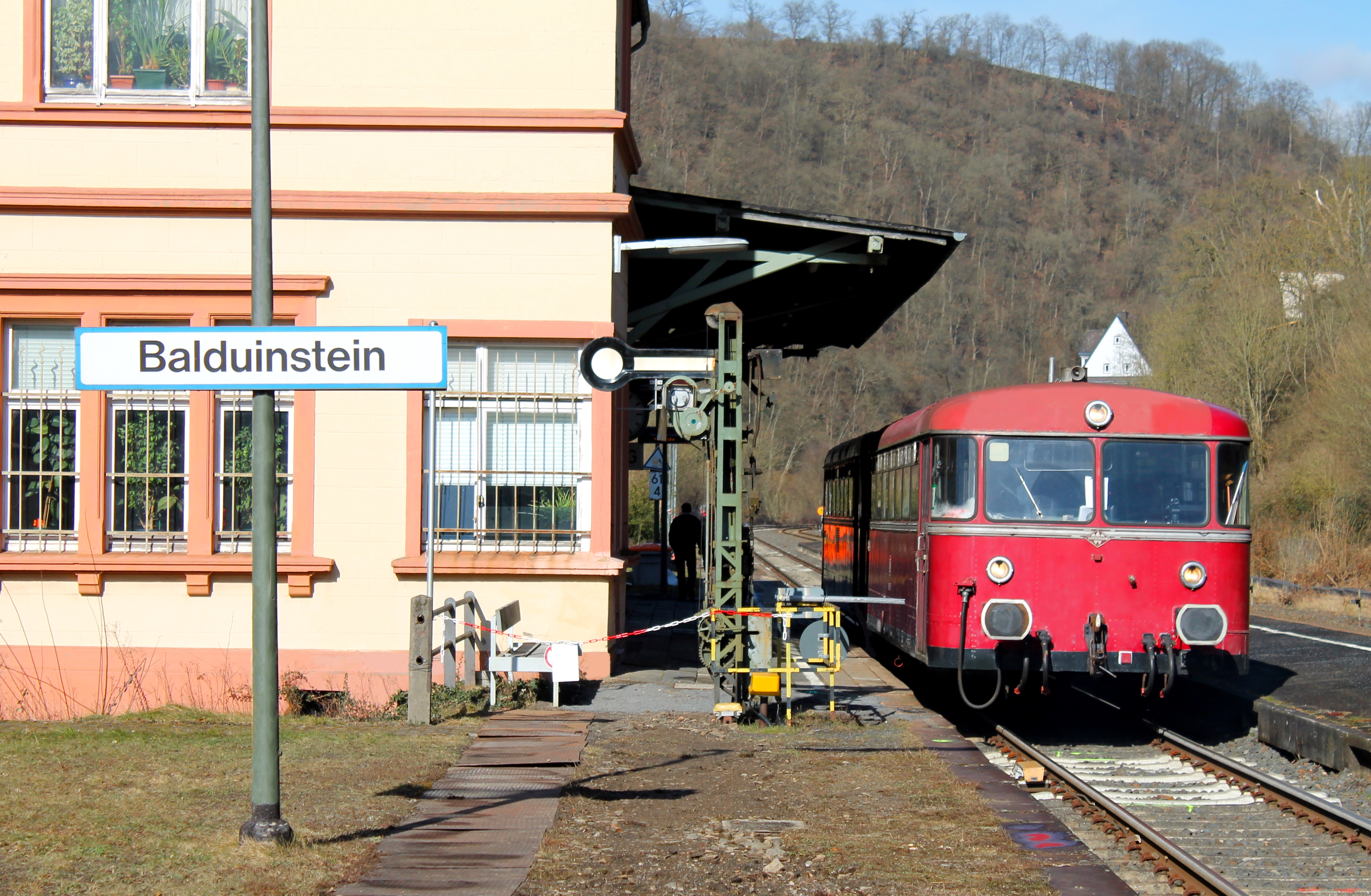
A railbus set of the Oberhessische Eisenbahnfreunde consisting of vehicles 798 829 and 996 677 on 28 February 2015 in Balduinstein station

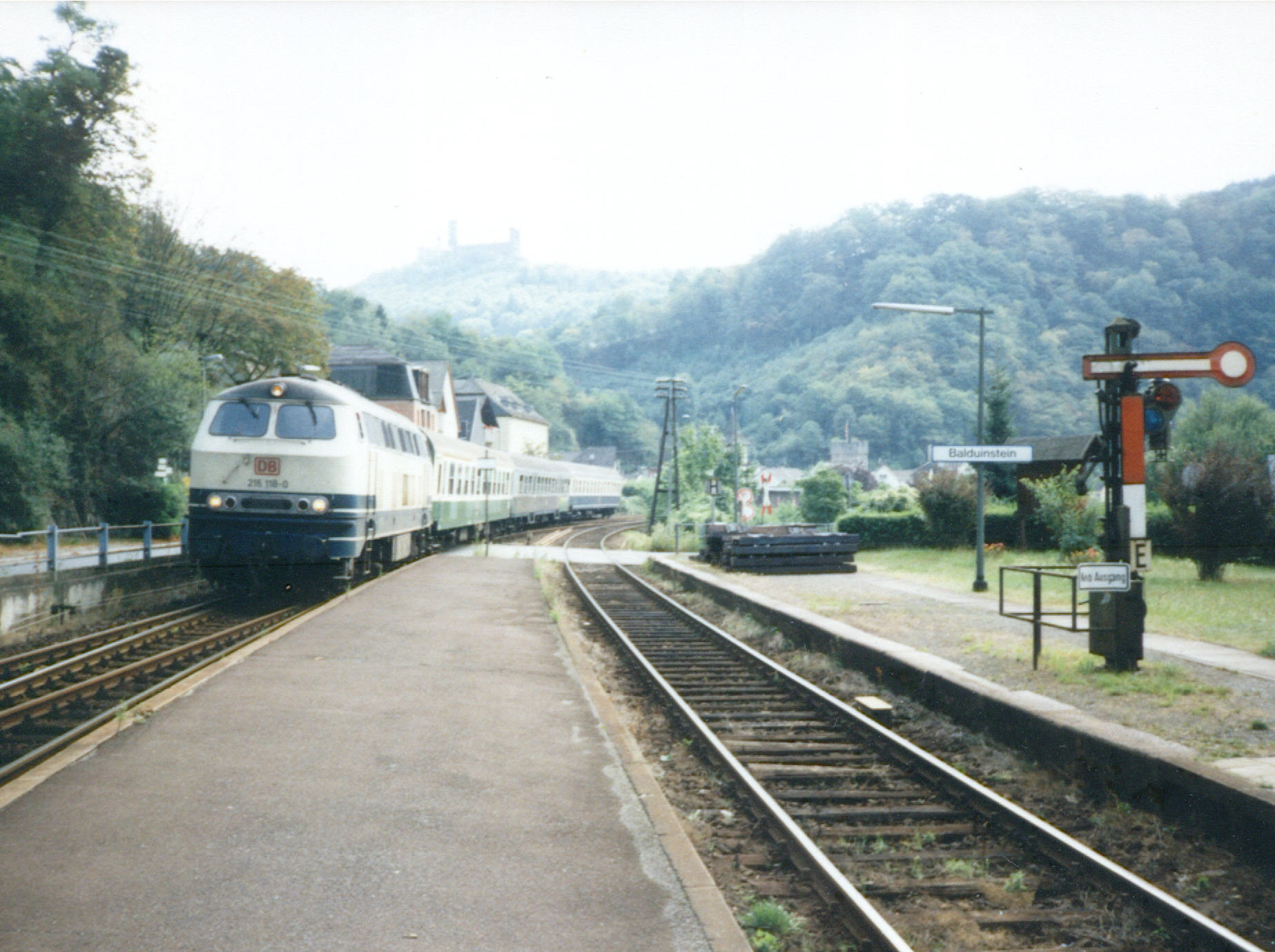
Koblenz–Gießen Regionalbahn service entering the station in 1997

The Bonn construction company Spuhn, which won the contract for the construction of the Lahn Valley Railway between Balduinstein and Runkel, started work in Balduinstein in the autumn of 1857. Since August of the same year, the Georg Mayer company from Alzey had been working on the Cramberg tunnel, the east portal of which lies south of Balduinstein. The resulting material was used as fill for the railway line, which required the demolition of many houses by the summer of 1860. The inhabitants' access to the Lahn was ensured by a number of underpasses and overpasses.

The neoclassical station building was designed by the Diez architects Heinrich Velde, who also designed numerous other buildings along the railway line. The two-storey building was built with three-storey corner buildings and a very large covered porch. Archduke Stephen, Palatine of Hungary, who had moved back to his County of Holzappel in 1850, sought a stately entrance building for his guests staying at the newly redesigned Schaumburg Castle, although this matter was at discretion of the ruler, Adolphe, Duke of Nassau.

The Fürstenzimmer ("princes’ room"), which had a separate entrance from the station forecourt as well as platform access and had 15 square metres of floor space, proved to be too small at the latest by the summer of 1863. Archduke Stephen requested permission to use the corner room of the first floor as a waiting room for his guests. The Fürstenzimmer was used until recently for normal platform access for all passengers.

On 9 September 1991, the station building was added to Rhineland-Palatinate’s list of cultural monuments. The district administration of the Rhein-Lahn-Kreis said that Balduinstein station was "a testimony of artistic creativity and technical activity [...] in the Lahn valley" ("ein Zeugnis des künstlerischen Schaffens und des technischen Wirkens […] im Lahntal"). Moreover, the building was a "characteristic feature" ("kennzeichnendes Merkmal") of the place and the preservation and care of the town's buildings were in the public interest for both urban and artistic reasons.

== Change of ownership ==
Deutsche Bahn AG sold the building in February 2004 to First Real Estate Grundbesitz GmbH (FRE), which became insolvent in the autumn of 2007. In due course, Property First GmbH of Dortmund, Main Asset Management GmbH and the Luxembourg company Patron Elke S.a.r.L took possession. On 20 June 2015, the building was sold at an auction held by the auctioneer Karhausen AG for the "exceptionally high" price of €120,000 to a bidder who was resident in Limburg. With the upgrade of the Lahn Valley Railway, Deutsche Bahn stopped using it in mid-August 2015.

== Operations ==
Balduinstein station was opened on 5 July 1862 with the opening of the Nassau–Limburg section of the line. In the beginning, there were four passenger trains per day. The running time to Limburg was 25 minutes (2012: 11 minutes) with a stop in Fachingen; without a stop it took only 20 minutes.

== Services ==
The following service stops at Balduinstein station:

Line	Route	Frequency
RB 23 Lahn-Eifel-Bahn	Mayen Ost – Mendig – Koblenz Stadtmitte – Koblenz Hbf – Bad Ems – Nassau (Lahn) – Balduinstein – Diez – Limburg (Lahn)	Hourly (+ extra trains in peak hour)
