= Society of Divine Charity =

The Society of Divine Charity (“Gesellschaft der Göttlichen Liebe”) was a Catholic organisation dedicated to vocational training.

Founded at de:Maria Martental near Kaisersesch, in 1903 by Joseph Tillmanns for the solution of the social question through the pursuit of agriculture and trades (printing, etc.) as well as by means of intellectual pursuits. The society consists of both priests and laymen.
