= Lahntal railway =

Railway line in Germany

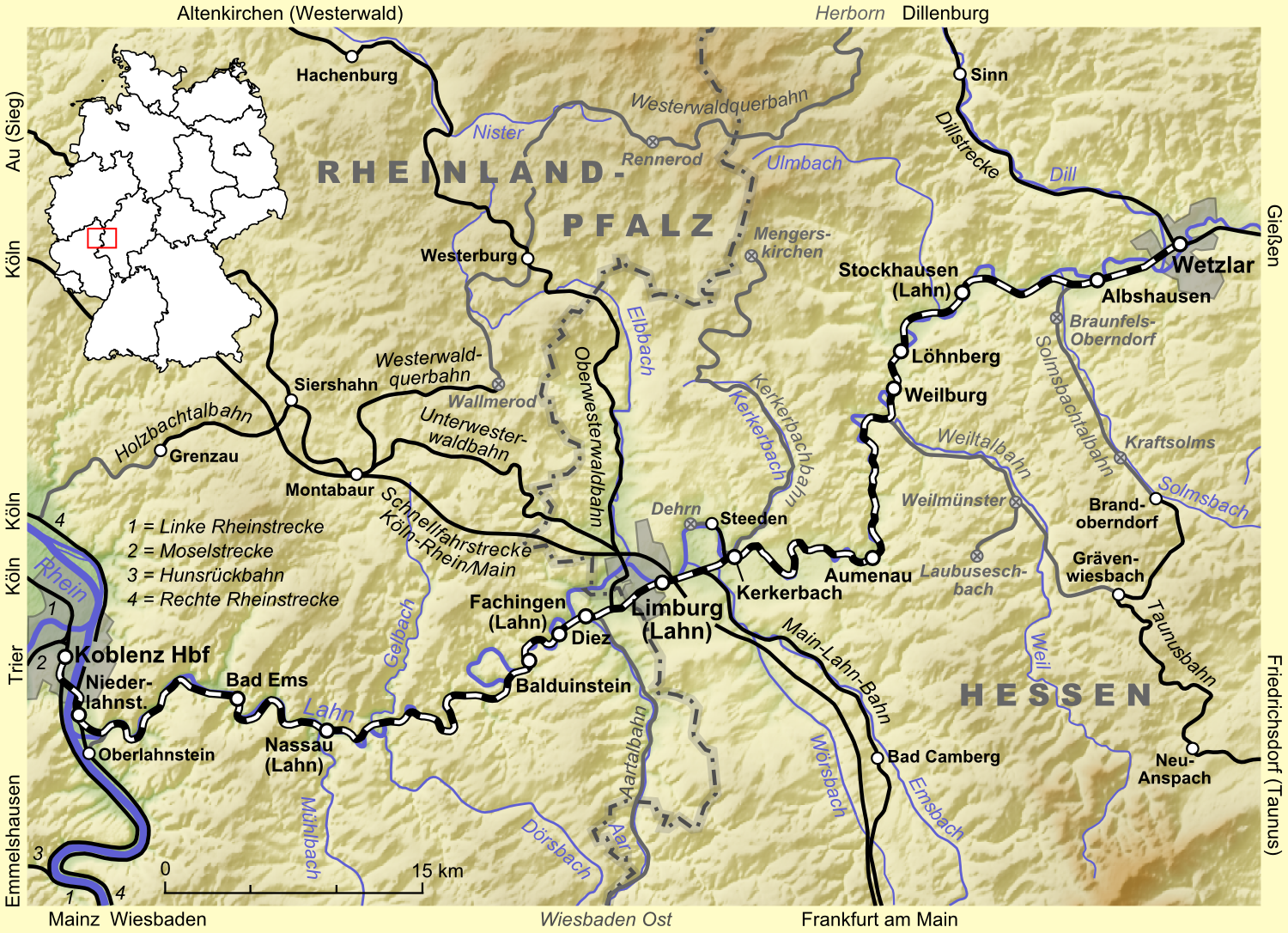

Overview
- Native name: Lahntalbahn
- Line number: 3030 (Oberlahnstein–Hohenrhein); 3710 (Koblenz–Wetzlar)
- Locale: Rhineland-Palatinate and Hesse, Germany
- Termini: Koblenz; Wetzlar

Service
- Route number: 625

Technical
- Line length: 104 km (65 mi)
- Num of tracks: 2: Koblenz–Niederlahnstein; 2: Hohenrhein–Dausenau; 2: Nassau (Lahn)–Wetzlar
- Track gauge: 1,435 mm (4 ft 8 1/2 in) standard gauge
- Electrification: 15 kV/16.7 Hz AC overhead catenary (Limburg–Eschhofen:)
- Operating speed: 120 km/h (75 mph) (max)

The Lahntal railway or Lahn Valley Railway (German: Lahntalbahn) is a railway line between Niederlahnstein in the German state of Rhineland-Palatinate to Wetzlar in Hesse, partly following the Lahn valley (Lahntal). Its western terminus was originally in Oberlahnstein. Trains now mostly operate between Koblenz and Gießen. The line was opened by the Nassau Rhine and Lahn Railway Company and the Nassau State Railway between 1858 and 1863 and is one of the oldest railways in Germany.

== Route ==
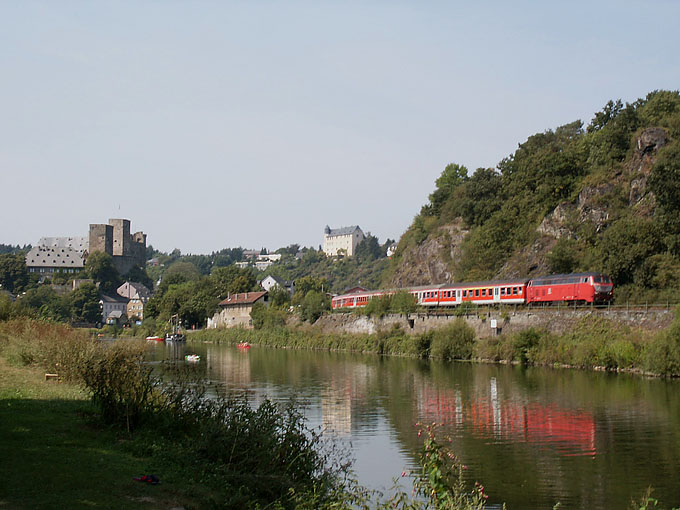
Regionalbahn service in Runkel (August 2003)

The railway follows the largely winding course of the valley of the Lahn river. It is only a few metres above the river’s surface and is characterised by numerous bridges and tunnels. It is therefore extremely scenic. As the line has never been fundamentally modernised, its numerous engineering structures, semaphore signals and accompanying telegraph lines have been preserved. The Hessian section of the line is a listed monument under the Hessian Heritage Act. The signalling of the section in Rhineland-Palatinate was modernised in 2015. The line is listed by Deutsche Bahn as timetable route number 625 and track route number 3710.

== History ==
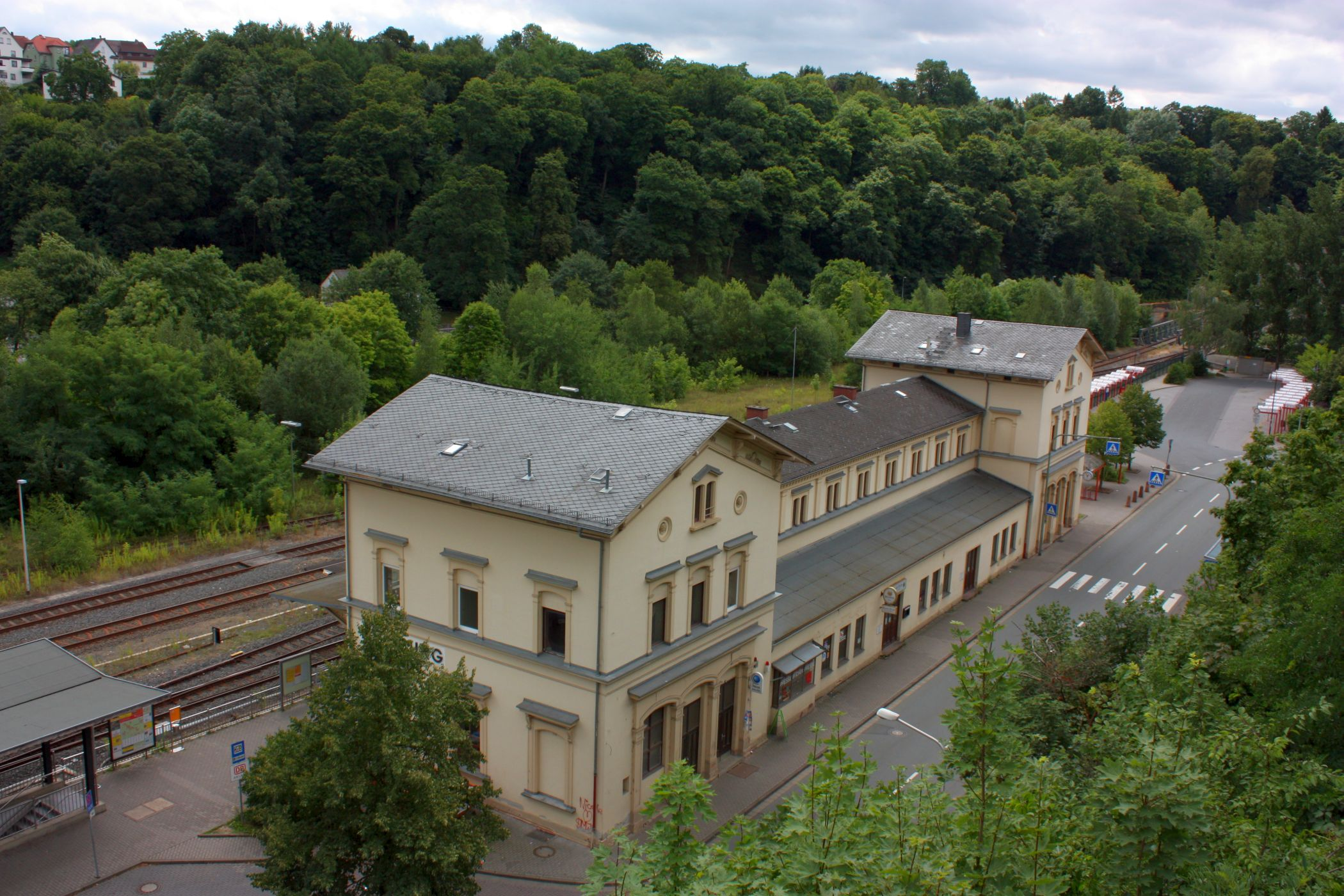
Entrance building of Weilburg station in the style of Heinrich Velde

After the Taunus Railway (Taunus-Eisenbahn) from Frankfurt was completed to Wiesbaden in 1840, a private company was founded to continue the line along the Rhine. This was originally called the Wiesbadener Eisenbahngesellschaft (Wiesbaden Railway Company). In 1853 it was renamed the Nassauische Rhein Eisenbahn-Gesellschaft (Nassau Rhine Railway Company) when it received a concession to build and operate the Nassau Rhine Valley Railway between Wiesbaden and Niederlahnstein. The Nassau government initially opposed the construction of a line in the Lahn valley because it had invested massively since 1844 in the development of the Lahn as a waterway. In 1855 the company received a provisional concession for the Lahn Valley Railway and it was renamed the (Nassauische Rhein- und Lahn Eisenbahn-Gesellschaft (Nassau Rhine and Lahn Railway Company).The permanent concession for the Lahn valley line was issued on 31 March 1857. The first plan for the line was prepared by the Belgian railway engineer, Frans Splingard from 1849 to 1851.

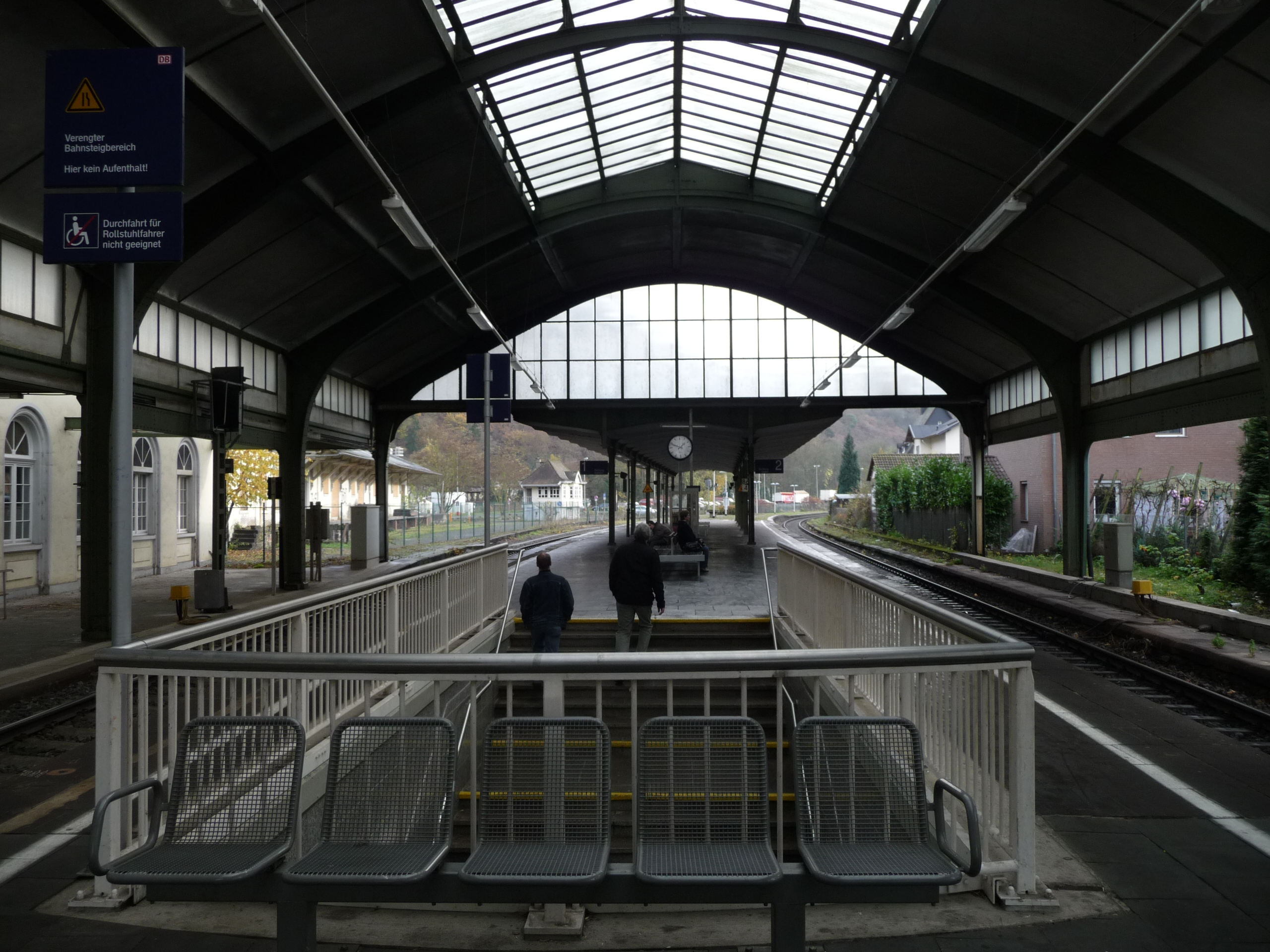
Bad Ems station hall

The first section of the line from Oberlahnstein to Bad Ems was opened on 1 July 1858, but shortly afterwards it was buried by a landslide. Since the Nassau Rhine and Lahn Railway Company lacked the will and the necessary capital for the speedy construction of the lines, the Duchy of Nassau in 1857 withdrew its concessions, nationalised the company, and built and operated the lines as the Nassauische Staatsbahn (Nassau State Railway). The Lahn Valley Railway, as it exists today was essentially conceived by the railway engineer, Moritz Hilf in 1860. It was opened in three sections and completed on 10 January 1863. The extension of the line had more than six kilometres of tunnels. The architect and royal railway and operations supervisor, Heinrich Velde was responsible for the buildings, particularly the railway stations, the station master’s houses and the tunnel portals.

=== Prussia ===
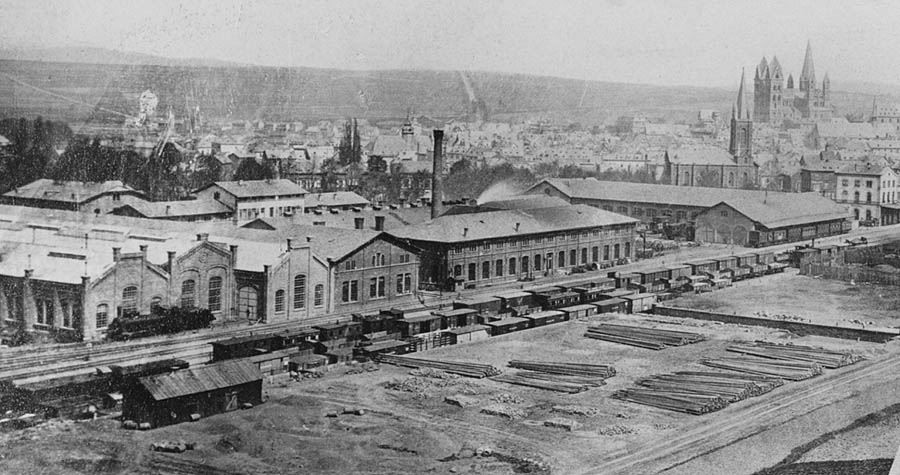
Limburg station in 1880 – the entrance building stands at the right edge of the picture.

With the end of the Duchy as an independent state as a result of the Austro-Prussian War, the Nassau State Railway was absorbed by the Prussian State Railways. Subsequently, a direct connection was opened to Niederlahnstein on the main line on 15 May 1879.

Following the establishment of the German Empire in 1871, the Lahn Valley Railway from Koblenz to Wetzlar was extended to Berlin as the Berlin–Wetzlar railway, part of the so-called Kanonenbahn (Cannons Railway), a strategic military railway from Berlin to Metz via Wetzlar, Koblenz and Trier. As a result, the Lahn valley line was upgraded with a second track, laid between 1875 and 1880. While the whole line was duplicated at that time, several sections between Koblenz and Limburg were rebuilt with single track after the Second World War, between Niederlahnstein and Hohenrhein, between Dausenau and Nassau and between Fachingen and Balduinstein.

=== After the Second World War ===
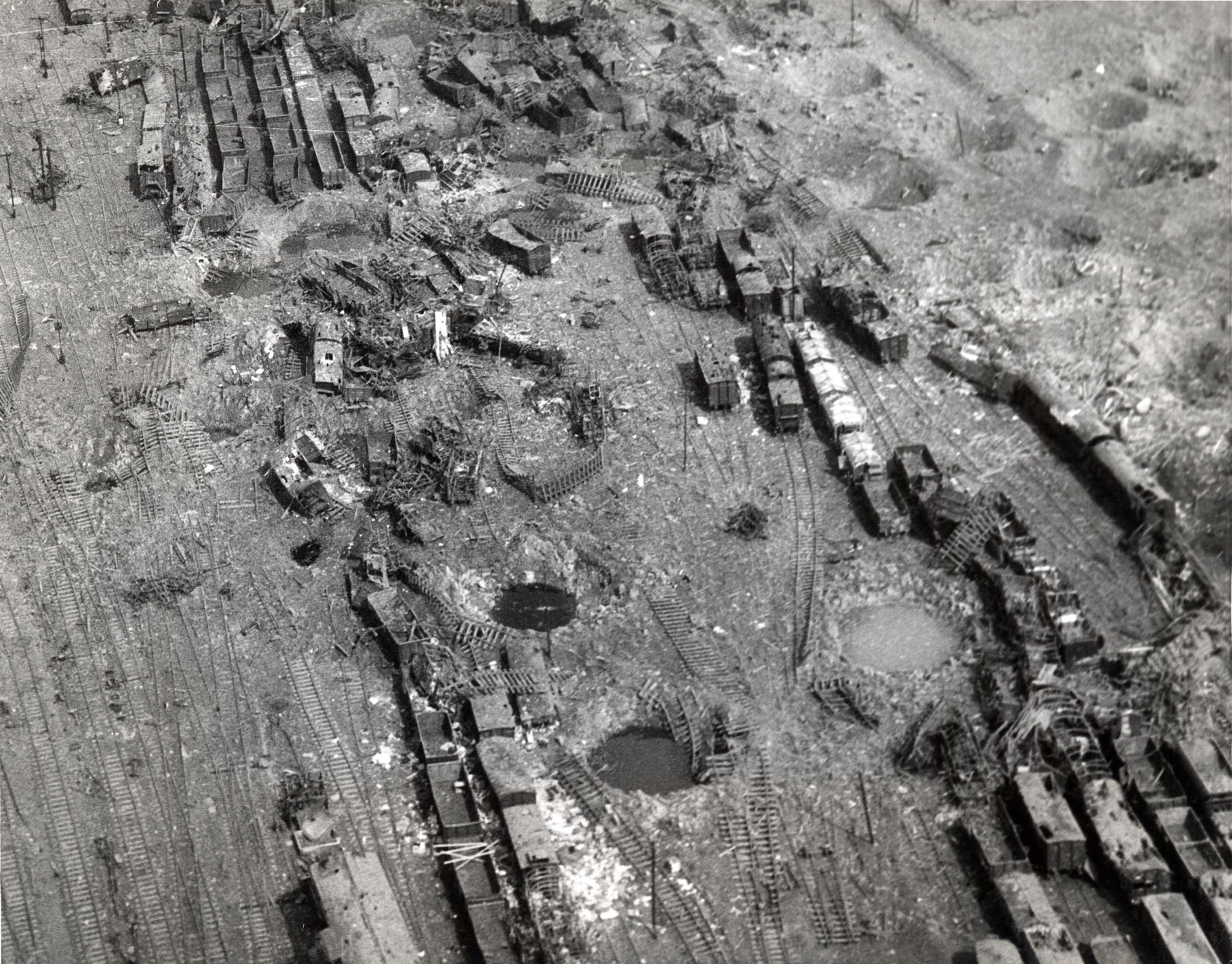
Limburg station after bombing raid on 23 December 1944

The sections between Limburg and Koblenz, Niederlahnstein–Hohenrhein, Dausenau–Nassau and Fachingen–Balduinstein were only re-built after the Second World War. Signs of the war-time damage are still recognisable today on the tunnels as well as on the abutments and pillars of the Lahn bridges,

Weilburg station was renewed and given disability access in preparation for Hessentag 2005. A temporary platform erected on this occasion was subsequently removed.

In September 2010, the status of Leun/Braunfels station was downgraded from Bahnhof (station) to a Haltepunkt (halt), the island station was removed and a new outside platform was built with a platform overpass. This reduced the station’s staffing requirements. At the same time the platform lighting was replaced at the stations of Solms, Leun/Braunfels and Stockhausen (Lahn).

The Arbeitsgemeinschaft Mechanische Stellwerke e. V. (“working community for mechanical signal boxes”) was founded on 21 February 2010 in Limburg to prevent the demolition of the historical and protective signal box Bo. The working community has set itself the goal of rehabilitating the signal box and, in the longer term, preserving it as a monument of the railway history in the Lahn valley for posterity. The signal box is located at the northern exit of Balduinstein station just before the Lahn bridge. The signal box was inaugurated in 1913 and went out of service on 1 September 2003. During the active period, the signal box was constantly occupied by a signalman. A mechanical interlocking device of the Bruchsal J type was installed in 1929. Later, a system operated by push buttons was used to operate the electrically actuated Dr S2 interlocking from Siemens. Since the decommissioning of the signal box Bo during the 2015 modernisation, the dispatcher in the entrance building (Bf) has controlled all points and signals at the station.

In preparation for Hessentag 2012, Wetzlar station was fundamentally renewed. Since the end of the works, the trains of the Lahn Valley Railways have operated from new, modernised platforms.

In 2015, the signal technology on the Rhineland-Palatinate side (Diez–Niederlahnstein section) was modernised; the old mechanical and relay interlockings were taken out of operation, including signals and level crossings, on 24 August 2015 and replaced by a new electronic interlocking called Untere Lahn (lower Lahn) based at Diez station. At the same time, the many low platforms were replaced by new ones with the standard height of 55 centimetres.

== Current situation ==
Because of new safety regulations, a wider cross section is required for many tunnels in order to be able to lay out rescue routes next to the tracks. In 2011 and 2012, the Hollrich and the Langenau tunnels were therefore rebuilt under single-track operations. The work was carried out under traffic with the tracks being switched within the tunnels.

== Planning ==
=== Proposed electrification ===
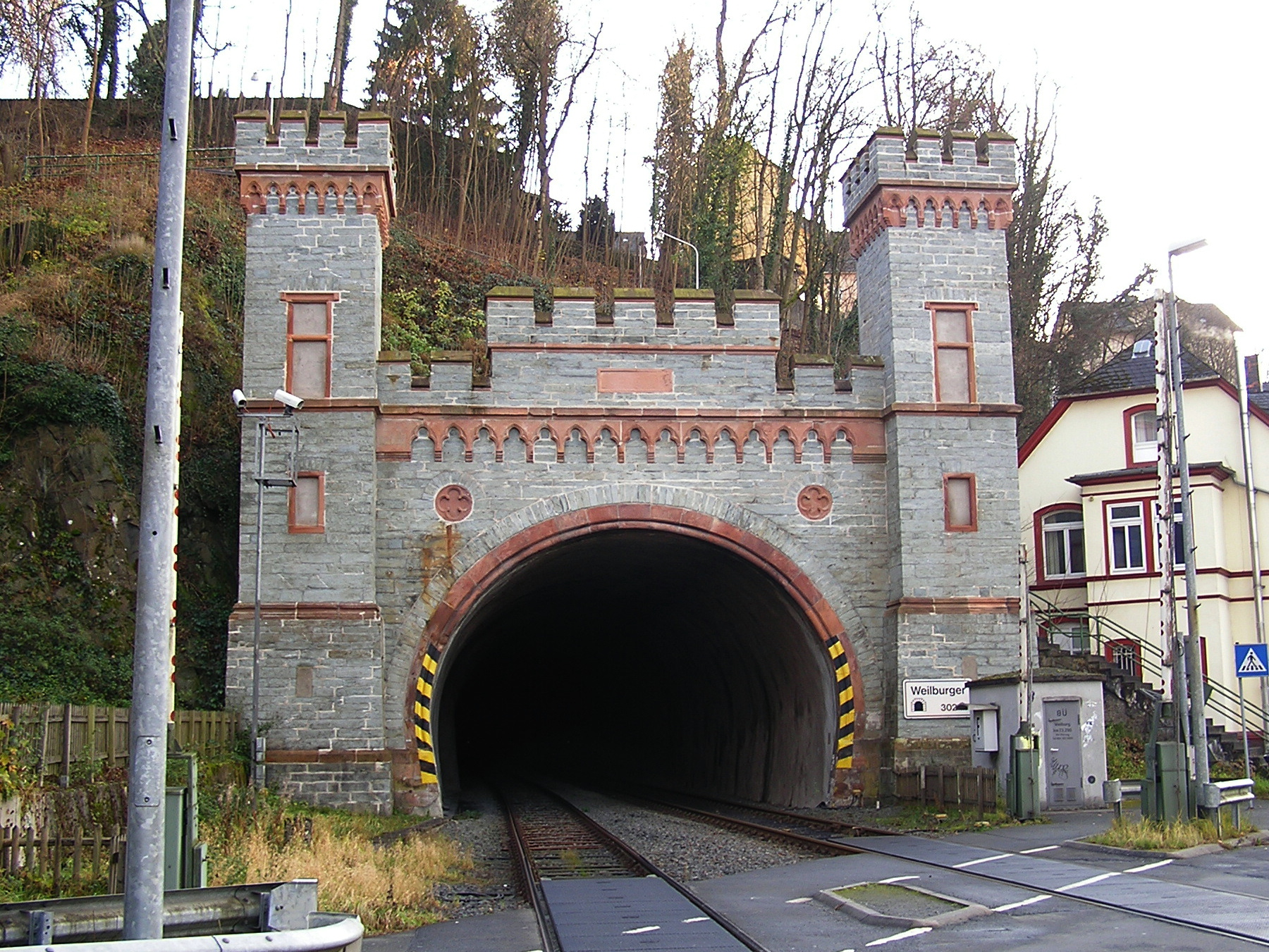
The north portal of Weilburg tunnel

The curving track is unsuitable for higher speeds. The Lahn Valley Railway is one of the few main routes in Germany largely not electrified, except for the short Eschhofen–Limburg (Lahn) section, part of the electrified Main-Lahn Railway, connecting Frankfurt Hbf and Limburg. Since many of the 18 tunnels and several overpassing bridges are too low, the electrification—planned in the 1970s—would be very costly. The structure gauge of the tunnels prevents the use of double-deck carriages.

=== Proposed connection to Cologne–Frankfurt high-speed railway ===
The option of the Cologne–Groß-Gerau high-speed railway project planned in the 1970s for an east of the Rhine railway between Limburg and Diez would have connected with the Lahn Valley Railway at a two-level station. During the planning for the Cologne–Frankfurt high-speed railway, there were also considerations of connecting with the Lahn Valley Railway between the stations of Limburg (Lahn) and Eschhofen at a two-level station, but they failed for cost reasons.

=== Future upgrades ===
The stations of Albshausen and Stockhausen are to be comprehensively rehabilitated in the future by means of a subsidies provided by the state of Hesse.

== Passengers ==
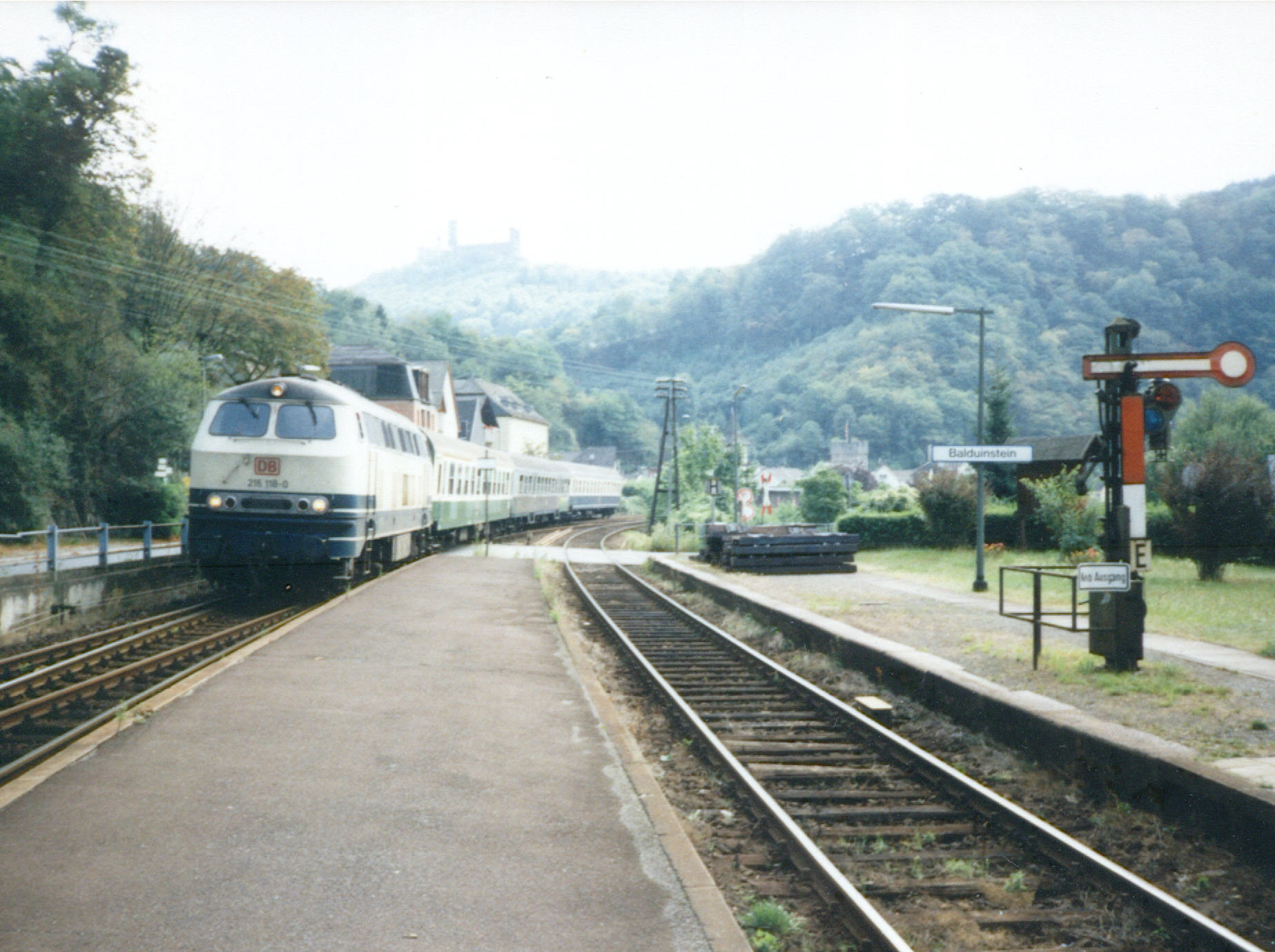
Regionalbahn service to Gießen in Balduinstein station (August 1997)

Until the late 1970s, there were long-distance trains on the Lahn Valley Railway, including a pair of express trains to and from Trier to Westerland. Some timetables had an express train on the Paris–Trier–Koblenz route, continuing on the Lahn valley line to Gießen. The Dortmund–Bad Ems through coach of the Koblenz–Limburg–Frankfurt express, which had been very popular with spa guests had been discontinued. The Koblenz–Gießen express was extended several times a day via the Vogelsberg Railway to Fulda. A curiosity was the Frankfurt–Cologne express, which ran between Weilburg and Limburg on the Lahn Valley Railway only on workdays and only in one direction.

The traffic on the Lahn Valley Railway was a mixture of locomotive-hauled trains and diesel multiple units. The locomotive-hauled trains were mainly used for commuter and school services and were mainly operated with rebuilt carriages and express train carriages of class E 30, which were hauled by diesel locomotives of class 211 up to the 1980s, and later also by class 216 locomotives. Silberling cars were only occasionally operated up to 1990.

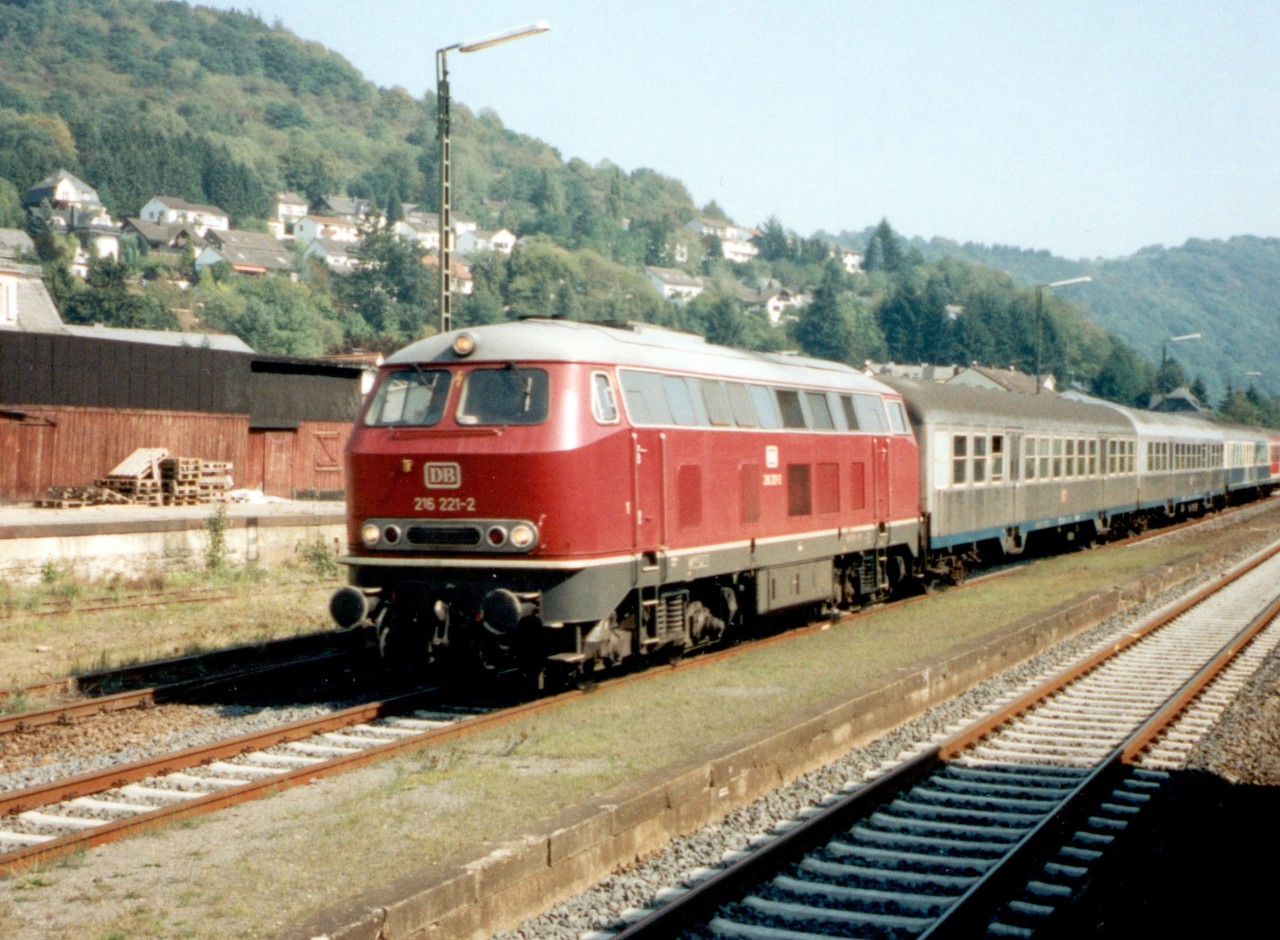
Regionalbahn service to Koblenz in Nassau (Lahn) station (September 1998)

Express trains were usually formed with class V 200 locomotives and "standard carriages" (UIC-X-Wagen). At the end of the 1980s, the picture changed with the arrival of new class 628 DMUs, which eventually displaced many DMUs and locomotive-hauled trains. The latter services continued until December 2004, initially for many years with class 212 and 216 locomotives, which were from 1998 onwards replaced by class 215s, which were in turn replaced in December 2002 with class 218s. The trains initially consisted of standard carriages, and were later formed increasingly from Silberling carriages. With the use of the class 215 and 218 sets, the locomotive-hauled trains were finally converted to push-pull operations, which until then had been used very rarely in the Lahn valley.

Except for commuter and school services, the passenger trains were predominantly operated with railcars and DMUs. For a long time, the Lahn Valley Railway was a focus for the operation of accumulator railcars of classes ETA 176 and ETA 150 sets with up to four cars. The Uerdingen railbus was also used in various versions. However, from 1987, these vehicles were quickly replaced by new class 628 diesel locomotives, which also displaced some of the locomotive-hauled trains. This would not change until December 2004.

The operation of class 611 sets equipped with tilting on a continuous Regional-Express service commenced for a few months from about 1997. Due to technical difficulties, these multiple units had to be withdrawn from circulation and reworked several times. They were replaced by trains hauled by class 216 locomotives, some with locomotives at both ends to keep the short turnaround times in the terminal stations and to reduce delays.

Until the change of the timetable in 2006/2007, a Vectus railcar operated as an RB service between Limburg and Gießen. After the 2006/2007 timetable change, there were separate Vectus DMU services between Limburg and Gießen: from Monday to Friday in the evening two Regionalbahn train pairs were operated by Vectus between Limburg and Giessen; several services also operated at the weekend. These trips were used to transport the Vectus vehicles to the DB Regio carriage-washing facility in Giessen. These trips have not operated since the takeover of the Limburg–Giessen section by the HLB in December 2011.

Since the timetable change in December 2008, Regional-Express services have been provided by class 612 DMUs with active tilting technology, which allowed travel times between Limburg and Gießen to be shortened by about eleven minutes. Since the end of October 2009, two incidents in relation to the tilting system led to it being switched off, delaying trains by about 10 to 15 minutes. After the timetable change in December 2010, the Regional-Express trains were again operated with active tilt technology.

=== Current services ===
As a result of the 2006/2007 timetable change in December 2006 and the associated cost-cutting measures in the regional transport sector, there were considerable cuts in services on the line at the beginning and end of the day. Therefore, a supplementary service was provided by regular buses (route 282) between Limburg and Weilburg. However, the buses took much longer than the trains. On the eastern section between Wetzlar and Weilburg daily (Monday to Saturday), bus route 125 ran from Weilburg (departing at 3.56 am or 5.26 am on Saturdays) to Wetzlar, giving early connections to Gießen and Frankfurt. In the opposite direction, bus route 125 also ran daily (Monday to Saturday) in the evening from Wetzlar (departing at 10:27 pm) to Weilburg and on Saturdays to Stockhausen.

Since the 2011/2012 timetable change on 11 December 2011, the (Fulda–Alsfeld–)Gießen–Limburg services (RB 25) has been operated by HLB. In this case, Alstom Coradia LINT 41 (class 648) sets are used and Siemens Desiro Classic (class 642) sets are operated as additional trains in the peak on the Weilburg–Gießen–Grünberg route. In addition, trains on the Lahn Valley Railway now stop again in Dutenhofen, which they previously passed without stopping. The RB services run mostly hourly from Monday to Friday, half-hourly in peak periods, and on the weekend services run every two hours.

Designation	Route	Comments	Rolling stock	Operator
RE 25	Koblenz – Limburg – Weilburg – Wetzlar – Gießen	Every 120 minutes	Bombardier Talent, Alstom Coradia LINT 27/41	DB Regio Südwest
RE 24	Weilburg – Wetzlar – Gießen	Every 120 minutes	Alstom Coradia LINT 41	Hessische Landesbahn
RB 23	Mayen Ost – Mendig – Andernach – Koblenz – Nassau – Bad Ems – Limburg	Every 60 minutes (plus additional peak services, two trains starting from Kaisersesch)	Bombardier Talent, Alstom Coradia LINT 27/41	DB Regio Südwest
RB 45	Limburg – Weilburg – Wetzlar – Gießen – Alsfeld – Fulda	Every 60 minutes (plus additional peak services)	Alstom Coradia LINT 41, Siemens Desiro Classic (rarely)	Hessische Landesbahn

== Transport associations ==
The line is located in the area of the transport association Verkehrsverbund Rhein-Mosel (VRM) between Koblenz and Diez and in the area of the transport association Rhein-Main-Verkehrsverbund (RMV) between Limburg (Lahn) and Wetzlar. Additionally, the VRM fares applies for rides coming from the VRM area up to Limburg as well as up to Elz Süd (RB29) and Wilsenroth (RB90) and backwards.

== Freight ==
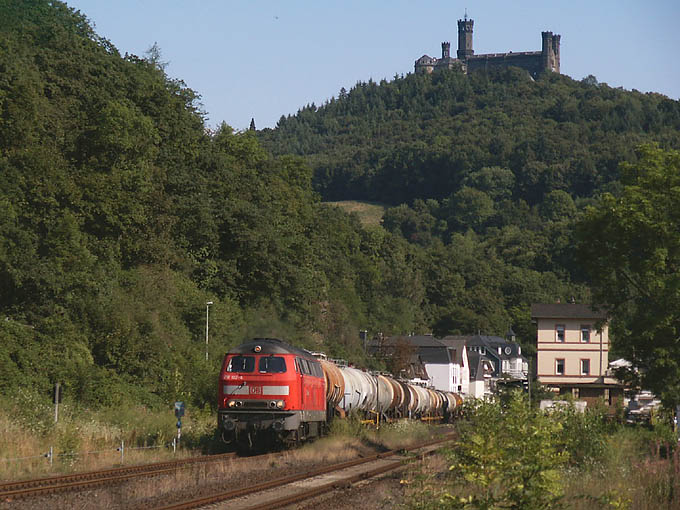
216 102 with the weekly tanker train in Balduinstein, 2003.

Since the decline of mining in the Lahn valley there has been little freight on the line. Up to the 1990s regular freight traffic gradually came to a standstill. The Löhnberg–Wetzlar section for many years had no freight. Many goods yards and the extensive system of track that existed before the turn of the century were largely eliminated.

The situation has changed since the 1980s as all trains for the transport of clay mined in the Westerwald and bound for Italy have since the closure of the Brexbach Valley Railway between Engers and Siershahn travelled via Limburg. Loaded clay wagons from the Westerwald are assembled into unit trains in Limburg. These trains then run over the Main-Lahn line to Frankfurt, Mannheim and Basel, mainly continuing to Domodossola in northern Italy. Therefore, Limburg station still has an extensive goods yard. Clay is transported by truck from the mines in the adjacent Westerwald to Löhnberg station, where it is loaded on the Lahn Valley Railway. Thus, Limburg and Löhnberg are the only stations on the Lahn valley line that still handle freight.

== Notes ==
=== Sources ===
- Hager, Bernhard (2006). "Im gesegnetesten Theil des reizendschönen Landes". Eisenbahn-Geschichte (in German) (17): 24–37. ISSN 1611-6283.
- Fuchs, Konrad (1956). "Eisenbahnprojekte und Eisenbahnbau am Mittelrhein 1836–1903". Nassauische Annalen (in German) (67): 158–202.
- Kandler, Udo (2007). Dieselbetrieb im Lahntal - Von den achtziger Jahren bis heute (in German). Freiburg: Eisenbahn-Bildarchiv, EK-Verlag. ISBN 978-3-88255-368-0.
- Kandler, Udo (1989). "Lahntalbahn". Eisenbahn-Journal Sonderausgabe (in German). 89 (III). Fürstenfeldbruck: Hermann Merker Verlag. ISSN 0720-051X.
- Schomann, Heinz (2005). Eisenbahn in Hessen. Eisenbahnbauten- und strecken 1839–1939 (in German). Stuttgart: Theiss Verlag. pp. 276 ff (line 017). ISBN 3-8062-1917-6. (=Landesamt für Denkmalpflege Hessen (ed.). Eisenbahn in Hessen. Eisenbahnenbauten- und strecken 1839–1939. Vol. 2.)
- Seyferth, Joachim (2006). Die Lahntalbahn (Schiene-Photo Band 7) (in German). Wiesbaden: Schiene Verlag. ISBN 3-926669-07-1.
- Spieß, August. Das Lahntal von seinem Ursprung bis zur Ausmündung nebst seiner nächsten Umgebung. (in German). Dillenburg 1866: L. J. Kirchberger.
- Atzbach, Gregor (2014). Lahntalbahn, eine Reise von Gießen nach Koblenz (in German). ISBN 978-94-6254-740-7.
