= Bad Ems station =

Railway station in Bad Ems, Germany

Bad Ems
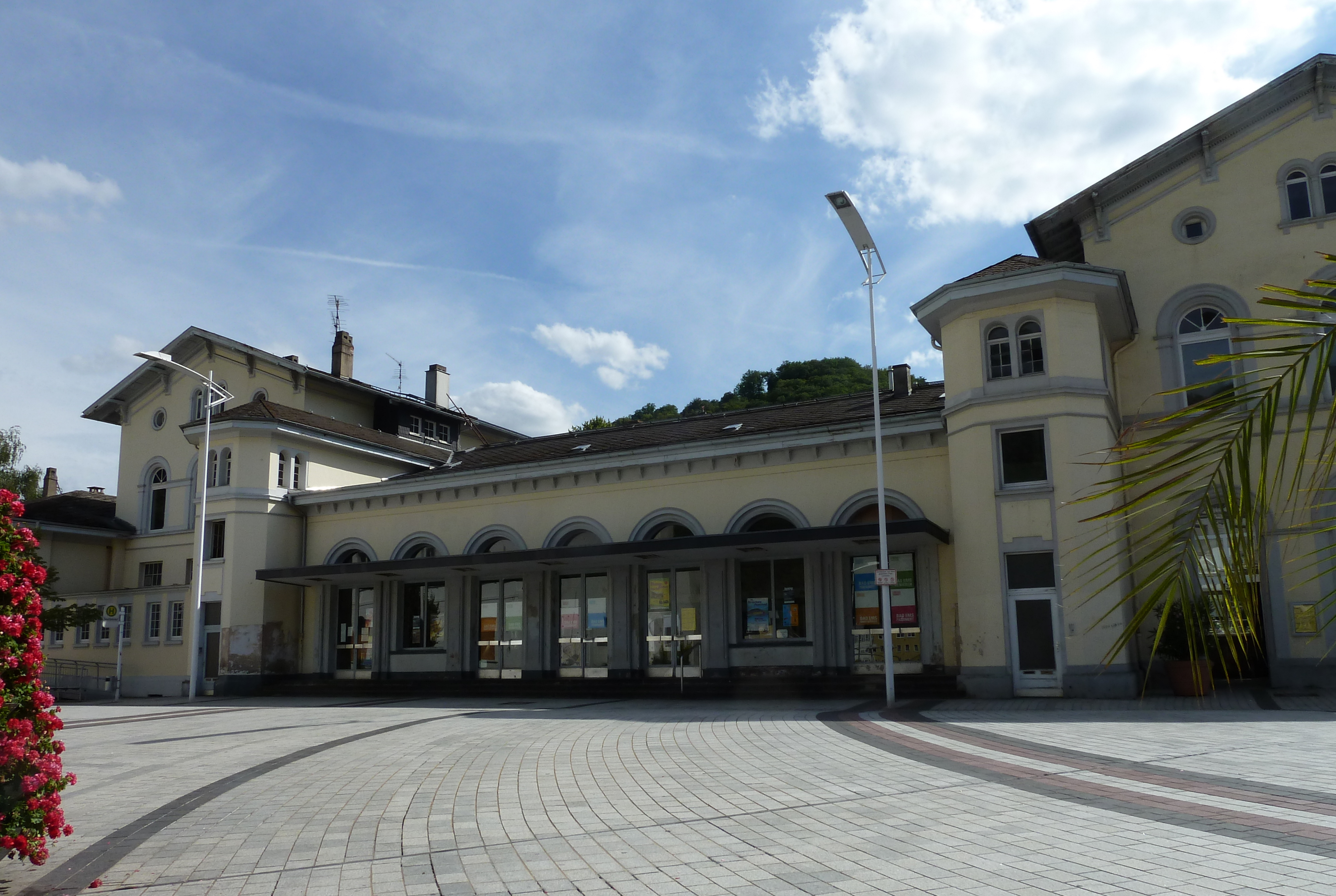
- Station forecourt and station building

General information
- Location: Bahnhofsplatz 1, Bad Ems, Rhineland-Palatinate; Germany
- Coordinates: 50°19′39″N 7°43′43″E
- Line: Lahntal railway (km 86.4) (625)
- Platforms: 2

Construction
- Accessible: Yes
- Architect: Heinrich Velde
- Architectural style: Gothic Revival

Other information
- Station code: 271
- DS100 code: FEMS
- IBNR: 80000701
- Category: 5
- Fare zone: VRM: 503
- Website: www.bahnhof.de

History
- Opened: 1 July 1858

Services
Preceding station	DB Regio Mitte	Following station
Niederlahnstein towards Koblenz Hbf	RE 25	Nassau (Lahn) towards Gießen
Bad Ems West towards Mayen Ost	RB 23	Dausenau towards Limburg (Lahn)
Location

Bad Ems is a station in the town of Bad Ems in the German state of Rhineland-Palatinate. It is on the Lahntal railway (Koblenz–Wetzlar). The entrance building is heritage-listed.

== Construction ==
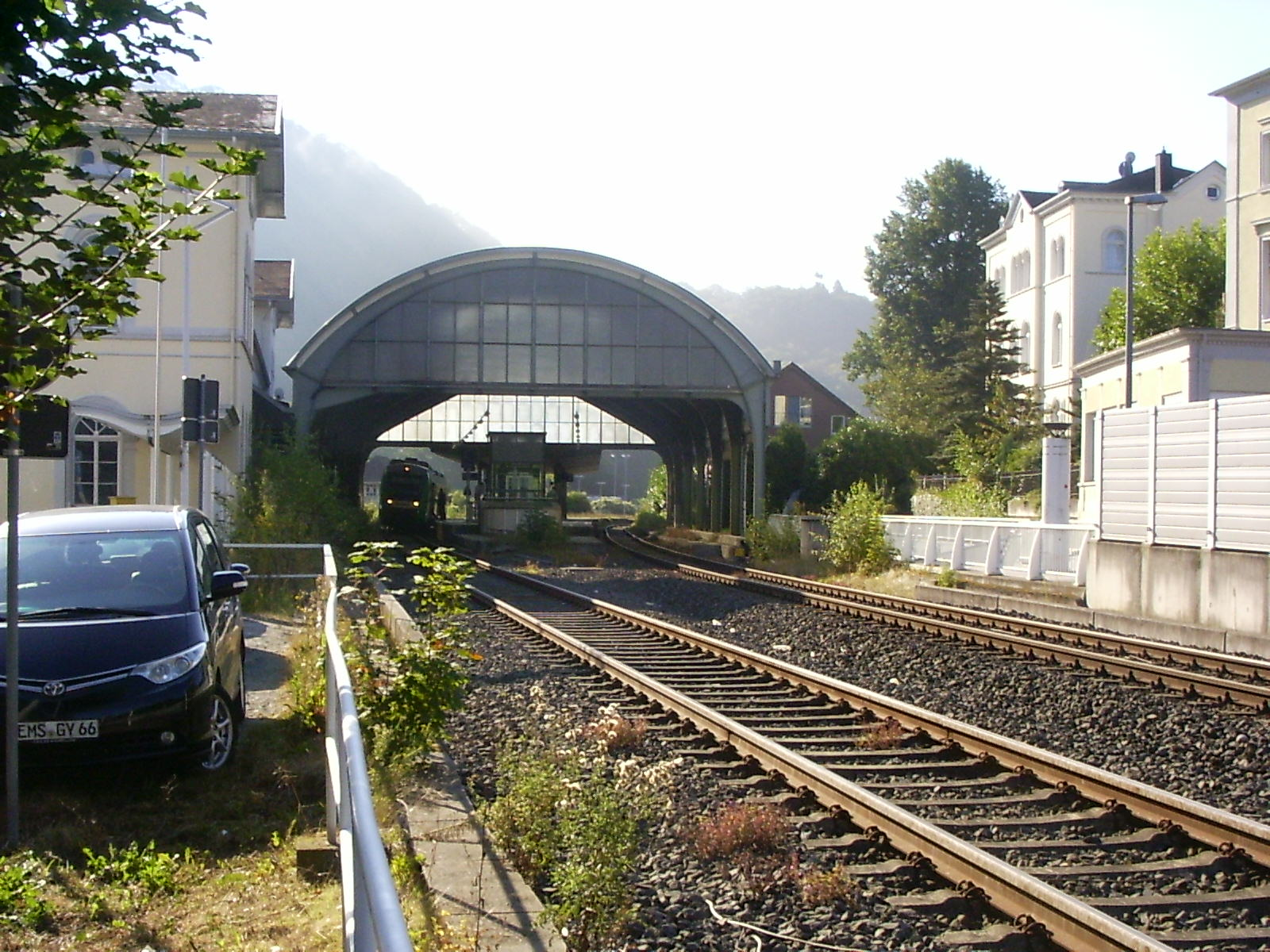
View of the train shed

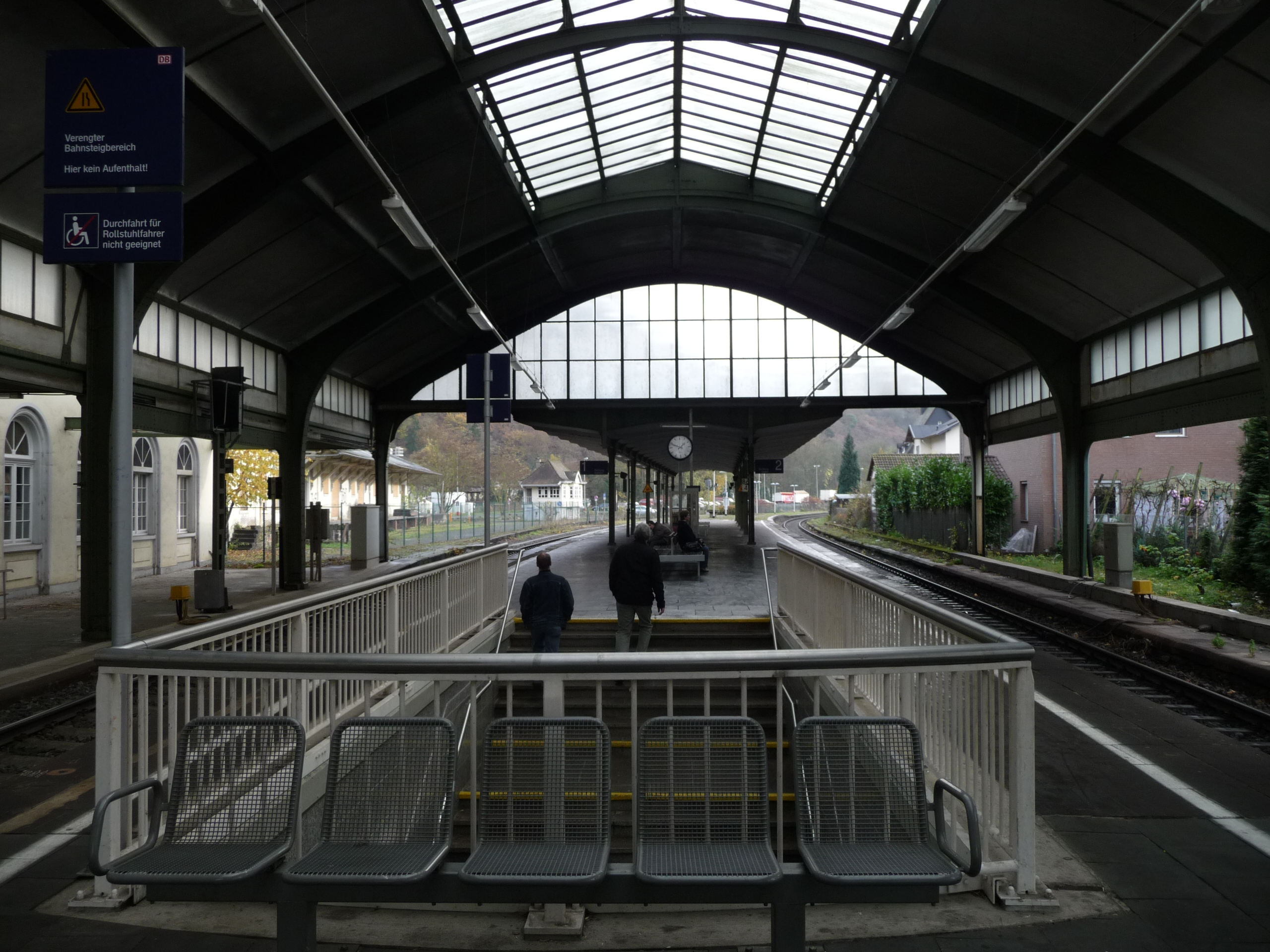
Train shed with platforms

The station has an entrance hall, an extension formerly used as a Fürstenbahnhof ("Princes' station", that it was built to be used by royalty) and a train shed built by MAN in 1910; which is the smallest train shed in the DB network. It was built because of the great importance of Bad Ems as a spa before the First World War. The ensemble is given heritage protection as a cultural monument.

A pedestrian subway, which was built later, connects the entrance building with the island platform and Braubacher Straße (L 327) on the other side of the station. The entrance is equipped with a wheelchair ramp. An extension to the station building contains remains of paintings on the ceiling. This contains stairs and a lift connecting with the subway to the platform and to Braubacher Straße.

In the meantime the station was classified as a Haltepunkt (halt). Station points were installed and the signals were renewed in August 2015 to allow more trains to pass over the Lahntal railway during the busiest periods. The installation of points meant that it was reclassified from a halt to a station.

=== Tracks ===
The station has a platform with two platform tracks:

- track 1 (length: 277 metre; height: 34/55 cm): trains to Koblenz Hauptbahnhof
- track 2 (length: 272 metre; height: 34/55 cm): trains to Limburg (Lahn) and Gießen

== Connections ==
=== Trains ===
The following services stop in Bad Ems station:

Line	Route	Frequency
RE 25 Lahn-Eifel-Bahn	Koblenz Hbf – Bad Ems – Nassau (Lahn) – Diez – Limburg (Lahn) – Weilburg – Wetzlar – Gießen	Every 2 hours
RB 23 Lahn-Eifel-Bahn	Mayen Ost – Mendig – Koblenz Stadtmitte – Koblenz Hbf – Bad Ems – Nassau (Lahn) – Diez – Limburg (Lahn)	Hourly (+ extra trains in peak hour)

=== Buses ===
The following bus routes stop at the nearest bus stop, called Bad Ems Hauptbahnhof:

- 456: Bad Ems–Welschneudorf–Montabaur
- 547: Bad Ems town route
- 557: Bad Ems–Arzbach–Neuhäusel(–Koblenz)
