= Lahn-Eifel-Bahn =

German rail service

RB 23 RE 25 RB 38 Lahn-Eifel-Bahn
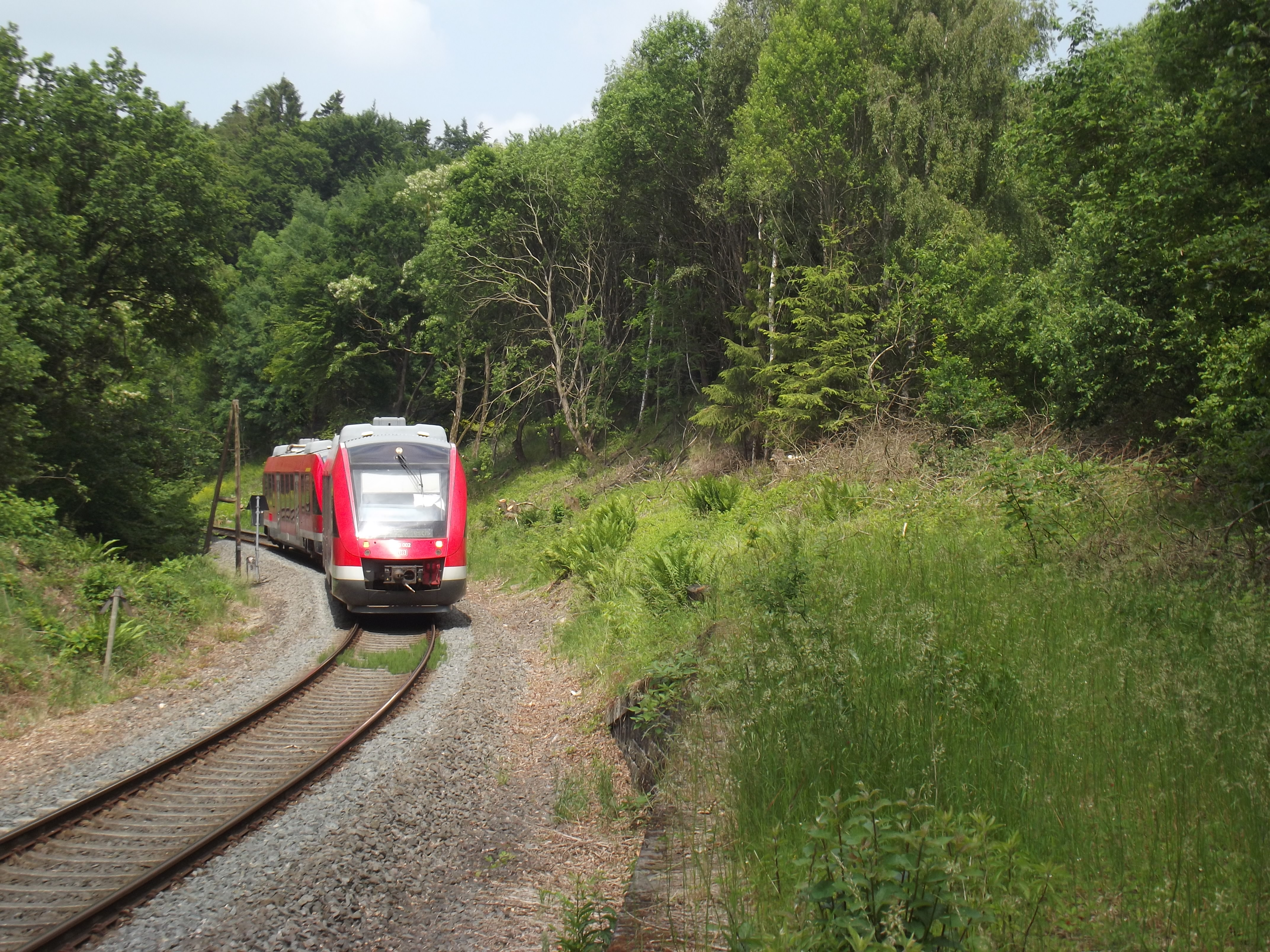
- LINT 27 double set as RB 38 near Kaisersesch

Overview
- Locale: Rhineland-Palatinate and Hesse, Germany

Service
- Route number: 478 (Kaisersesch–Andernach); 470 (Andernach-Koblenz); 625 (Koblenz-Gießen)
- Operator: DB Regio Südwest

Technical
- Line length: 177 km (110 mi)
- Operating speed: 120 km/h (75 mph) (maximum)

Lahn-Eifel-Bahn logo

The Lahn-Eifel-Bahn is a rail passenger service in the German states of Rhineland-Palatinate and Hesse that runs as the RB 23 from Limburg an der Lahn via Koblenz and Andernach to Mayen, as RE 25 from Gießen via Limburg to Koblenz and as RB 38 from Andernach via Mayen to Kaisersesch.

It runs over the Lahntal railway, the West Rhine railway and the Cross Eifel Railway.

It was created with the introduction of the Rhineland-Palatinate integrated timetable of 2015 at the timetable change in December 2014 by linking the Lahntalbahn (a service that ran on the Lahntal railway) with the Pellenz-Eifel-Bahn (a service that ran mainly on the Cross Eifel Railway) services. The main advantage of this concept is that, for the places along the Pellenz-Eifel route to Mayen, it made possible a connection to central Koblenz without changing trains and at the same time the trains on the Lahntal railway could reach Koblenz-Stadtmitte.

The contract to operate the Lahn-Eifel-Bahn was awarded at part of Lot 1 of the Eifel-Westerwald-Sieg diesel network to DB Regio Südwest. The contract runs until December 2030.

== RB 23 ==
=== Limburg–Koblenz section ===
The RB 23 services on this section generally run hourly and starts at Limburg at 45 minutes past the hour.

From Mondays to Fridays the first trip starts at 4:45, on Saturdays at 5:45 and Sundays at 6:45. The hourly services end at 20:45, but there is another service at 22:45 and on Fridays and Saturdays at 23:45.

From Mondays to Fridays, the service is reinforced in the holiday season by journeys at 5:15, 6:15, 6:28, 7:15 and 13:15 from Limburg.

Initially, many of these services ended at Koblenz Hauptbahnhof. The services that reached Koblenz around 5:50 and 7:19 continued to Andernach. The services that reached Koblenz around 7:50, 9:50, 11:50, 13:50, 15:50, 17:50, 19:50 and 21:50 continued to Mayen Ost. Due to problems with the platform occupancy in Koblenz Hauptbahnhof, it was not possible until December 2016 for all the trains of the Lahntal railway to continue to Andernach.

=== Koblenz-Mayen section ===
The RB 23 services on this section generally run hourly and start in Koblenz Hauptbahnhof at 52 minutes past the hour.

The first service begins at 7:52 in Koblenz at the last at 21:52, but on Fridays and Sundays there is an additional service at around 23:52 from Koblenz. From Mondays to Fridays there is also a service at 5:52 and a service from Monday to Saturday at 7:21, both from Koblenz and ending in Andernach.

Due to school traffic, the daily service from Koblenz at 12:52 also ends in Andernach.

=== Mayen–Koblenz section ===
The RB 23 in this section generally runs hourly and starts in Mayen Ost at 18 minutes past the hour.

The first trip begins in Mayen Ost on Mondays to Saturdays at 5:18 and on Sundays at 6:18. The last trip starts daily at 21:18. The last journey from Andernach towards Limburg (Lahn) starts on Sundays to Fridays at 22:50.

Unlike the trips in the other direction all services run to Limburg.

=== Koblenz–Limburg section ===
The RB 23 in this section generally runs hourly and starts in Koblenz Hauptbahnhof at 9 minutes past the hour.

From Mondays to Fridays the first service runs at 5:09, on Saturdays at 6:09 and on Sundays at 7:09. The last service generally runs at 22:09. Afterwards there is still one daily service except on Saturdays running from Andernach 23:10, as well as one on Saturdays and Sundays starting in Koblenz Hauptbahnhof at 0:09.

From Mondays to Fridays, the service is changed in the holiday season with journeys starting at 13:39, 16:36, 17:36 and 18:37 from Koblenz Hauptbahnhof.

In addition, since December 2015 there are two pairs of trains, which run only to Bad Ems. These trains then return to Koblenz. With these trains, the regular RE 25 and the RB 23 services and additional Koblenz–Limburg services that run in the peak, there are two services per hour between Koblenz and Bad Ems between 12:00 and 18:00.

== RE 25 ==
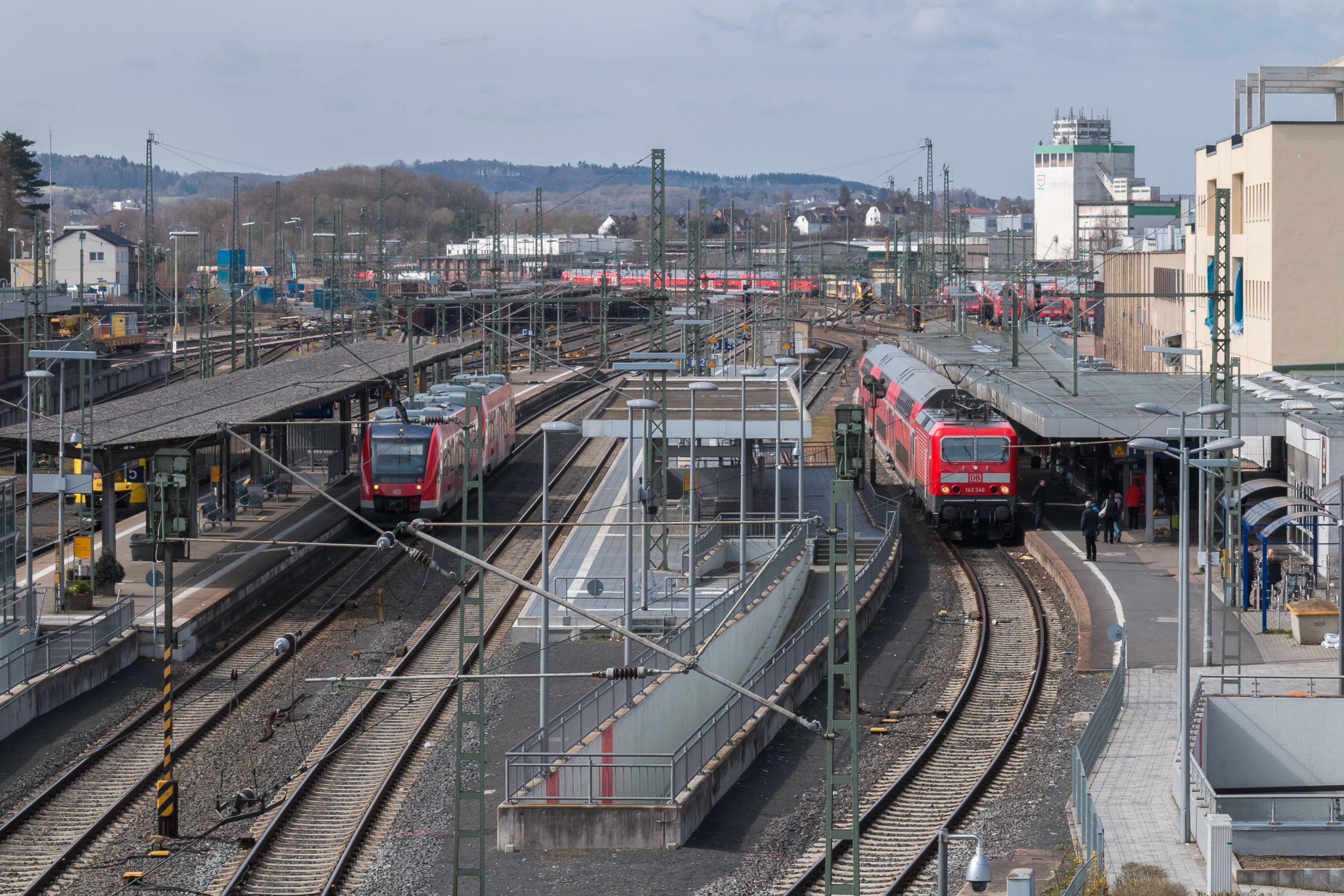
LINT 27 double set as the Lahntalexpress (RE 25) towards Gießen in Limburg (Lahn) station

Since the introduction of the Lahn-Eifel-Bahn, the former Lahntalexpress (RE 25) from Koblenz Hauptbahnhof to Gießen also runs under this name. These trains run daily at two-hour intervals and also stop at Niederlahnstein, Bad Ems, Nassau (Lahn), Diez, Limburg (Lahn), Weilburg and Wetzlar.

These services run hourly, starting in Koblenz Hauptbahnhof at 58 minutes past the hour. The first departure takes place daily at 6:58 and the last at 18:58.

In Limburg (Lahn), there is a connection on Mondays to Fridays to RE 20 as well as a daily connection from RB 22 from Frankfurt. In Gießen, it connects with the HLB service (RE 98/99, Main-Sieg-Express) towards Frankfurt, Siegen and Marburg.

The departures from Giessen take place on odd hours at 16 minutes past the hour on Mondays to Saturdays between 7:16 and 21:16 and on Sundays between 9:16 and 21:16.

=== Criticism ===
Before the timetable change in December 2014, the Lahntalexpress was operated with class 612 sets with active tilting. These trains ran faster through the winding Lahn valley.

The trains used now do not have tilting and are slower. Although they no longer stop in Eschhofen, trains depart Koblenz Hauptbahnhof six minutes earlier, which means there is less time available for transfers. Due to the reduced acceleration of the trains, delays cannot be made up any more. At the start of the operation, there were some irregularities in the operation of the rolling stock, so trains had too little capacity or were late.

== RB 38 ==
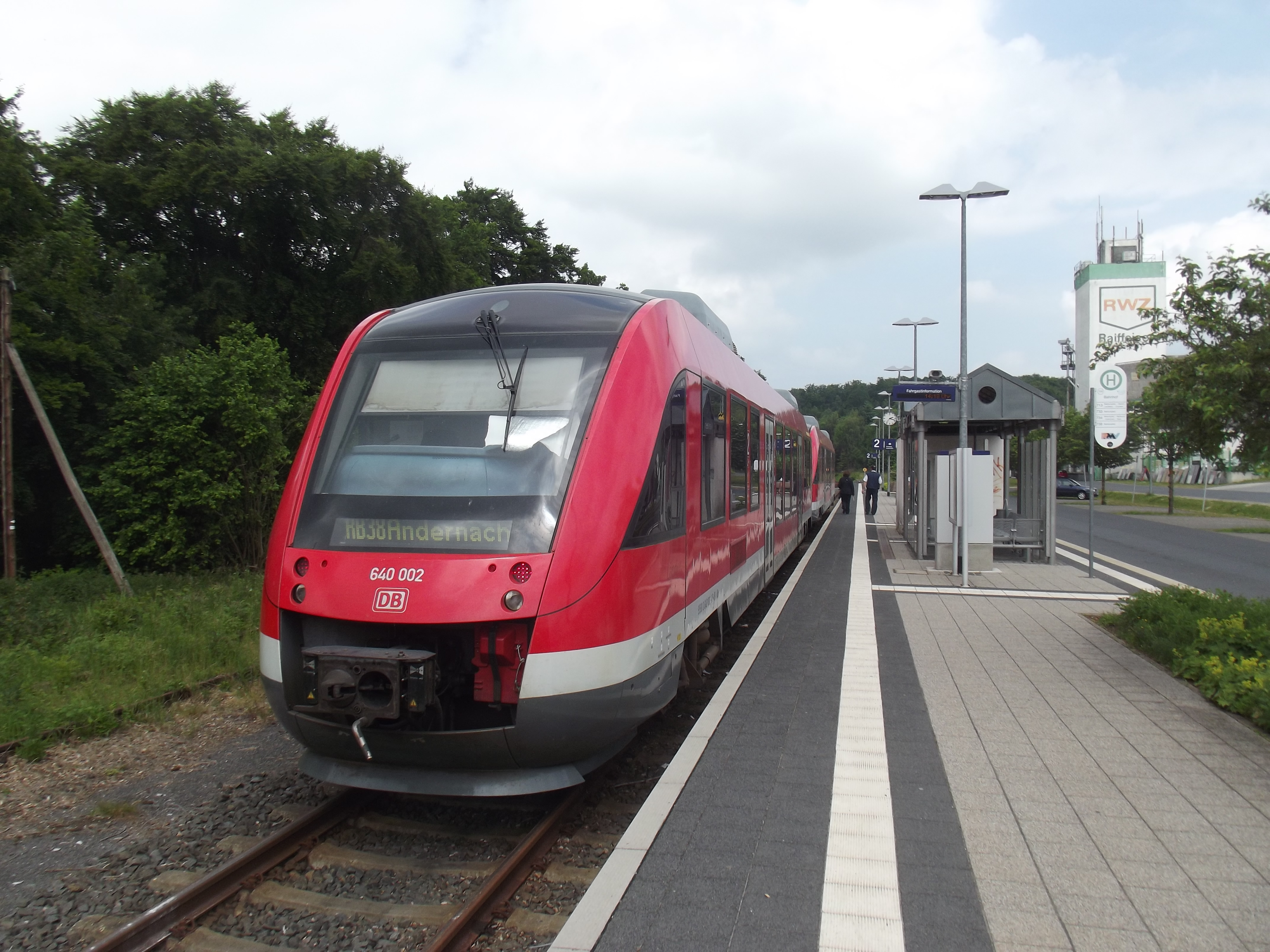
LINT 27 double set as RB 38 in Kaisersesch

Each day, the RB 38 runs hourly between 8:28 and 12:28 and between 14:36 and 21:36 from Kaisersesch to Andernach, with the last service of the day ending in Mayen Ost.

From Mayen Ost there are trains running from Monday to Friday from 4:55 to 6:56 and from Mayen West daily at 7:48 and 13:34.

The services start in Andernach each day at 7:29 and hourly between 8:27 and 12:27 and between 13:35 and 22:35.

== Rolling stock ==
The Lahn-Eifel-Bahn is operated by DB Regio Südwest with diesel multiple units of class 640 (Alstom Coradia LINT 27), 643 (Bombardier Talent) and 648 (LINT 41).

Before the timetable change, rolling stock of class 640 and 648 operated on the network of the DreiLänderBahn and were stationed in Siegen. Talent railcars, which were made available by DB Regio NRW, were also used.

Trains usually run as single sets in normal operation. In the peak hour some trips are also operated as double sets. The class 640 vehicles often operate as double sets in normal operations.

== Fares ==
Between Kaisersesch and Diez the fares of the Verkehrsverbund Rhein-Mosel (Rhine-Mosel Transport Association, VRM) apply. The Länderticket for Rhineland-Palatinate, which is called the Rheinland-Pfalz Ticket, and the Rheinland-Pfalz Ticket + Luxemburg apply as far as Limburg, as well as when changing to the trains of the Limburg-Staffel–Siershahn railway or the Limburg–Altenkirchen railway as far as Elz Süd and Wilsenroth in Hesse.

Between Limburg and Gießen the fare of the Rhein-Main-Verkehrsverbund (RMV) applies, the Hessenticket is valid as well.

The Quer-durchs-Land-Ticket can be used on the whole Lahn-Eifel-Bahn.

== See also ==
- DreiLänderBahn
- Rhein-Sieg-Express
- Rhein-Express
