= Koblenz Hauptbahnhof =

Railway station in Koblenz, Germany

Koblenz Hbf
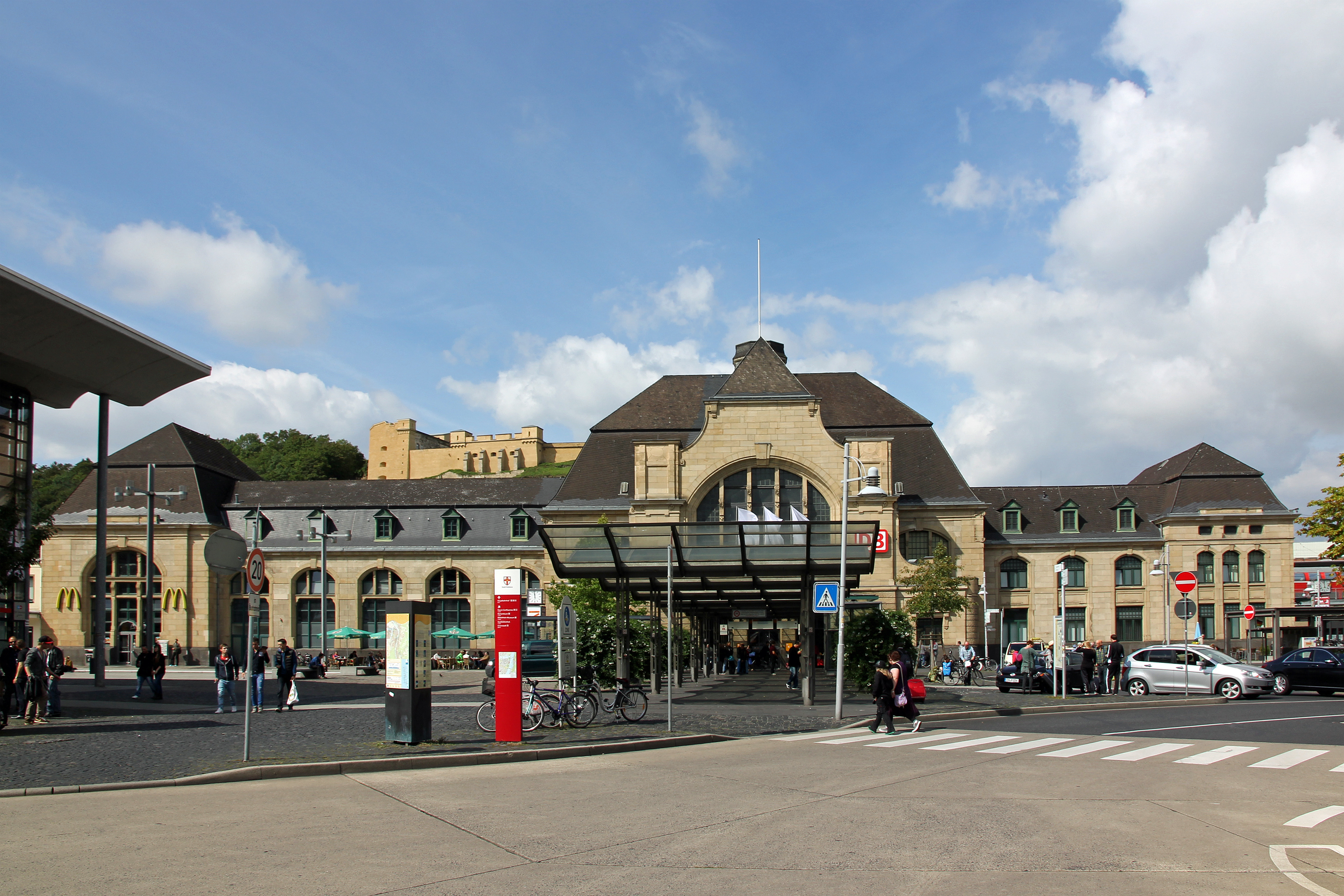
- Station building and station forecourt

General information
- Location: Bahnhofsplatz 2, Koblenz, Rhineland-Palatinate; Germany
- Coordinates: 50°21′2.76″N 7°35′21.63″E
- Lines: West Rhine Railway; Moselle line; Lahntal railway; (East Rhine Railway – via Lahntal railway)
- Platforms: 10

Construction
- Accessible: Yes
- Architect: Fritz Klingholz
- Architectural style: Baroque Revival

Other information
- Station code: 3299
- DS100 code: KKO
- IBNR: 8000206
- Category: 2
- Fare zone: VRM: 101
- Website: www.bahnhof.de

History
- Opened: 1 May 1902

Passengers
- 40,000
Services
Preceding station	DB Fernverkehr	Following station
Bonn Hbf towards Hamburg-Altona	ICE 1 Sprinter	Bingen (Rhein) Hbf towards Passau Hbf
Andernach towards Berlin Ostbahnhof	ICE 19	Terminus
Andernach towards Emden Hbf	IC 35	Terminus
Andernach towards Düsseldorf Hbf	IC 37	Kobern-Gondorf towards Luxemburg|Luxemburg
Bonn Hbf towards Dresden Hbf	IC 55	Mainz Hbf towards Stuttgart Hbf
Bonn Hbf towards Dortmund Hbf	IC 55 Allgäu	Mainz Hbf towards Oberstdorf
Bonn Hbf towards Dortmund Hbf	ICE 91	Mainz Hbf towards Wien Hbf
Preceding station	DB Regio NRW	Following station
Koblenz Stadtmitte towards Mönchengladbach Hbf	RE 8	Terminus
Koblenz-Ehrenbreitstein towards Mönchengladbach Hbf	RB 27	Terminus
Preceding station	DB Regio Mitte	Following station
Terminus	RE 1 Südwest-Express	Kobern-Gondorf towards Heidelberg Hbf
Terminus	RE 2 Südwest-Express	Boppard Hbf towards Frankfurt (Main) Hbf
Terminus	RE 25	Niederlahnstein towards Gießen
Koblenz Stadtmitte towards Mayen Ost	RB 23	Niederlahnstein towards Limburg (Lahn)
Koblenz-Moselweiß towards Trier Hbf	RB 81	Terminus
Preceding station	National Express Germany	Following station
Koblenz Stadtmitte towards Wesel	RE 5 (Rhein-Express)	Terminus
Preceding station	Vlexx	Following station
Terminus	RE 17	Boppard Hbf towards Kaiserslautern Hbf
Preceding station	VIAS	Following station
Koblenz Stadtmitte towards Neuwied	RB 10	Niederlahnstein towards Frankfurt (Main) Hbf
Preceding station	Trans Regio	Following station
Koblenz Stadtmitte towards Köln Messe/Deutz	RB 26	Rhens towards Mainz Hbf
Location

Koblenz Hauptbahnhof is a railway station in the city of Koblenz in the German state of Rhineland-Palatinate. It is the focal point of rail transport in the Rhine-Moselle-Lahn area. It is a through station in southern Koblenz built below Fort Großfürst Konstantin and opened in 1902 in the Neustadt (new city), which was built after the demolition of the city walls in 1890. The station replaced two former stations on the Left Rhine railway, which were only 900 m (3,000 ft) apart, and the former Moselle line station. Koblenz-Stadtmitte station opened in April 2011 in the old centre of Koblenz. Koblenz Hauptbahnhof is on the West Rhine Railway and connects to the Moselle line, the East Rhine Railway and to the Lahntal railway. It is used daily by about 40,000 travelers and visitors. In the station forecourt are a bus station and a pavilion.

Since 2002, the station has been part of the Upper Middle Rhine Valley UNESCO World Heritage site.

== History ==
=== Rhenish railway station ===
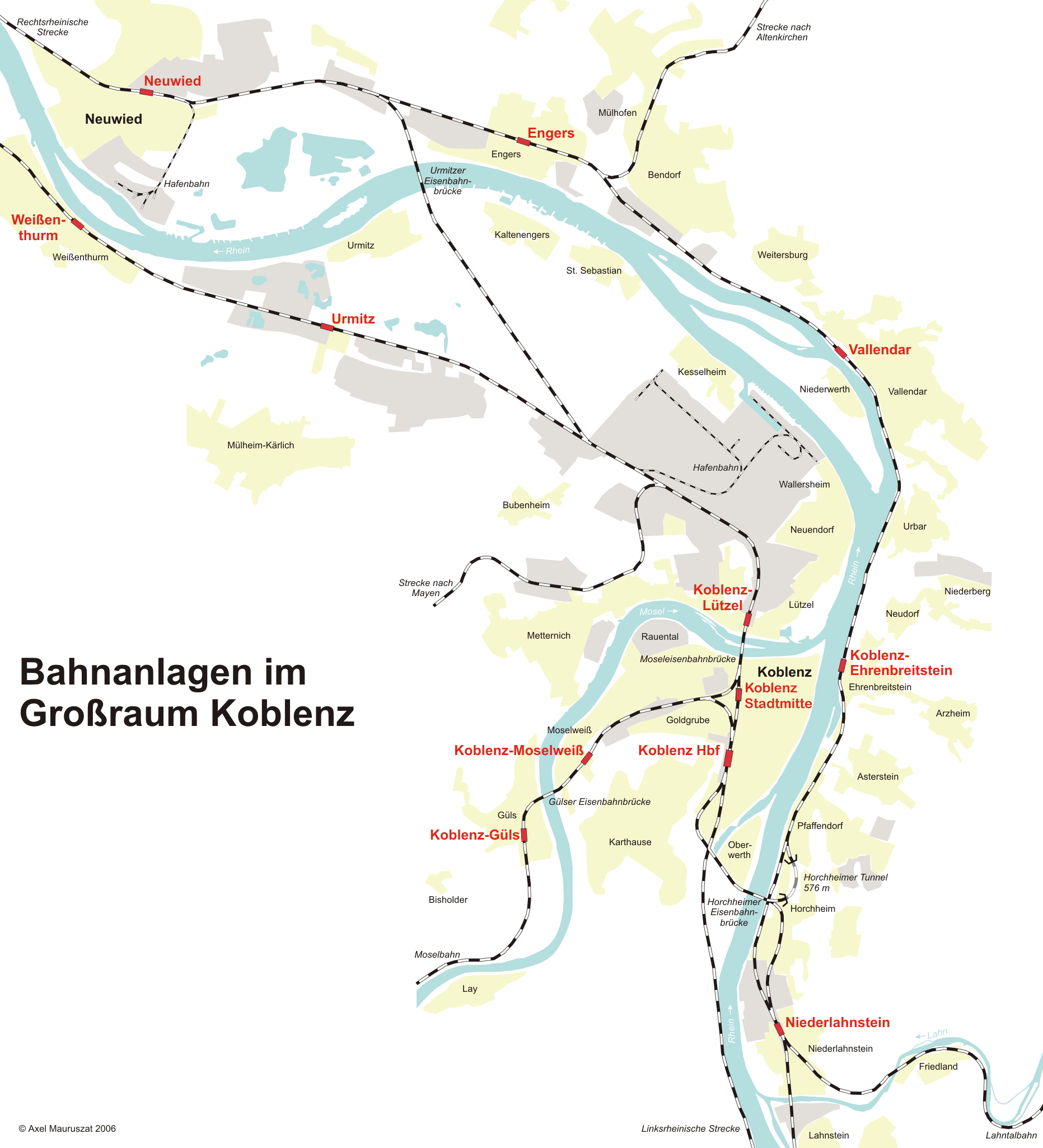
Map of railway lines in the Koblenz area

The Bonn-Cologne Railway Company opened its line between Cologne and Bonn in 1844, and extended it to Rolandseck in 1856. This company was taken over by the Rhenish Railway Company in 1857, which extended the line to Koblenz in 1858. On 11 November 1858, the first train, hauled by the locomotive Windsbraut ("whirlwind") ran over the newly built Moselle railway bridge on the Left Rhine line to a provisional station on Fischelstraße. The construction of the bridge and the line was made possible by the first demolition of the Prussian city walls.

In 1859, the route was extended from Koblenz to Bingerbrück and the Rhenish station was expanded. In 1864 the Pfaffendorf Bridge was opened over the Rhine in Koblenz. It was initially built for trains only, connecting the Left and the Right Rhine lines. The last trains crossed the Pfaffendorf Bridge at the beginning of the First World War in August 1914.

=== Moselle station ===
In October 1878 the Güls railway bridge was inaugurated on the Moselle line and a year later this was followed by the completion of the Horchheim rail bridge over the Rhine. In 1879, the Moselle line was put into operation and its station (Moselbahnhof) was opened below Fort Konstantin, near the modern Hauptbahnhof. This line completed the expansion of the Koblenz rail network and was also a section of the strategic railway line between Berlin and Metz, the so-called Cannons Railway (Kanonenbahn).

=== Construction of the railway station ===
The Prussian fortifications of Koblenz were abandoned and torn down completely from 1890. The built up area of the city spread outside the small area inside the old walls for the first time. South of the walls a new urban area rapidly grew up along with the southern suburbs. The maintenance of two stations proved to be very complicated, because through trains had to stop twice within 900 m (3,000 ft) and passengers coming from Trier and wanting to travel on the right Rhine line to the north had to take a horse-drawn cab or walk between the Moselle and the Rhenish station. Thus demands for a central station became louder and planning started on the construction of a new and larger passenger station.

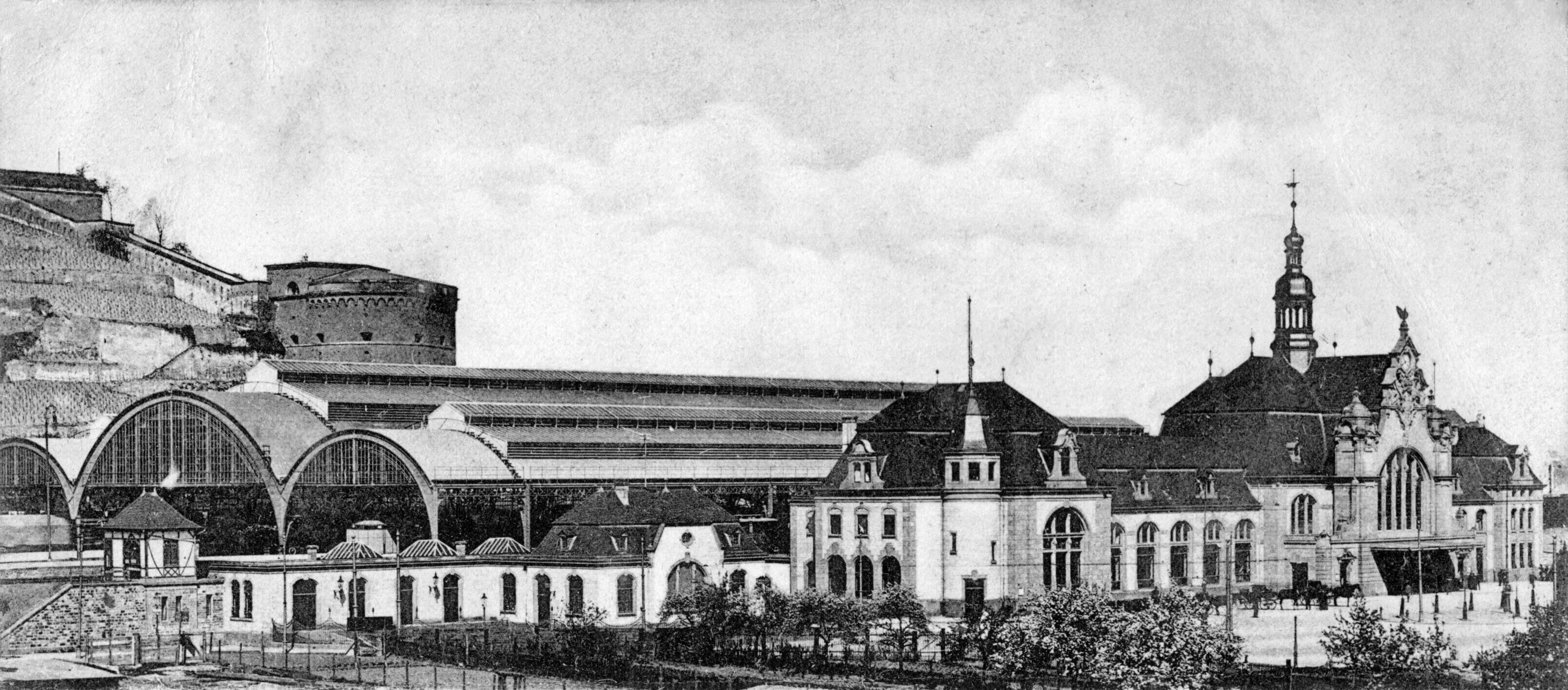
Station building with its original ornamentations and train shed, 1900s

The small Rhenish station on Fischelstraße was abandoned and a magnificent new station was built in the new southern suburbs near the Moselle station from 1899 to 1902 to a design by Fritz Klingholz. The Central Station (Centralbahnhof), as it was officially called at that time, was opened on 1 May 1902. The through station was built like a palace with central and side pavilions, although for functional reasons it was not completely symmetrical. The facades were made of tuff and yellow sandstone in a neo-baroque style. The station building has a length of 96 m. A hall was built over the platforms. The northern wing of the royal room (Fürstenzimmer) was richly decorated and had direct access via a flight of stairs to platform 1, on which the Emperor arrived in Koblenz in 1905.

=== After the Second World War ===
The station building and the railway tracks were damaged in air raids during the Second World War. Reconstruction began in 1946. The station lost the hall structure over its platforms and its tower building. The reconstructions were different from the original buildings, simply built and without ornamentation. Functional roofs were installed over the platforms. In 1957 the Rhine line was electrified. In 1967 a new railway station signal box was opened and in 1977 the lobby was renovated. The travel centre was opened in 1984. In 1998 renovation of the station began and it is still continuing.

== Train services ==
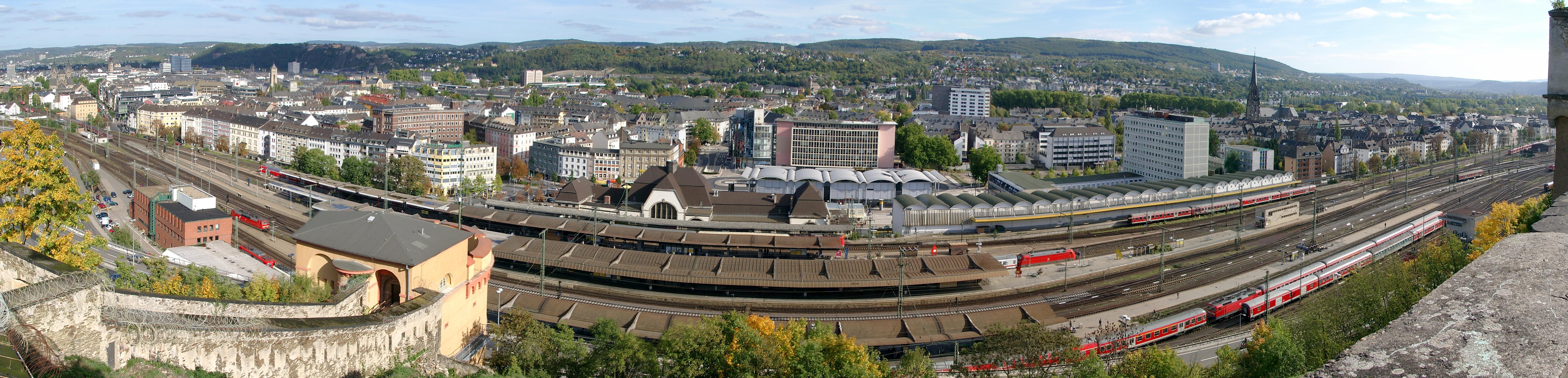
Panorama in 2003

Koblenz station has a total of ten platform tracks on four platforms, seven of which are through-tracks (1 to 5, 8 and 9) and three of which are terminal tracks (104, 105 and 109).

Trains on the Left Rhine line from the north can use almost all tracks (1 to 5, 8 and 104), while Mosel line trains only use the three western tracks (5, 8 and 9). Trains on the Left Rhine line from the south can use only the eastern tracks (1 to 5 and 105), while Lahntal railway and Right Rhine line trains can use all tracks (apart from the northern terminal platform, 104).

In the 2026 timetable, the following services stop at the station:

=== Long distance traffic ===
In long-distance traffic, Koblenz is served by Intercity-Express, Intercity and EuroCity trains. Thus, almost every major city in Germany can be reached directly from Koblenz. Some services on lines 32, 35 and 55 are operated with ICE rolling stock and are therefore considered to be ICE services. In due course, DB intends all IC services to be operated by ICE trains, some limited to 160 km/h, the maximum operating speed of the West Rhine line.

Line	Route	Frequency
ICE 1	Hamburg-Altona – Hamburg – Essen – Duisburg – Düsseldorf – Cologne – Bonn – Koblenz – Mainz – Frankfurt Airport – Frankfurt – Würzburg – Nuremberg – Regensburg – Passau	Two train pairs
ICE 19	Berlin Ostbahnhof – Berlin Hbf – Berlin-Spandau – Hanover – Bielefeld – Hamm – Hagen – Wuppertal – Cologne – Bonn – Koblenz (– Bingen – Mainz – Mannheim – Stuttgart)	3 train pairs
IC 35	Emden – Rheine – Münster – Duisburg – Cologne – Bonn – Andernach – Koblenz	1 train pair
IC 37	Düsseldorf – Cologne – Bonn – Remagen – Andernach – Koblenz – Cochem – Bullay – Wittlich – Trier – Wasserbillig – Luxembourg	1 train pair
ICE 55; IC 55	Dresden – Leipzig – Halle – Magdeburg – Braunschweig – Hanover – Bielefeld – Dortmund – Hagen – Wuppertal – Solingen – Cologne – Bonn – Koblenz – Mainz – Mannheim – Heidelberg – Stuttgart	Every 2 hours
ICE 55; IC 55	Dortmund – Essen – Düsseldorf – Cologne – Bonn – Koblenz – Mainz – Mannheim – Heidelberg – Stuttgart – Ulm – Oberstdorf	1 train pair
ICE 91	Dortmund – Duisburg – Düsseldorf – Cologne – Bonn – Koblenz – Mainz – Frankfurt – Würzburg – Nuremberg – Passau – Linz – Vienna	Every 2 hours

=== Regional services ===
Regional services consist of Regional-Express and Regionalbahn trains to cities within 200 kilometres towards Saarbrücken, Cologne and the Ruhr, Emmerich / Wesel, Giessen and Mainz-Frankfurt am Main. Only 3 of the 12 lines continue through the station, the VIAS-operated RheingauLinie (RB10), the trans regio-operated Mittelrheinbahn (RB26) and the DB Regio-operated Lahn-Eifel-Bahn (RB23); the rest start or finish there.

Line	Line name	Route	Frequency
RE 1	Südwest-Express (SÜWEX)	Koblenz – Treis-Karden – Cochem – Bullay – Wittlich – Trier Hauptbahnhof – Saarburg – Saarbrücken – Homburg – Landstuhl – Kaiserslautern – Neustadt – Ludwigshafen Mitte – Mannheim	Hourly to Homburg or Kaiserslautern, every 2 hours to Mannheim
RE 11	Südwest-Express (SÜWEX)	Koblenz – Treis-Karden – Cochem – Bullay – Wittlich – Trier Hbf – Wasserbillig – Wecker – Munsbach – Sandweiler-Contern – Luxemburg	Hourly
RE 2	Südwest-Express (SÜWEX)	Koblenz – Boppard – Bingen – Mainz – Rüsselsheim – Frankfurt Airport (regional) – Frankfurt	Every 2 hours
RE 5	Rhein-Express	Koblenz – Andernach – Remagen – Bonn – Cologne – Köln Messe/Deutz – Düsseldorf – Duisburg – Wesel	Hourly
RE 8	Rhein-Erft-Express	Koblenz – Koblenz Stadtmitte – Neuwied – Bonn-Beuel – Porz (Rhein) – Köln Messe/Deutz – Cologne – Rommerskirchen – Grevenbroich – Mönchengladbach	Hourly
RB 10	RheingauLinie	Neuwied – Koblenz – Rüdesheim – Wiesbaden – Frankfurt	Hourly
RE 17		Koblenz – Boppard – Oberwesel – Bingen – Bad Kreuznach – Kaiserslautern	120 min
RB 23	Lahn-Eifel-Bahn	Mayen – Mendig – Andernach – Koblenz – Niederlahnstein – Bad Ems – Diez – Limburg (Lahn)	Hourly
RE 25	Lahn-Eifel-Bahn	Koblenz – Limburg – Weilburg – Wetzlar – Gießen	Every 2 hours
RB 26	Mittelrheinbahn	Köln Messe/Deutz – Cologne – Bonn – Remagen – Andernach – Koblenz – Boppard – Oberwesel – Bingen – Ingelheim – Mainz	Hourly
RB 27	Rhein-Erft-Bahn	Koblenz – Koblenz-Ehrenbreitstein – Engers – Neuwied – Bonn-Beuel – Cologne/Bonn Airport – Köln Messe/Deutz – Köln – Rommerskirchen – Grevenbroich – Mönchengladbach	Hourly
RB 81	Moselbahn	Koblenz – Cochem (Mosel) – Bullay – Wittlich – Trier	Hourly

== See also ==
- Rail transport in Germany
- Railway stations in Germany
