= Mendig station =

Railway station in Mendig, Germany

Mendig
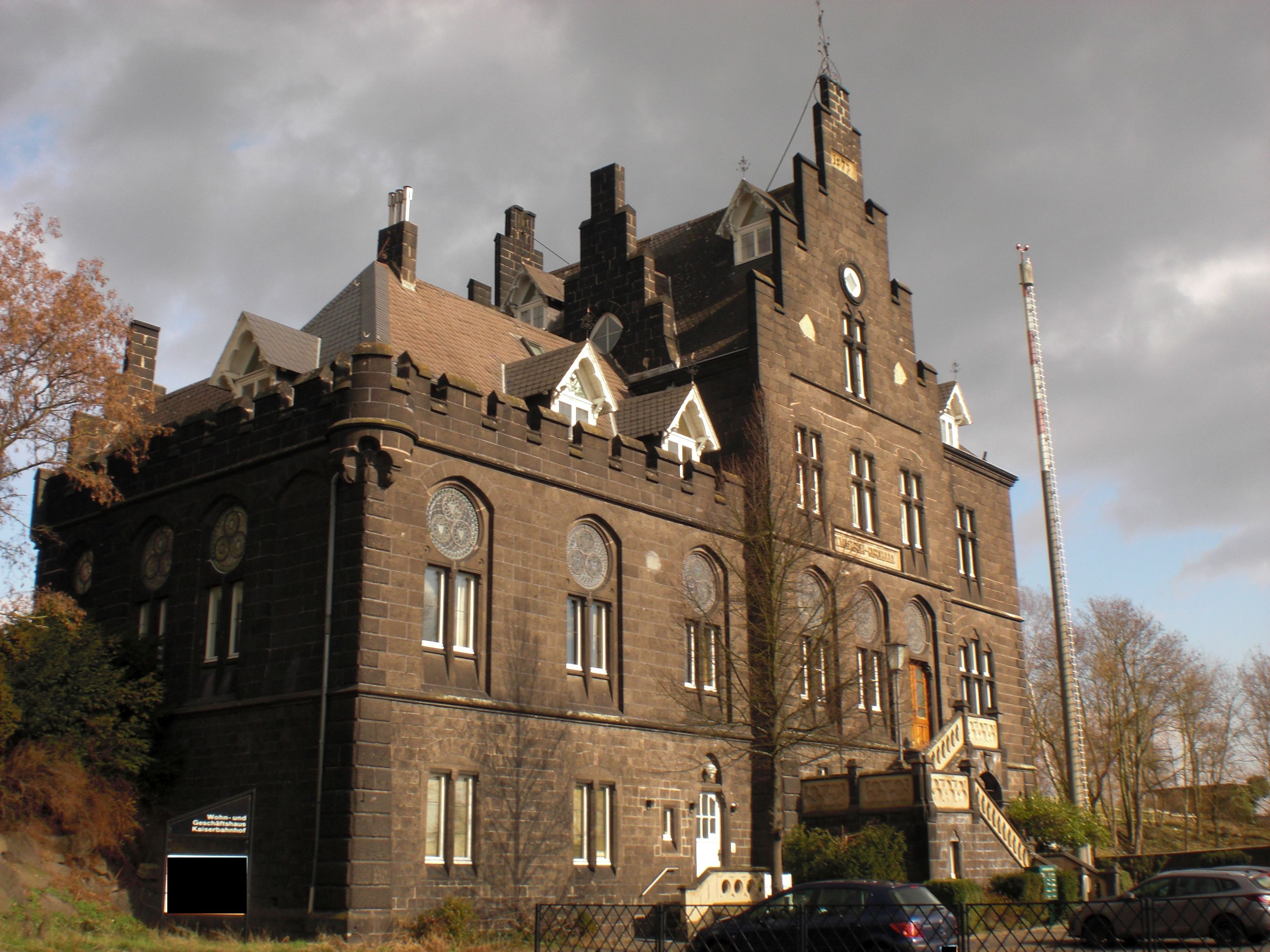

General information
- Location: Bahnstr. 5, Mendig, Rhineland-Palatinate; Germany
- Coordinates: 50°22′10″N 7°17′27″E
- Line: Cross Eifel Railway
- Platforms: 3

Construction
- Accessible: Platform 1 only
- Architect: Gustav Päffgen
- Architectural style: Gothic Revival

Other information
- Station code: 4509
- DS100 code: KNME
- IBNR: 8004393
- Category: 6
- Fare zone: VRM: 390
- Website: www.bahnhof.de

History
- Opened: 1877

Services
Preceding station	DB Regio Mitte	Following station
Thür towards Mayen Ost	RB 23	Kruft towards Limburg (Lahn)
Thür towards Kaisersesch	RB 38	Kruft towards Andernach
Location

Mendig is a station in the town of Mendig in the German state of Rhineland-Palatinate. It was called Niedermendig until 1877. It is located on the Cross Eifel Railway (Eifelquerbahn), which has two tracks from Andernach station and continues as a single track to Gerolstein station. The only set of points at the station is located west of the platform just before the Bahnstraße level crossing and has the points number of 23.

== Services ==
The Cross Eifel Railway is served by Regionalbahn line Lahn-Eifel-Bahn: RB 23 (Mayen Ost – Koblenz Hbf – Limburg) and RB 38 (Kaisersesch – Mayen Ost – Andernach).

== Emperor station ==
The station building was built in 1877 to a design of the Cologne architect Gustav Päffgen. The so-called Kaiserbahnhof (Emperor station) got its name because Emperor Wilhelm II used the station as a starting point for visits to the Eifel. It has been shown that he took a carriage from the station to visit the Maria Laach Abbey. It is considered one of the most beautiful historic buildings in the region around Mendig.

The stately design shows the importance that the railway had as a means of transport. The façade mainly displays Gothic Revival elements and the structure is accessible via a two-flight staircase. The walls are divided by cornices and the building edges are accentuated by corner blocks.

The now restored building has been converted into a residential and office building. It is now privately owned.

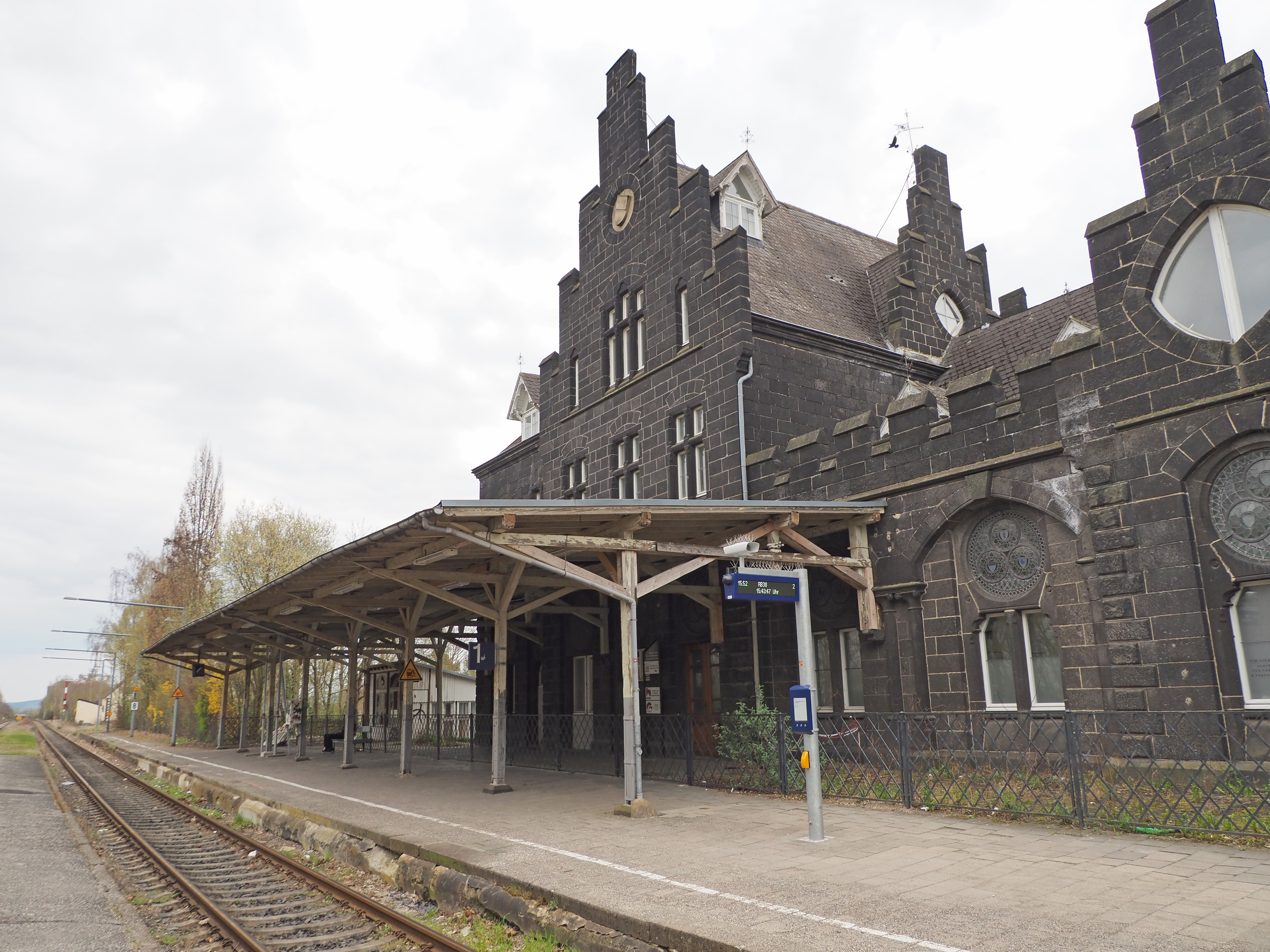
Plattform at the station
