= Kaisersesch =

- Town
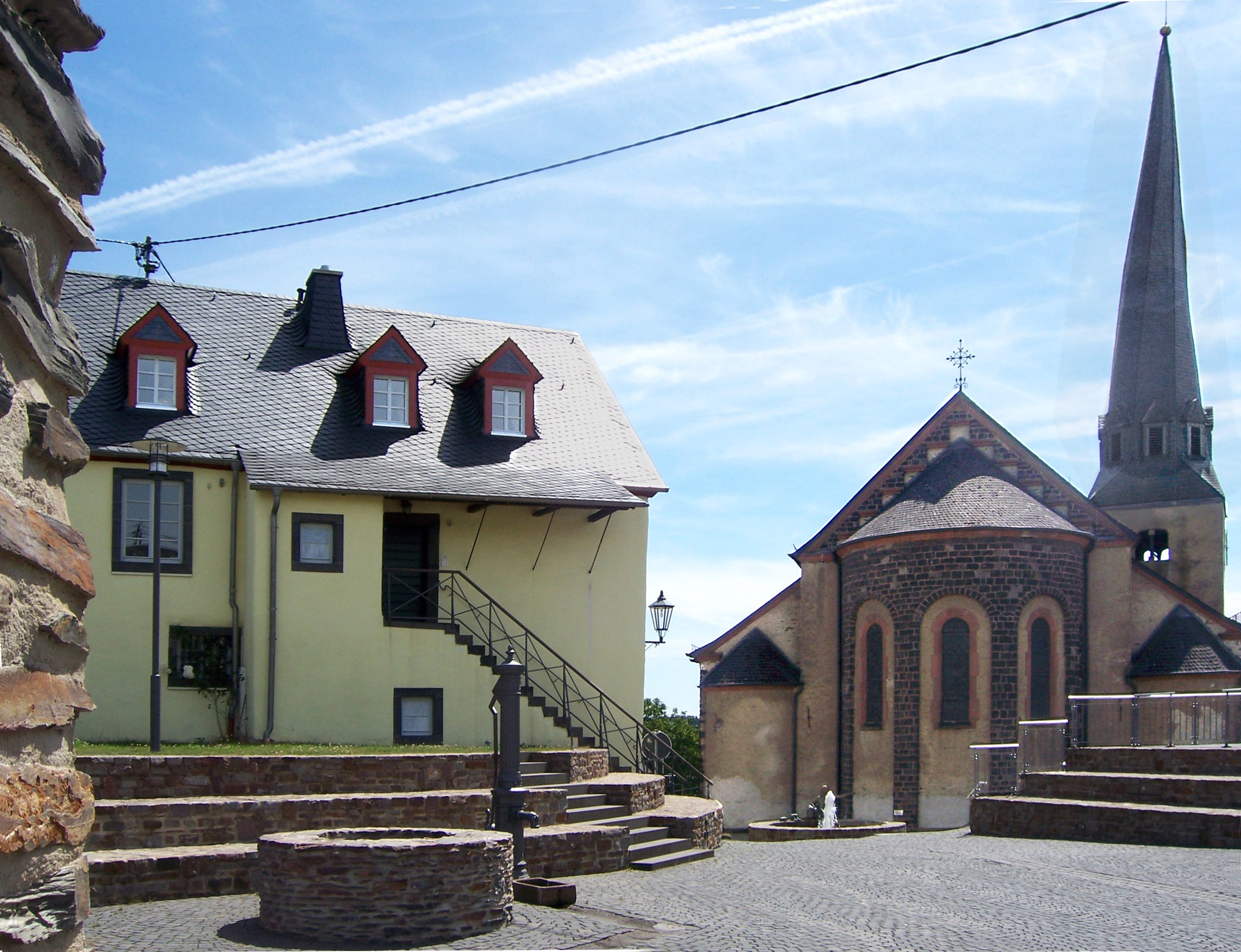
- Historic town centre, Saint Pancras Church with crooked steeple

- Coat of arms

- Location of Kaisersesch within Cochem-Zell district
- Interactive map of Kaisersesch
- Location within Germany Location within Rhineland-Palatinate
- Coordinates: 50°13′56″N 7°8′22″E
- Country: Germany
- State: Rhineland-Palatinate
- District: Cochem-Zell
- Municipal assoc.: Kaisersesch

Government
  - Mayor (2024–25): Gerhard Weber (CDU)

Area
  - Total: 8.18 km^{2} (3.16 sq mi)
- Elevation: 410 m (1,350 ft)

Population (2025-12-31)
  - Total: 3,268
  - Density: 400/km^{2} (1,030/sq mi)
- Time zone: UTC+01:00 (CET)
  - Summer (DST): UTC+02:00 (CEST)
- Postal codes: 56759
- Dialling codes: 02653
- Vehicle registration: COC
- Website: https://www.stadt-kaisersesch.de/

Kaisersesch (German: [ˌkaɪzɐsˈʔɛʃ]) is a town in the Cochem-Zell district in Rhineland-Palatinate, Germany. It is the administrative seat of the like-named Verbandsgemeinde, to which it also belongs.

== Geography ==
The town lies in the eastern Eifel halfway between the rivers Elz and Endert in the headwaters of the Pommerbach, roughly 14 kilometres (8.7 mi) north of Cochem and 16 kilometres (9.9 mi) southwest of Mayen. Its elevation is 410 metres (1,350 ft) above sea level.

== History ==
The place where Kaisersesch now stands was once a crossroads in prehistoric and Roman times. A Roman presence is known to have existed here from a gravesite and a water supply line that have been unearthed.

In the Early Middle Ages, Asche, as it was once known, was among the Lotharingian county palatine's holdings. Sometime between 1051 and 1056, Esch, as it came to be known, had its first documentary mention in a donation document dealing with the Ezzonid heiress Richeza's great donation to the Brauweiler Monastery near Cologne. Beginning in 1294, Esch was a court centre in the Electorate of Trier. In 1320, it was heavily fortified, and the following year, on Archbishop Balduin's instigation, it was granted town rights by King Louis the Bavarian. Thereafter, the town was known as Kaisersesch (“Emperor’s Esch”), although locals sometimes still call it simply Esch even today.

In the Nine Years' War (known in Germany as the Pfälzischer Erbfolgekrieg, or War of the Palatine Succession), the town was all but utterly destroyed in 1689 by the French. Beginning in 1794, Kaisersesch lay under French rule, under which it was stripped of its town rights. In 1815 it was assigned to the Kingdom of Prussia at the Congress of Vienna.

In 1895, the Andernach-Gerolstein railway reached Kaisersesch, and the town began to develop as an important regional centre in the eastern Eifel, which was the first economic boost that the town had since its destruction in the Nine Years' War.

Since 1946, Kaisersesch has been part of the then newly founded state of Rhineland-Palatinate. On 22 November 1997, Kaisersesch was granted town rights once again.

== Politics ==
=== Town council ===
The council is made up of 20 council members who were elected by proportional representation at the municipal election held on 7 June 2009, and the honorary mayor as chairman.

The municipal election held on 7 June 2009 yielded the following results:

Year	SPD	CDU	UBL	FWG	Total
2009	3	11	5	1	20 seats
2004	3	12	4	1	20 seats

=== Mayor ===
Since 2012, Kaisersesch's mayor is Gerhard Weber (CDU).

=== Coat of arms ===
The German blazon reads: In Silber ein durchgehendes rotes Kreuz, im ersten Winkel ein sechs-strahliger schwarzer Stern über liegendem schwarzen Halbmond.

The town's arms might in English heraldic language be described thus: Argent a cross gules, in dexter chief a mullet over a crescent sable.

The cross refers to the Electorate of Trier, and the charges in dexter chief (in the upper right from the armsbearer's point of view, but upper left from the viewer's) are court symbols that crop up often in the Rhenish region.

The arms have been borne since 1954, but are based on an old court seal from the 15th century that shows exactly this composition.

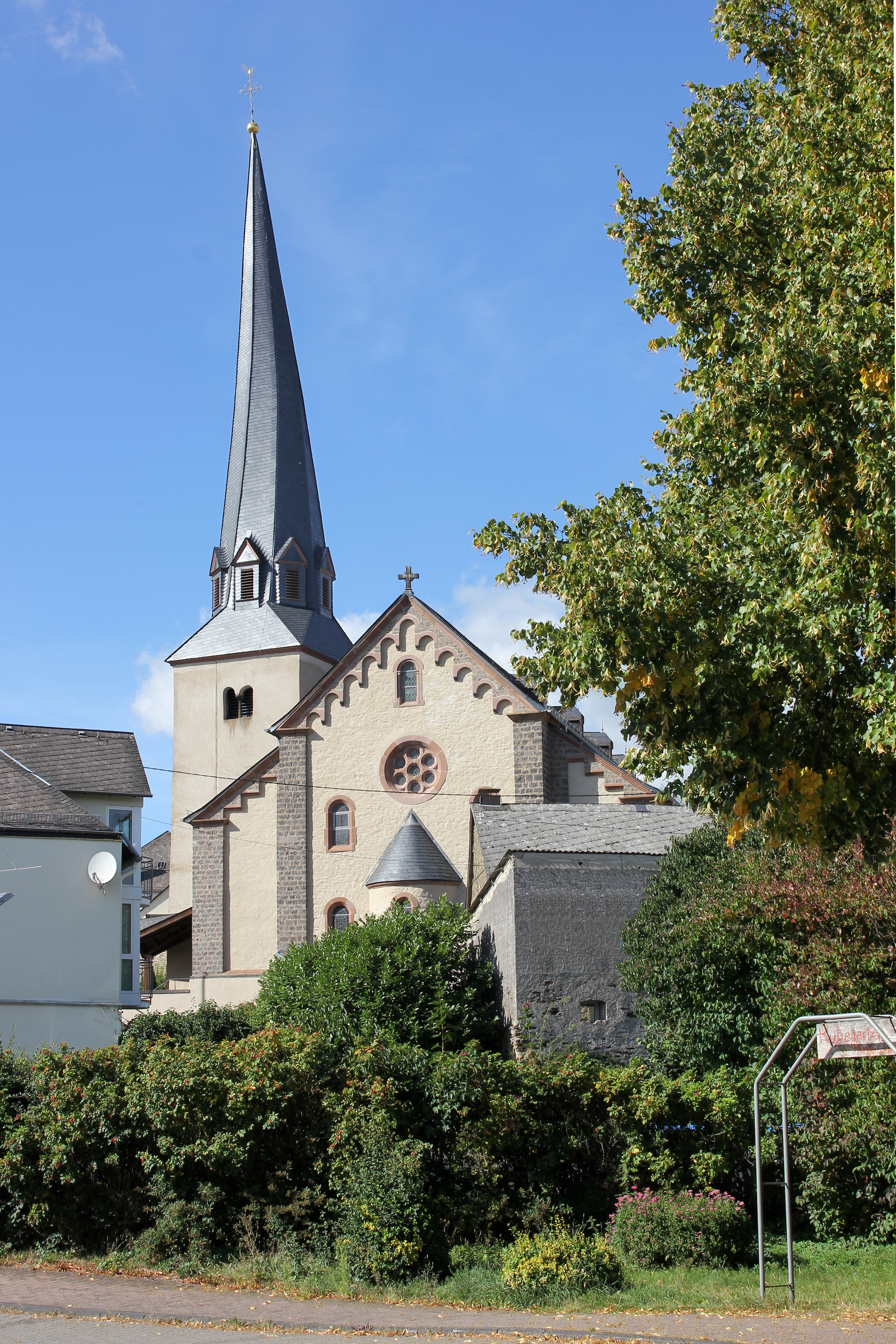
Parish church Saint Pancras, view from southeast

== Culture and sightseeing ==
=== Buildings ===
The following are listed buildings or sites in Rhineland-Palatinate’s Directory of Cultural Monuments:

- Saint Pancras’s Catholic Parish Church (Pfarrkirche St. Pankratius), Balduinstraße – Romanesque Revival pseudo-basilica, 1898-1900, architect Lambert von Fisenne, Gelsenkirchen, side tower from early 14th century
- Forest chapel Zur schmerzhaften Muttergottes (“To Our Lady of Sorrows”); plastered building, one-sided hipped saddle roof, bears yeardates 1796 and 1833
- Bahnhofstraße 33 – villa with hipped roof, 1928; whole complex with garden
- Balduinstraße 7 – Burgmann‌enhaus, so-called “old prison”; essentially mediaeval, parts of the old wall
- Koblenzer Straße (no number) – former school; two-winged building, built since 1836, architect Johann Claudius von Lassaulx, Koblenz; teacher's house, 1901
- Koblenzer Straße 46 – country estate, 18th century; timber-frame house, partly solid, plastered
- Koblenzer Straße 48 – timber-frame house, partly solid or slated, 17th century, essentially possibly from the 16th century; whole complex with barn
- Old graveyard, Pankratiusstraße (monumental zone) – chapel, Gothic Revival brick aisleless church, 19th century; gravestones, 18th and 19th centuries
- Turmgarten (“Tower Garden”) – round tower from the town fortifications, now only preserved as scant remnants
- Von der Leyenstraße/corner of Höfchen – relief stone
- South of the village on Landesstraße (State Road) 98 (monumental zone) – Jewish graveyard; 22 grave steles from 1920 to 1941

=== Other sights ===
Kaisersesch is also home to a well preserved Roman wall.

The steeple at Saint Pancras's Church is also of special note in that it is noticeably crooked.

== Transport ==
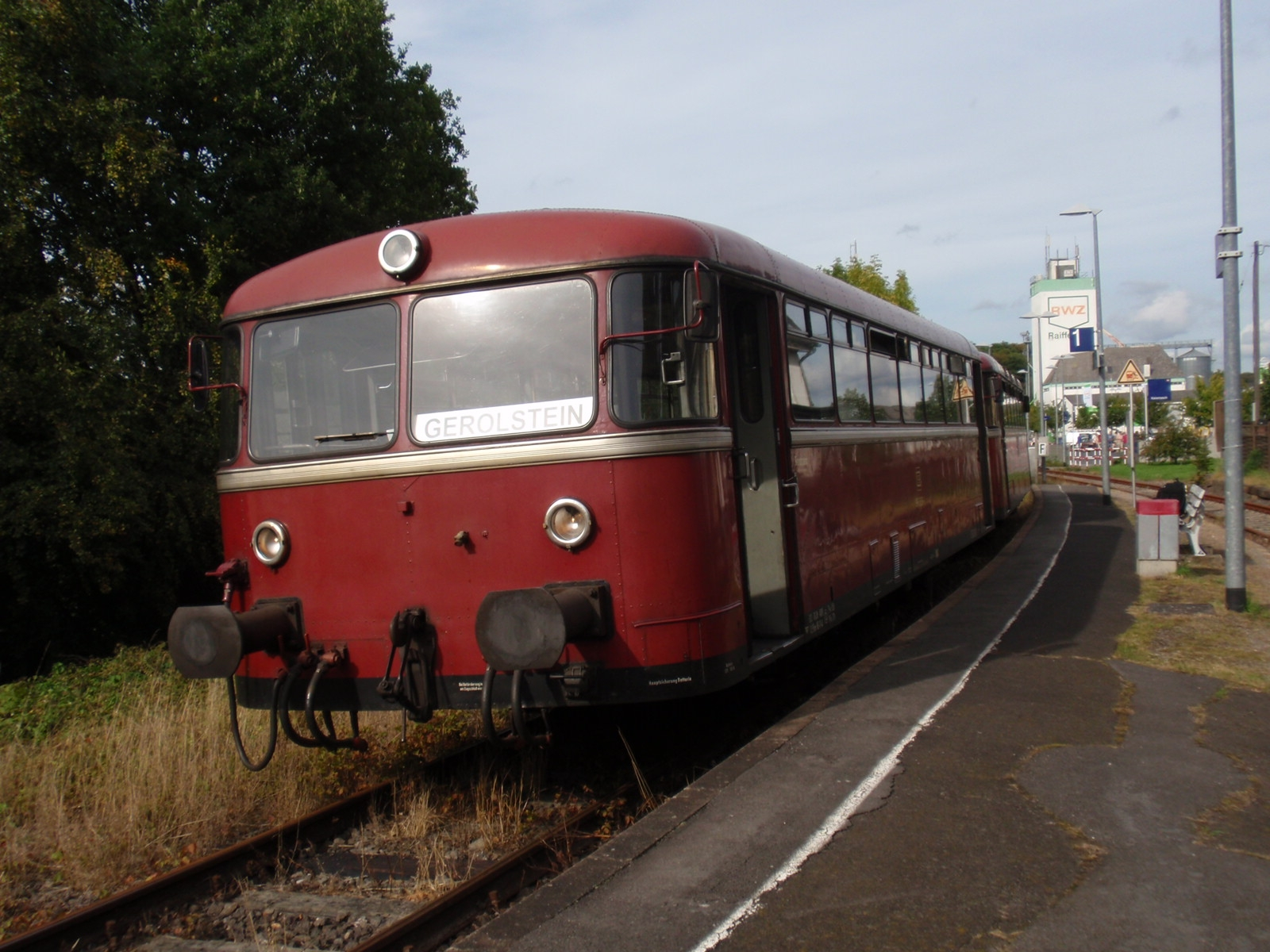
Special train to Gerolstein via Daun in Kaiersesch station

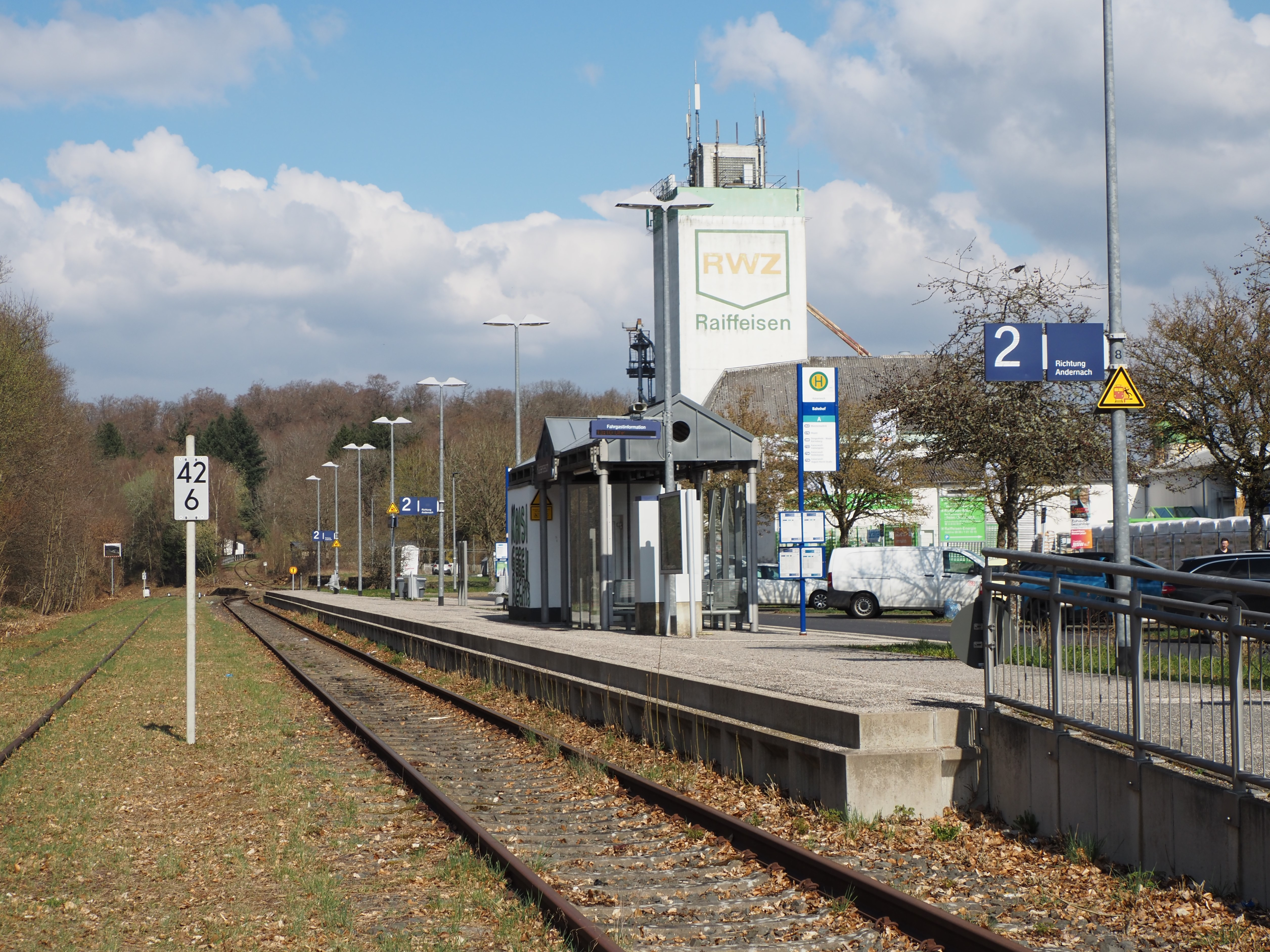
Kaisersech train station, platform for regular trains via Mayen to Andernach

Kaisersesch is located on Cross Eifel Railway and end of line RB38, a line of Lahn-Eifel-Bahn of Deutsche Bahn AG, coming from Andernach via Mayen. Many years Kaisersesch also was the end of the touristik special train service from Gerolstein via Daun and Ulmen to Kaiersesch. There also is a park and ride parking lot for public transport users at Kaisersesch station. Kaisersesch is located in the zone number 726 of Verkehrsverbund Rhein-Mosel (VRM).

== Notable people ==
=== Sons and daughters of the town ===
- Werner Höfer
- Peter Kremer (writer)
- Oswald Mathias Ungers, architect
