= Altendorf, Essen =

Altendorf
- Borough of Essen
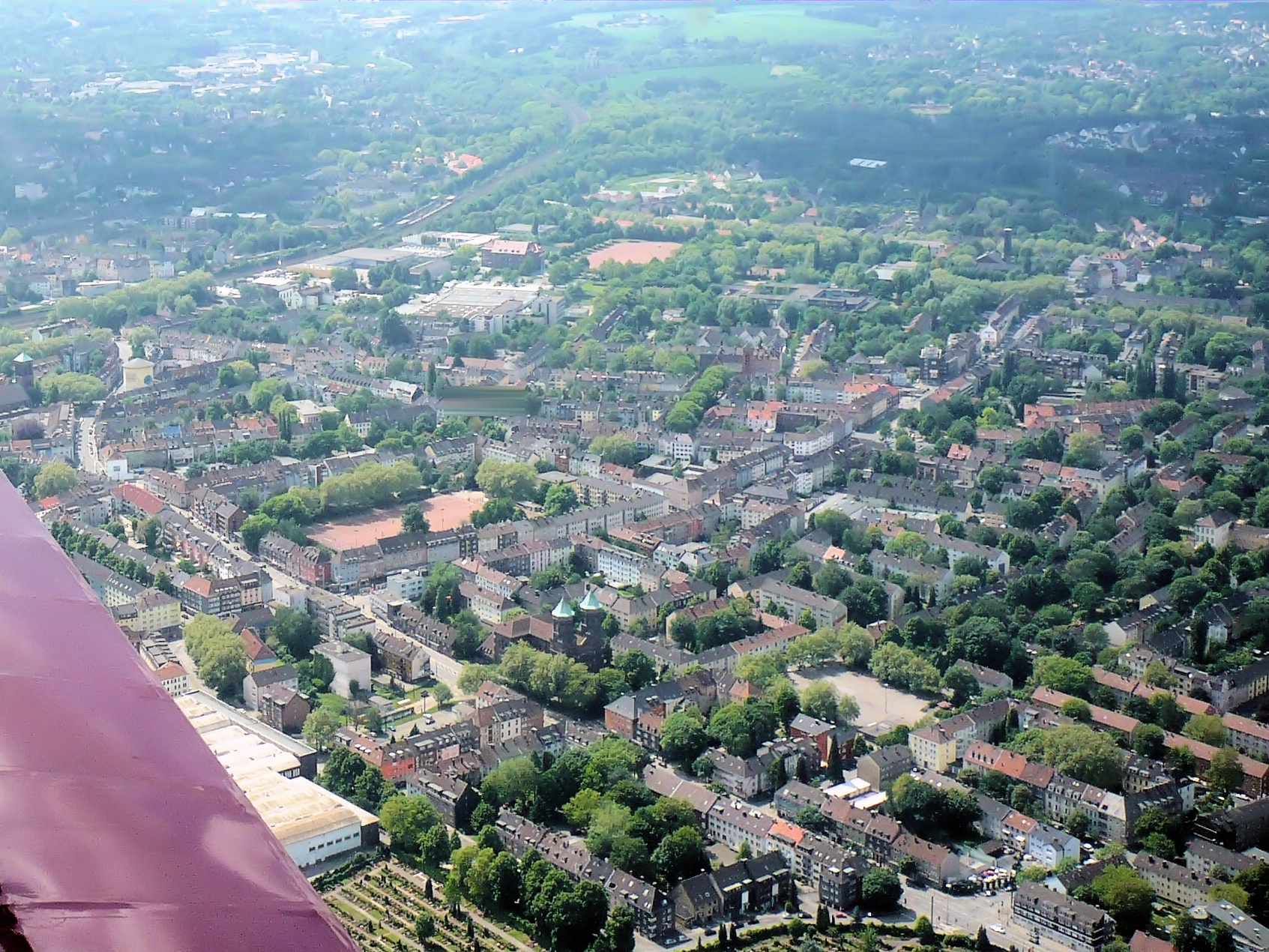
- Aerial view of Altendorf, Essen, in 2009

- Coat of arms

- Altendorf shown within Essen
- Coordinates: 51°27′39″N 6°58′37″E
- District of Essen: Stadtbezirk III
- State electoral district: Wahlkreis 67
- Federal electoral district: Wahlkreis 120
- Hof Ehrenzell donated to Essen Abbey: 966
- Part of Borbeck, Prussia: 1816
- Town within Essen district: 1 January 1874
- Incorporation into City of Essen: 1 August 1901
- Admin HQ: Essen City Hall, Porscheplatz 1

Government
  - Type: City council
  - Body: Stadtrat Essen
  - Lord Mayor: Thomas Kufen (Note: (Since 27 September 2015)) (CDU)
  - Bezirksbürgermeister (City district mayor): Doris Eisenmenger, (Greens) (Note: (Since 13 September 2020))
  - Landtag MP: Britta Altenkamp, (SPD) (Note: (Since 14 May 2017))
  - Bundestag MP: Matthias Hauer, (CDU) (Note: (Since 24 September 2017))

Area
  - Total: 2.49 km^{2} (0.96 sq mi)

Population (2020)
  - Total: 22,691
  - Density: 8,850/km^{2} (22,900/sq mi)
- Time zone: UTC+1 (CET)
  - Summer (DST): UTC+2 (CEST)
- Postal code: 45143
- Area code: 0201
- Website: essen.de

Altendorf (German pronunciation: [ˈaltn̩ˌdɔʁf], lit. 'old village') is a northwestern borough of the city of Essen, Germany. It was incorporated into the city on 1 August 1901. Previously, it had been part of the Bürgermeisterei Altendorf (Altendorf district), which existed since 1874. Altendorf consisted of two parts, Oberdorf (upper village) and Unterdorf (lower village). Around 23.000 people live here.

== Geography ==
Altendorf borders the boroughs of Nordviertel and Westviertel to the east, Frohnhausen to the south, Schönebeck to the west and Bochold to the north.
