= Duisburg-Meiderich Ost station =

Railway station in Duisburg, Germany

Duisburg Meiderich Ost
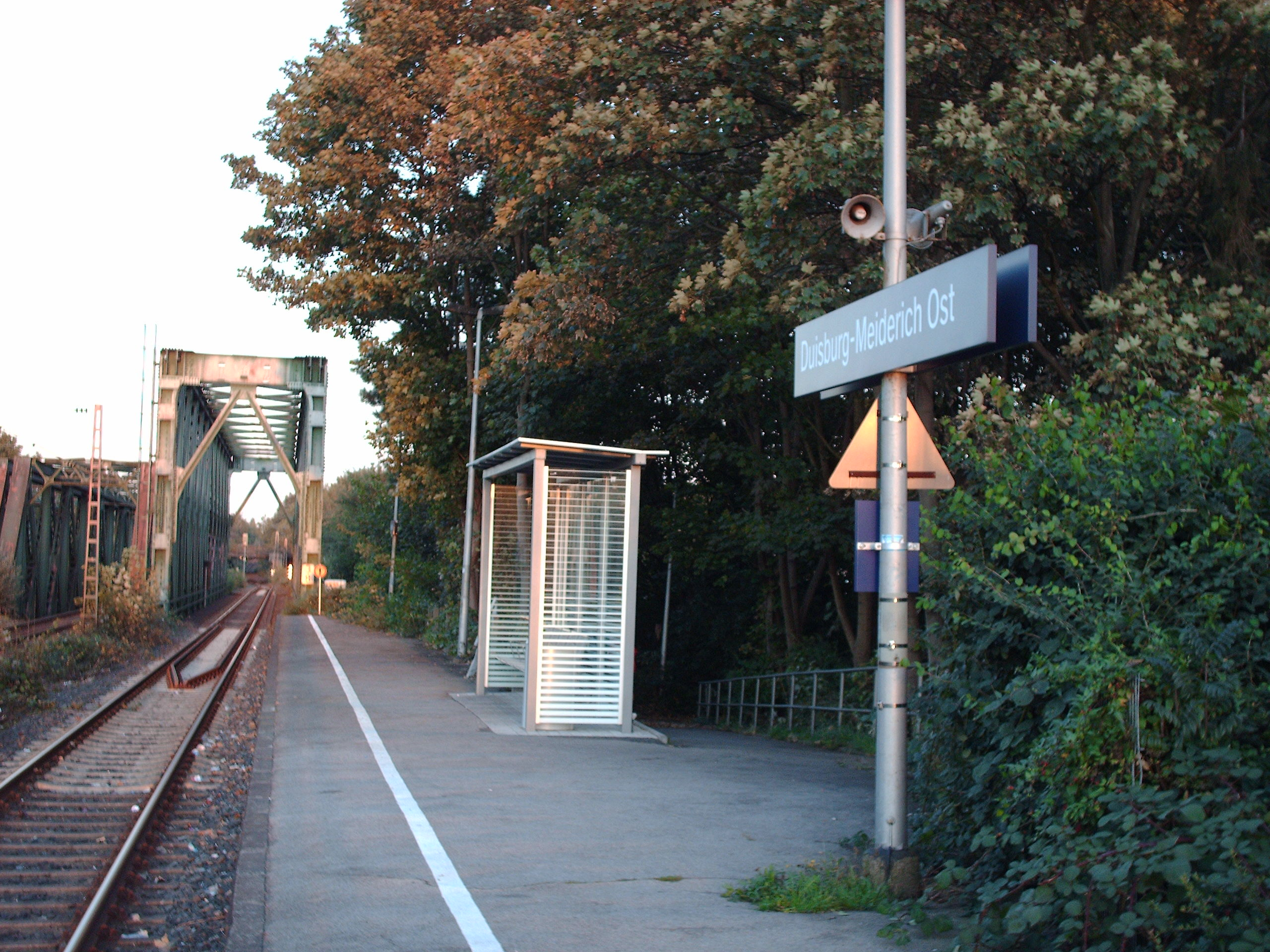

General information
- Location: Duisburg, NRW, Germany
- Coordinates: 51°28′07″N 6°48′03″E
- Owner: DB Netz
- Operator: DB Station&Service
- Line: Oberhausen–Duisburg-Ruhrort railway
- Platforms: 1 side platform
- Tracks: 3
- Train operators: NordWestBahn

Construction
- Accessible: Yes

Other information
- Fare zone: VRR: 230
- Website: www.bahnhof.de

Services
Preceding station	NordWestBahn	Following station
Duisburg-Meiderich Süd towards Duisburg-Ruhrort	RB 36	Duisburg-Obermeiderich towards Oberhausen Hbf
Location
- Location within North Rhine-Westphalia

Duisburg-Meiderich Ost is a railway station in Duisburg, North Rhine-Westphalia, Germany.

== The Station ==
The station is located on the Oberhausen–Duisburg-Ruhrort railway and is served by RB services operated by NordWestBahn.

== Train services ==
The following services currently call at Duisburg-Meiderich Ost:

Series	Operator	Route	Material	Frequency
RB 36 Ruhrort-Bahn	NordWestBahn	Duisburg-Ruhrort - Duisburg-Meiderich Süd - Duisburg-Meiderich Ost - Duisburg-Obermeiderich - Oberhausen Hbf	NWB LINT 41	2x per hour
