= Stadtwerke Oberhausen =

STOAG logo

The Stadtwerke Oberhausen AG (STOAG) is the local transport operator for the city of Oberhausen, Germany. It is a member of the Verkehrsverbund Rhein-Ruhr (VRR) regional transport organization. STOAG operates 6 express bus lines, as well as 10 city bus lines which are operated jointly with Urban-Reisen, and 6 regional lines which are partially operated by STOAG. The city also has 7 regional lines which are not operated by STOAG.

STOAG has more than 120 buses and 6 trams for use on line 112 of the Mülheim tramway network which links Oberhausen to the neighbouring city of Mülheim.

In 2015 STOAG introduced the first two battery electric buses in the Ruhr area, operating on lines 962 and 966. In 2019 line 979, jointly operated by STOAG and Vestische, also switched to electric buses.

== Network ==
The STOAG network has changed a lot in recent years. This is the network, state as of 4 October 2015. Lines that travel through Oberhausen but are not operated by the STOAG are also included. Stops written in italics are not in Oberhausen.

The STOAG also operates a night network with lines NE1–NE7, NE10–NE12 and NE21.

Line	Type of line	Route	Headway in rush-hour (minutes)
112	tram	Mülheim Main Cemetery – Mülheim city centre – Landwehr – Oberhausen railway station – CentrO – Sterkrade Neumarkt	15
SB90	express bus	Ruhrpark – Alstaden – Oberhausen city centre – CentrO – Sterkrade – Schmachtendorf – Holten Market	20
SB91	express bus	Bero-Centre – Oberhausen city centre – CentrO – Osterfeld – Bottrop – Gladbeck – Buer Town Hall	10 as far as Bottrop; 20 to Buer
SB92	express bus	Alstaden – Oberhausen city centre – CentrO – Osterfeld – Königshardt	20
SB93	express bus	Alstaden – Duisburg-Obermeiderich station – Oberhausen city centre – CentrO – Osterfeld – Tackenberg	20
SB94	express bus	Essen Unterstraße – Bermensfeld – Oberhausen city centre – Buschhausen – Sterkrade	20
SB97	express bus	Anne Frank Middle School – Oberhausen city centre – Buschhausen – Sterkrade	20
SB98	express bus	Alstaden – Oberhausen city centre – CentrO – Sterkrade – Schmachtendorf – Königshardt	20
122		Mülheim city centre – Speldorf – Styrum – Oberhausen city centre	20
143		Borbeck – Frintrop – Oberhausen city centre – Alstaden	20
185		Borbeck – Dellwig – Frintrop – CentrO	20
935		Sterkrade – Hamborn – Neumühl – Oberhausen city centre – Anne Frank Middle School	60
939		Anne Frank Middle School – Oberhausen city centre – Duisburg-Obermeiderich station – Duisburg city centre – Duisburg Hospital	60
953		Wehrstraße – Dümpten – Knappen Market – CentrO – Tackenberg – Bottrop Spechtstraße	60
954		Marina/SeaLife – Osterfeld – Sterkrade – Holten – Schmachtendorf – Brink Hirschkamp	30
955		Anne Frank Middle School – Oberhausen city centre – Buschhausen – Sterkrade – Alsfeld – Heinrich Böll Integrated School	60
956		Wehrstraße – Oberhausen city centre – Oberhausen Castle – Osterfeld – Sterkrade – Biefang	30
957		Lirich – Oberhausen city centre – Borbeck – Osterfeld – Sterkrade – Weierheide ( – Barmingholten)	20
960		Dümpten – Wehrstraße – Oberhausen city centre – CentrO – Sterkrade – Königshardt – Holten	20
961		Wehrstraße – Oberhausen city centre – CentrO – Osterfeld – Bottrop-Spechtstraße	60
962	electric bus	Sterkrade – Alsfeld – Königshardt – Kleekamp	60
966	electric bus	Oberhausen city centre – St. Mary's Church – Oberhausen Castle – Sterkrade	60
976		Dümpten – Wehrstraße – Oberhausen city centre – Buschhausen – Sterkrade – Königshardt	20
979		Sterkrade – Klosterhardt – Bottrop-Fuhlenbrock – Bottrop	20
995		Anne Frank Middle School – City – Lirich – Neumühl – Marxloh	60
