= Bochold =

Coordinates: 51.475°N 6.9675°E

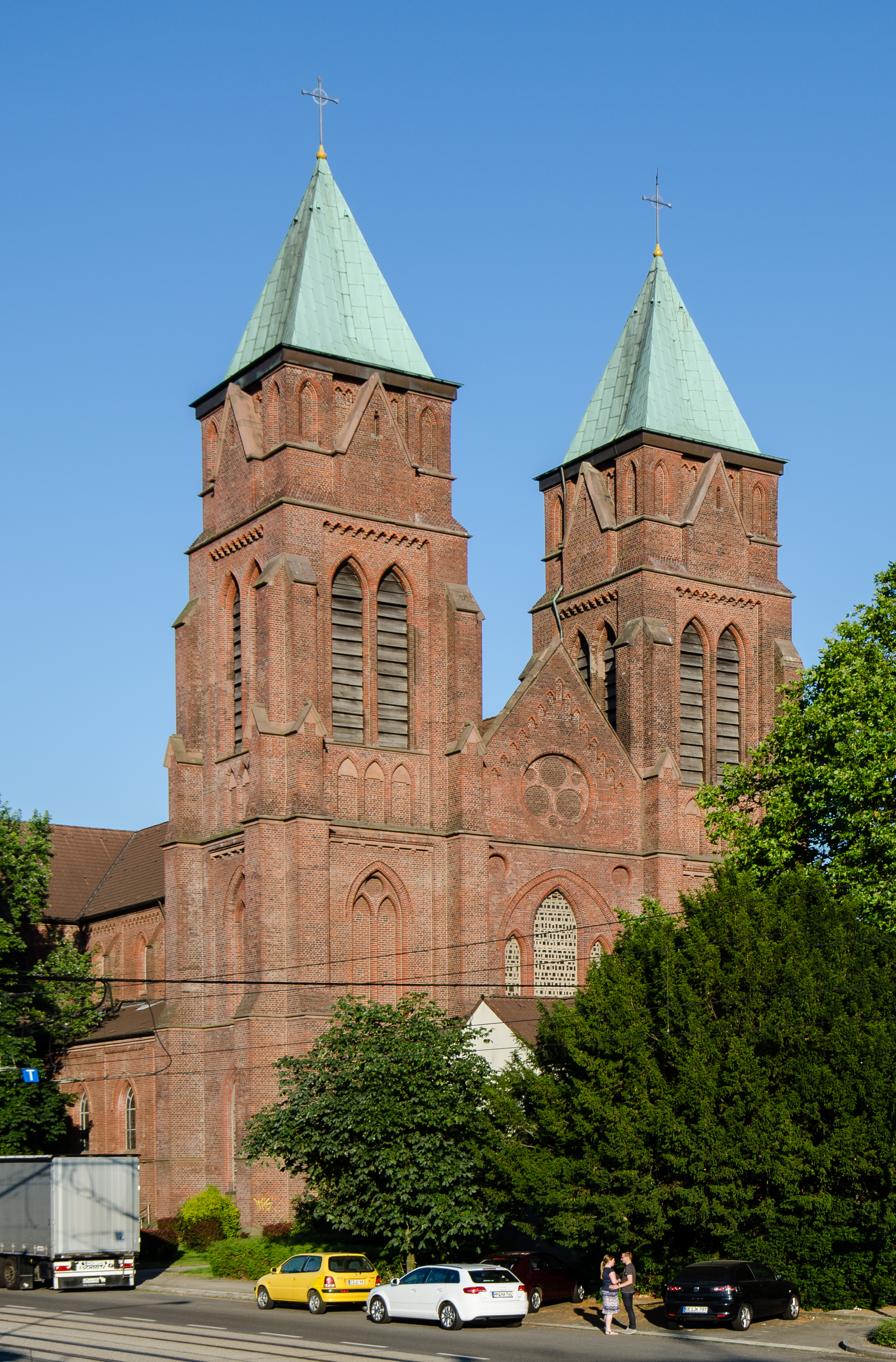
Church of St Mary Rosary (German: St. Maria Rosenkranz) in Bochold in 2013

Bochold (German pronunciation: [ˈbɔxɔlt]) is a northwestern borough of the city of Essen, Germany. It was incorporated into the city in 1915. Before it had been part of the Bürgermeisterei Borbeck (Borbeck district). Around 18,200 people live here.

S-Bahn trains have a stop at Bergeborbeck station, which is located in the Bochold borough. It should not be mixed up with the city of Bocholt, 60 km (37 mi) to the northwest.

== Geography ==
Bochold borders the boroughs of Altenessen to the east, Nordviertel, Altendorf and Schönebeck to the south, Borbeck-Mitte in the west, and Bergeborbeck and Vogelheim in the north.
