= Bedingrade =

Borough of Essen, Germany

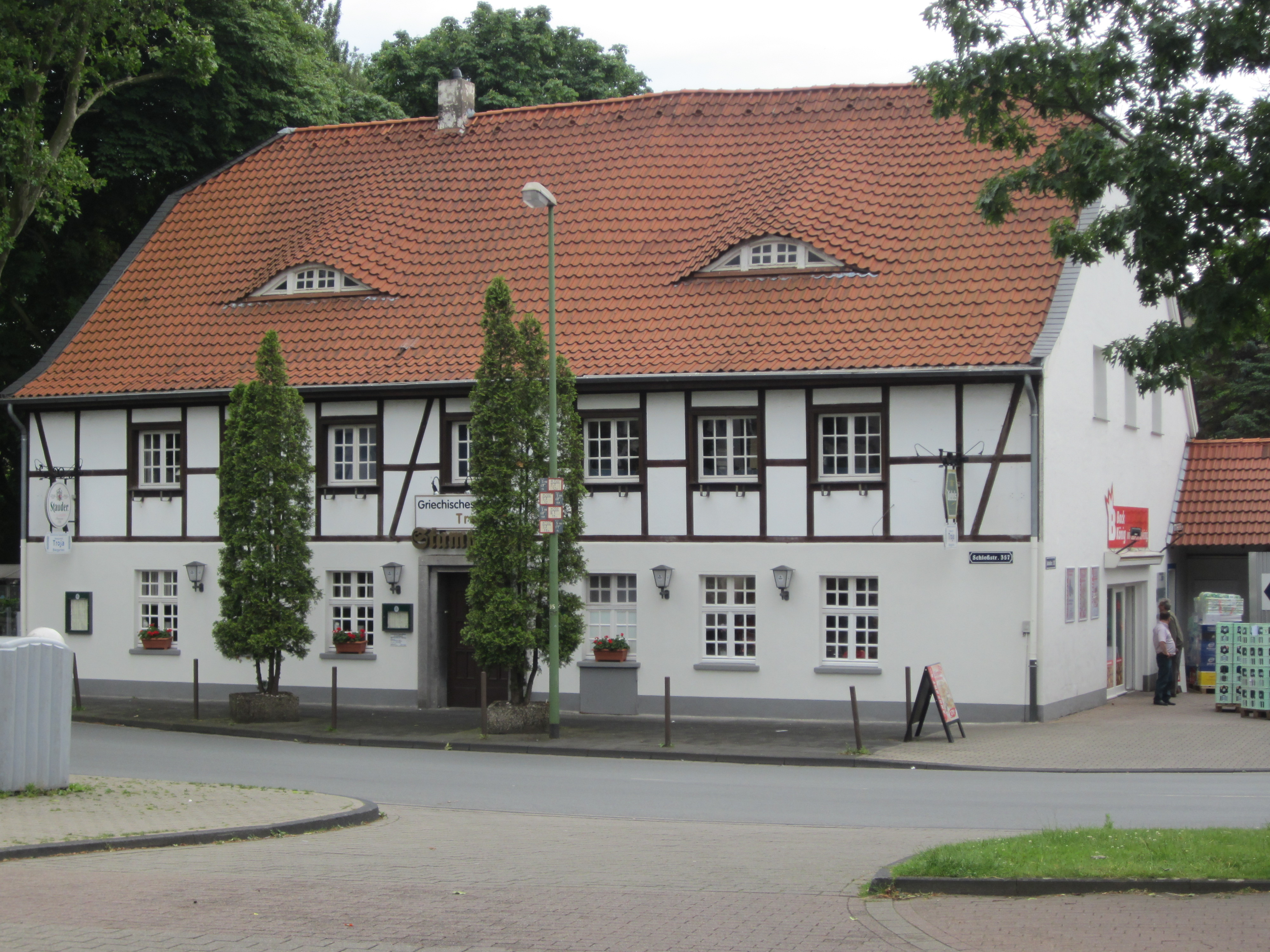
Half-timbered Stammhaus in Bedingrade, first mentioned in 1604

Bedingrade is a northwestern borough of the city of Essen, Germany. It was incorporated into the city in 1915. Before it had been part of the Bürgermeisterei Borbeck (Borbeck district). Bedingrade was first mentioned in the 11th century as Batingrotha. While Bathing was probably the name of a family, -rade/-rotha means Rodung (cleared woodland). Around 12.000 people live here.

== Geography ==
Bedingrade borders the boroughs of Gerschede and Borbeck-Mitte to the east, Schönebeck to the south, and Frintrop and Dellwig in the north.
