= Bergeborbeck =

Borough of Essen, Germany

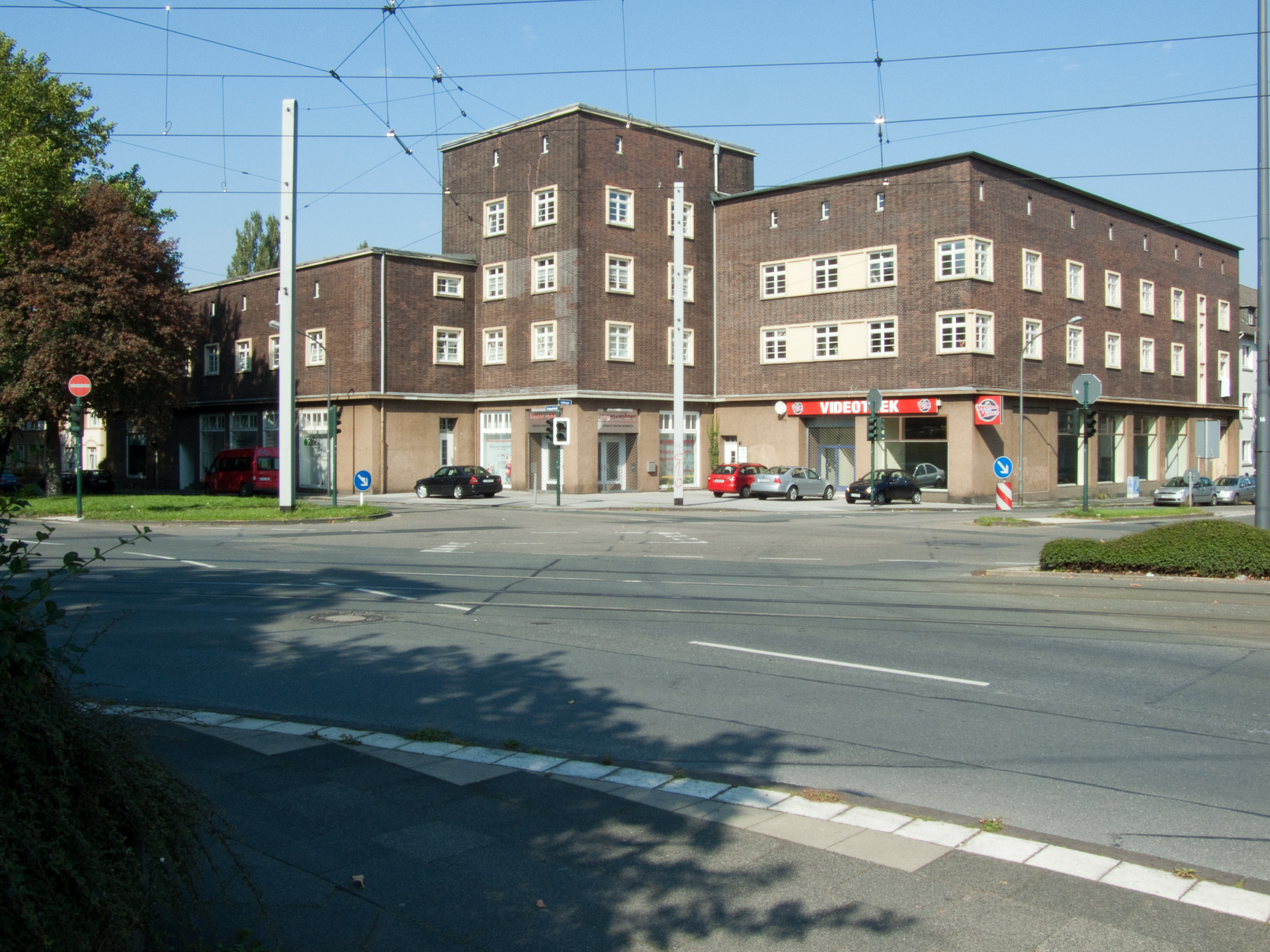
Cultural heritage building of former Krupp’sche Konsumanstalt in Bergeborbeck, Essen

Bergeborbeck is a northern borough of the city of Essen, Germany, with a population of around 4,400. It was incorporated into the city in 1915, having previously been part of the Bürgermeisterei Borbeck (Borbeck district).

S-Bahn trains have a stop at Bergeborbeck station, which is named after the borough, but located within the boundaries of nearby Bochold.

The football stadium of Georg-Melches-Stadion was located in Bergeborbeck before it was demolished and replaced by nearby Stadion Essen in 2012.

== Geography ==
Bergeborbeck borders the boroughs of Vogelheim to the east, Bochold to the south, and Borbeck-Mitte, Gerschede and Dellwig in the west.
