= Duisburg-Meiderich Süd station =

Railway station in Duisburg, Germany

Duisburg Meiderich Süd
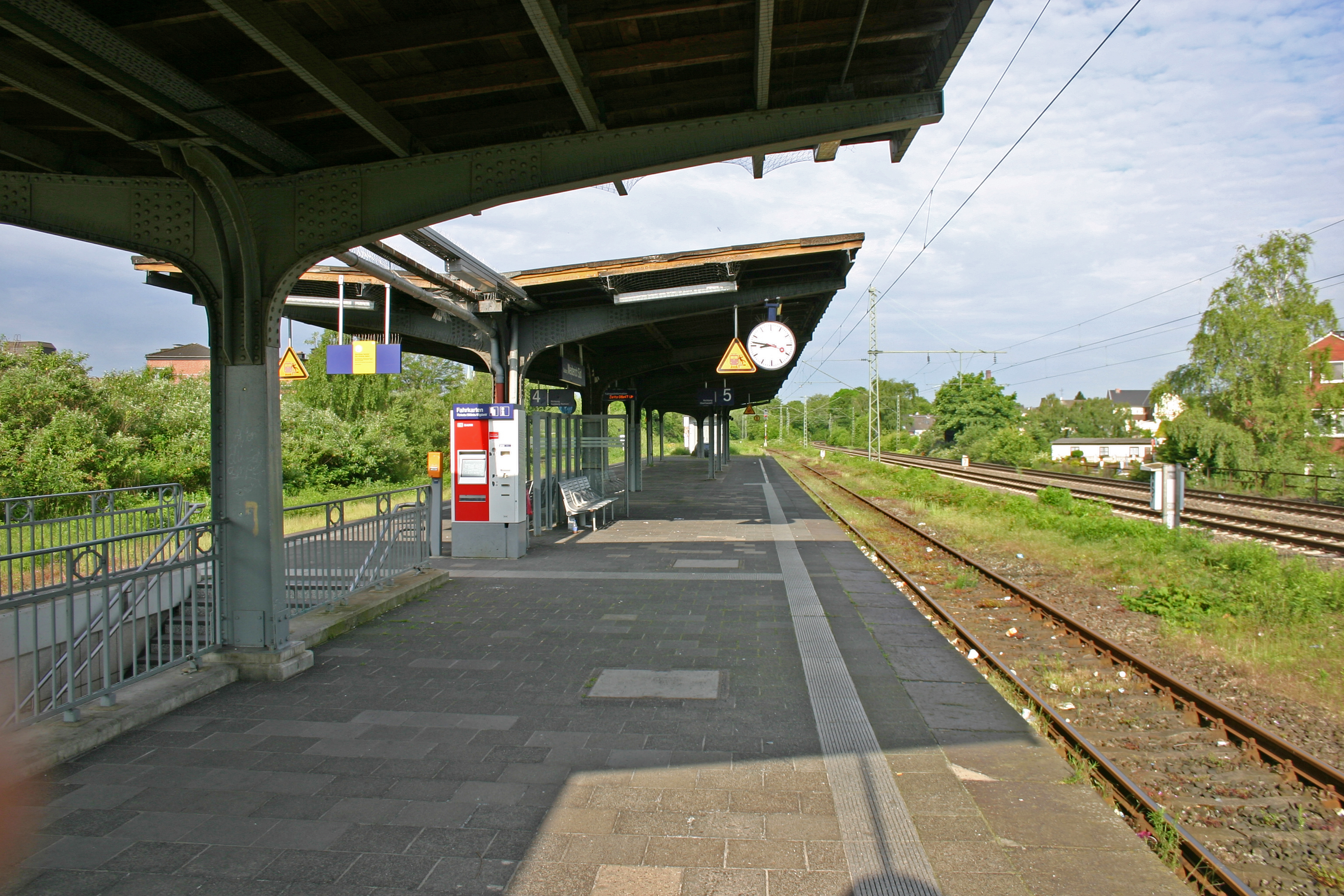

General information
- Location: Duisburg, NRW, Germany
- Coordinates: 51°28′07″N 6°46′51″E
- Owner: DB Netz
- Operator: DB Station&Service
- Line: Oberhausen–Duisburg-Ruhrort railway
- Platforms: 1 island platform
- Tracks: 4
- Train operators: NordWestBahn

Construction
- Accessible: Yes

Other information
- Fare zone: VRR: 230
- Website: www.bahnhof.de

History
- Opened: 1856; 170 years ago

Services
Preceding station	NordWestBahn	Following station
Duisburg-Ruhrort Terminus	RB 36	Duisburg-Meiderich Ost towards Oberhausen Hbf
Preceding station	Rhine-Ruhr Stadtbahn	Following station
Auf dem Damm towards Universität Ost/Botanischer Garten	U79	Terminus
Preceding station	Straßenbahn Duisburg	Following station
Auf dem Damm towards Mannesmann Tor II	903	Emilstraße towards Dinslaken
Location
- Location within North Rhine-Westphalia

Duisburg-Meiderich Süd is a railway station in Duisburg, North Rhine-Westphalia, Germany serving the city district of Meiderich. The station is located on the Oberhausen–Duisburg-Ruhrort railway and is served by RB services operated by NordWestBahn There also is an adjacent underground Stadtbahn station which is named Meiderich Bahnhof (Meiderich station), although besides Meiderich Süd (southern station), there is another station in Meiderich, Meiderich Ost (eastern station).

== Train services ==
The following services currently call at Duisburg-Meiderich Süd:

Series	Operator	Route	Material	Frequency
RB 36 Ruhrort-Bahn	NordWestBahn	Duisburg-Ruhrort - Duisburg-Meiderich Süd - Duisburg-Meiderich Ost - Duisburg-Obermeiderich - Oberhausen Hbf	NWB LINT 41	2x per hour
