= Oberhausen-Sterkrade station =

Railway station in Oberhausen, Germany

Oberhausen Sterkrade
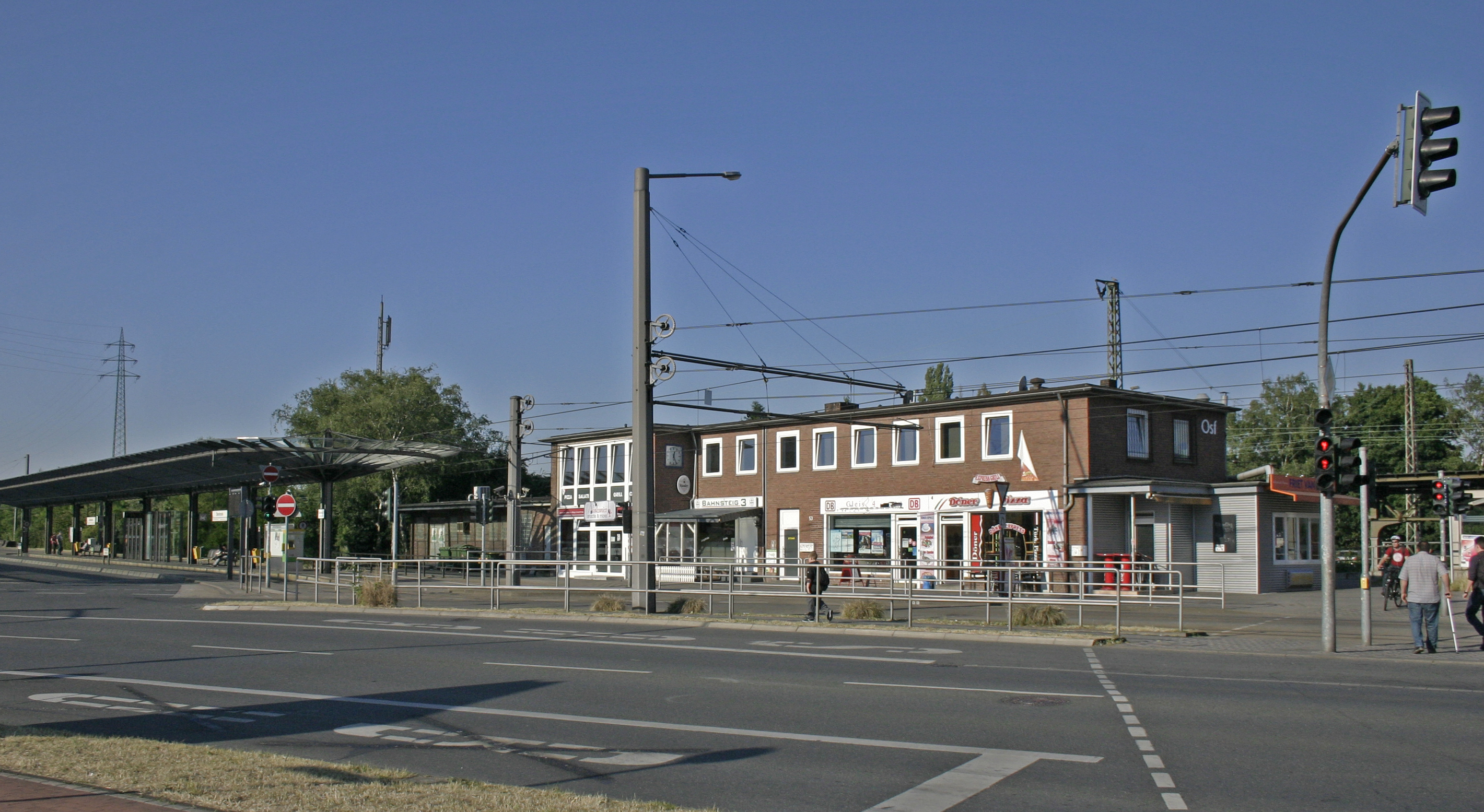
- Oberhausen-Sterkrade station with tram and bus stop, 2015

General information
- Location: Oberhausen, NRW, Germany
- Coordinates: 51°30′42″N 6°50′37″E
- Owner: DB Netz
- Operator: DB Station&Service
- Line: Arnhem-Oberhausen railway
- Platforms: 3
- Tracks: 3

Construction
- Accessible: Platform 1 only

Other information
- Station code: 4651
- DS100 code: EOSD
- IBNR: 8004542
- Category: 5
- Fare zone: VRR: 242
- Website: www.bahnhof.de

History
- Opened: 1 July 1856

Services
| Preceding station | National Express Germany | Following station |
|---|---|---|
| Oberhausen-Holten towards Wesel | RE 5 (Rhein-Express) | Oberhausen Hbf towards Koblenz Hbf |
| Preceding station | VIAS | Following station |
| Oberhausen-Holten towards Arnhem Centraal or Bocholt | RE 19 | Oberhausen Hbf towards Düsseldorf Hbf |
| Preceding station | DB Regio NRW | Following station |
| Oberhausen-Holten towards Wesel | RE 49 | Oberhausen Hbf towards Wuppertal Hbf |
Location
- Location within North Rhine-Westphalia

Oberhausen-Sterkrade is a railway station in Oberhausen, North Rhine-Westphalia, Germany. The station opened on 1 July 1856, is located on the Arnhem-Oberhausen railway. The train services are operated by Deutsche Bahn and Abellio Deutschland.

In 1888 the station building from Köln-Kalk was transferred to Sterkrade. This building was badly damaged during the Second World War, so that a new building had to be erected. This was opened in 1952. It is currently owned by a private investor.

== Location and layout ==
Oberhausen-Sterkrade station is on the Duisburg-Ruhrort–Dortmund railway (line 2206, Wanne-Eickel Hauptbahnhof – Oberhausen-Sterkrade) and the Oberhausen–Arnhem railway (line 2270, Oberhausen Hauptbahnhof – Emmerich border – Arnhem). The neighbouring stations to the south are Oberhausen Hauptbahnhof (line 2270) and Oberhausen-Osterfeld (line 2206), while Oberhausen-Holten station is the next station to the north.

The station has six mainline tracks that run approximately in a south-north direction. Platform track 1 (to Emmerich) and 2 (from Emmerich) are the continuous mainline platform tracks. Track 3 serves as a passing track. Track 4 is used for traffic to the Oxea factory. Tracks 8 and 9 on the east side are used for parking trains, while a former siding to the GHH wheelset factory is no longer used. The entrance building is located east of platform 1. The station is equipped with a platform next to the station building on track 1 (172 metres long) and an island platform between tracks 2 and 3 (222 metres long). The platforms are 38 centimetres high with the exception of a short, raised area on platform 1. Within the station precinct, Rosastraße crosses the tracks to the south over a level crossing.

The station has two exits: the western one leads to the park-and-ride car park on Neumühler Straße in the Schwarze Heide district and the eastern one leads directly to the centre of Sterkrad. The exits can be reached via short ramps next to the stairs, but the island platform can only be reached by stairs so the station is not barrier-free.

== History ==
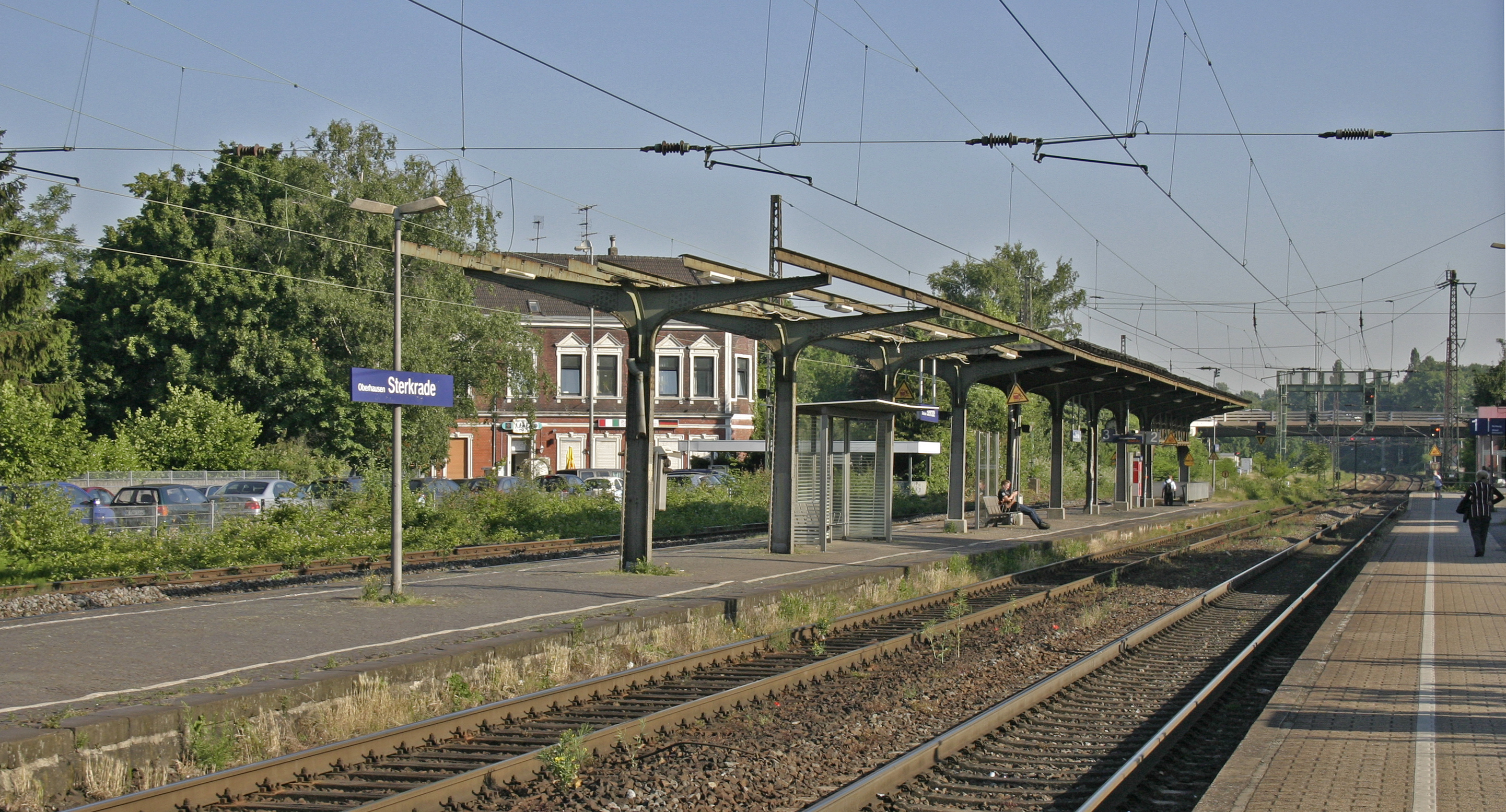
Platforms in Oberhausen-Sterkrade, 2015

The station was opened with the Oberhausen–Dinslaken section of the Oberhausen–Arnhem line on 1 July 1856. It was built and operated by the Cologne-Minden Railway Company (Cöln-Mindener Eisenbahn-Gesellschaft, CME), which was nationalised in 1880. The CME put the line between Schalke and Sterkrade into operation as part of the line that developed into the Duisburg-Ruhrort–Dortmund railway (Emschertalbahn) on 15 November 1873. It was initially used only by freight trains, but passenger trains also ran on it from 1 July 1874. The section to Ruhrort was completed a year later, on 1 July 1875. Passenger traffic to Ruhrort started on 15 October 1875. Through trains from Osterfeld to Neumühl still had to reverse in Sterkrade until 1878.

In 1888, the station building was moved from the former Köln-Kalk station to Sterkrade. The building was 82 percent destroyed in the Second World War. From November 1945 to May 1948, passenger and freight trains ran from Sterkrade via the Gutehoffnungshütte mechanical engineering works to Walsum and then via the Walsum Railway (Walsumbahn) to Spellen. This section of the line was no longer connected to the rest of the rail network due to the demolition of two bridges by German troops at the end of the war. The design of the new entrance building was completed in December 1950. The two storey-high ticket hall would be in the left part of the building, the middle part would comprise the station restaurant and service rooms, while baggage handling would be housed in a flat extension. The building was approved on 4 January 1951 and completed the following year.

The "Osf" relay interlocking was opened on the ground floor of an annex in 1973. It replaced three older mechanical signal boxes. The station was connected to the computer-based interlocking at Emmerich in June 2013.

== Proposed development ==
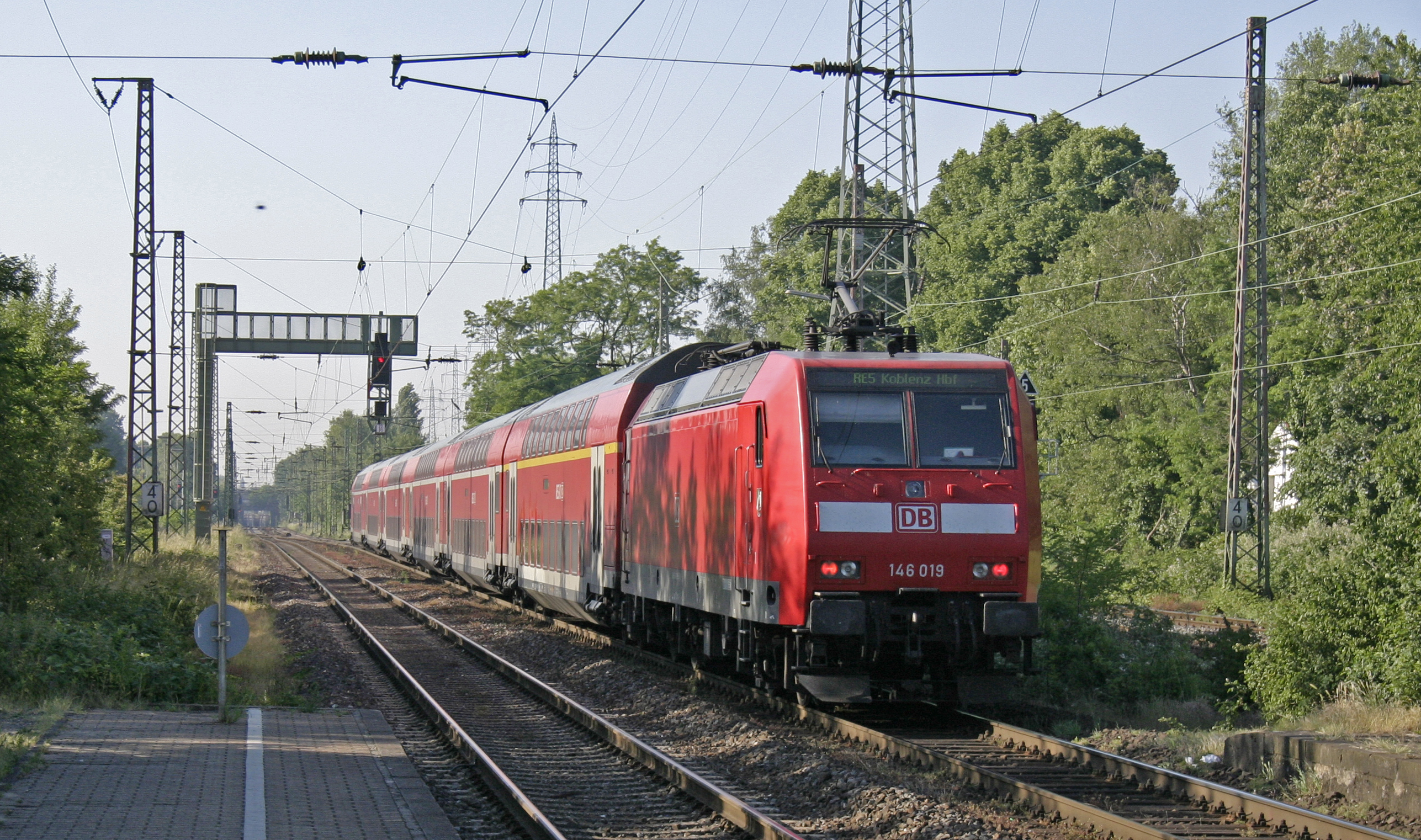
Departure of the RE5 from Oberhausen-Sterkrade to Koblenz in 2015

As part of the upgrade of the line to the Netherlands, the station is to be extensively renovated. Two new tracks will be built along the existing line to the south of the station and the connecting curve to Oberhausen-Osterfeld is to be upgraded to include two tracks for freight traffic. The freight tracks are to run to the north of the station. The Rosastraße level crossing is to be replaced by an overpass. Two island platforms with a height of 76 centimetres high will replace the existing platforms. Barrier-free access will be provided by ramps at the exits and lifts to the platforms.

== Transport services ==
Oberhausen-Sterkrade station is served (as of 2020) by the following lines (the Wupper-Lippe-Express operates on weekdays only):

| Line | Line name | Route | Frequency |
|---|---|---|---|
| RE 5 | Rhein-Express | Emmerich – Wesel – Oberhausen-Sterkrade – Duisburg – Düsseldorf – Cologne – Bonn – Remagen – Andernach – Koblenz | 60 mins |
| RE 19 | Rhein-IJssel-Express | Arnhem – Emmerich – Wesel – Oberhausen-Sterkrade – Oberhausen – Duisburg – Düsseldorf | 60 mins |
| RE 49 | Wupper-Lippe-Express | Wesel – Oberhausen-Sterkrade – Oberhausen – Mülheim – Essen – Wuppertal-Vohwinkel – Wuppertal | 60 mins |

=== Buses and trams ===
The station is served by numerous bus routes. It is served by tramline 112 on the Oberhausen-Sterkrade, Neumarkt – Oberhausen-Sterkrade Bf – Oberhausen Hauptbahnhof – Mülheim – Hauptfriedhof route.

== See also ==
- List of railway stations in North Rhine-Westphalia
