= Essen-Dellwig station =

Railway station in Germany

Essen Dellwig
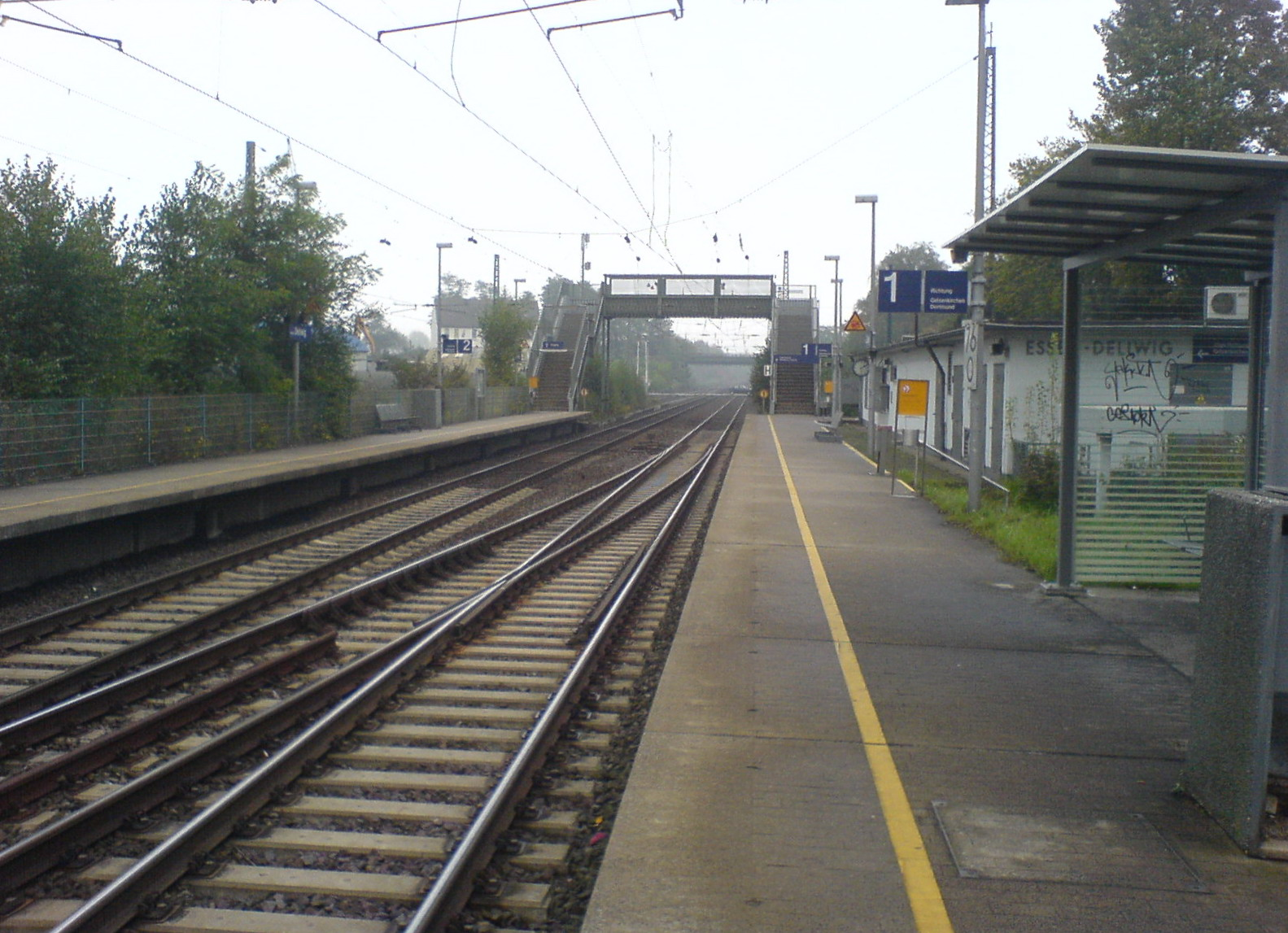

General information
- Location: Essen, NRW; Germany
- Coordinates: 51°29′16″N 6°55′17″E
- Owner: DB Netz
- Operator: DB Station&Service
- Lines: Duisburg–Dortmund (KBS 450.2)
- Platforms: 2 side platforms
- Tracks: 2
- Train operators: DB Regio NRW

Construction
- Accessible: Platform 1 only

Other information
- Station code: 1698
- DS100 code: EEDL
- Category: 6
- Fare zone: VRR: 352
- Website: www.bahnhof.de

History
- Opened: 1 May 1891

Services
Preceding station	DB Regio NRW	Following station
Oberhausen Hbf towards Duisburg Hbf	RB 32	Essen-Bergeborbeck towards Dortmund Hbf
Preceding station	VIAS	Following station
Oberhausen Hbf towards Mönchengladbach Hbf	RB 35	Essen-Bergeborbeck towards Gelsenkirchen Hbf
Location
- Location within North Rhine-Westphalia

Essen-Dellwig station is located in the city of Essen in the German state of North Rhine-Westphalia on the Duisburg–Dortmund railway, opened by the Cologne-Minden Railway Company on 15 May 1847. The station opened on 1 May 1891. It is classified by Deutsche Bahn as a category 6 station. The station is located 300m away from Essen-Dellwig Ost station.

The station is served by Regionalbahn services RB 32 (Rhein-Emscher-Bahn) and RB 35 (Emscher-Niederrhein-Bahn), providing a service every 30 minutes during the day on weekdays.

It is also served by tram lines 103 of the Essen Stadtbahn, operated at 10-minute intervals and bus routes 166 and 185, operated by Ruhrbahn at 20-minute intervals.
