= Duisburg-Obermeiderich station =

Railway station in Duisburg, Germany

Duisburg Obermeiderich
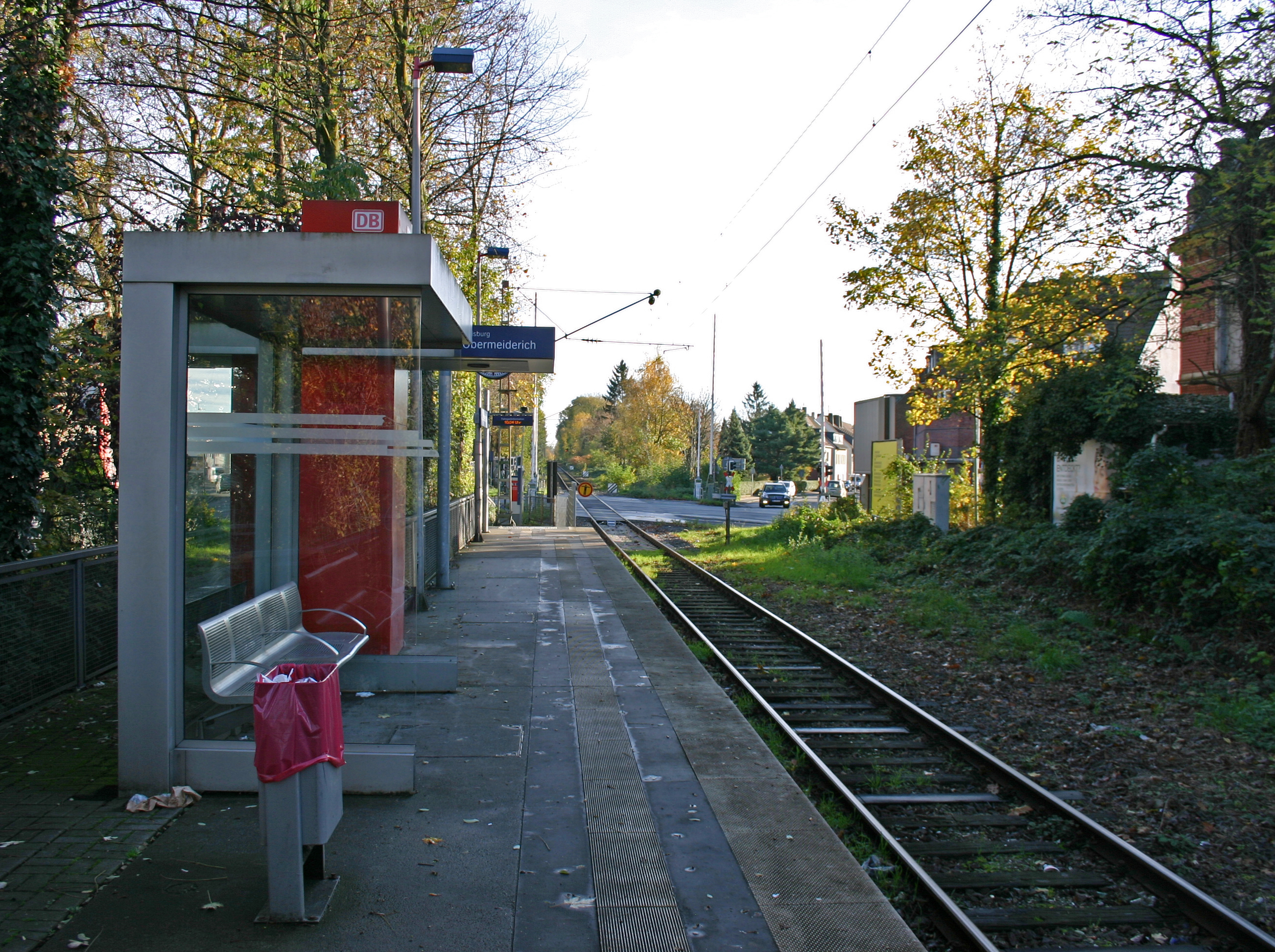

General information
- Location: Duisburg, NRW, Germany
- Coordinates: 51°28′07″N 6°49′14″E
- Owner: DB Netz
- Operator: DB Station&Service
- Line: Oberhausen–Duisburg-Ruhrort railway
- Platforms: 1 side platform
- Tracks: 1
- Train operators: NordWestBahn

Construction
- Accessible: Yes

Other information
- Fare zone: VRR: 230 and 240
- Website: www.bahnhof.de

Services
Preceding station	NordWestBahn	Following station
Duisburg-Meiderich Ost towards Duisburg-Ruhrort	RB 36	Oberhausen Hbf Terminus
Location
- Location within North Rhine-Westphalia

Duisburg-Obermeiderich is a railway station in Duisburg, North Rhine-Westphalia, Germany. Most of the travellers using Duisburg-Obermeiderich live in the adjacent district of Oberhausen, Alstaden.

== The Station ==
The station is located on the Oberhausen–Duisburg-Ruhrort railway and is served by RB services operated by NordWestBahn.

== Train services ==
The following services currently call at Duisburg-Obermeiderich:

Series	Operator	Route	Material	Frequency
RB 36 Ruhrort-Bahn	NordWestBahn	Duisburg-Ruhrort - Duisburg-Meiderich Süd - Duisburg-Meiderich Ost - Duisburg-Obermeiderich - Oberhausen Hbf	NWB LINT 41	2x per hour
