= Stadion an der Hafenstraße =

Stadium in Essen, Germany

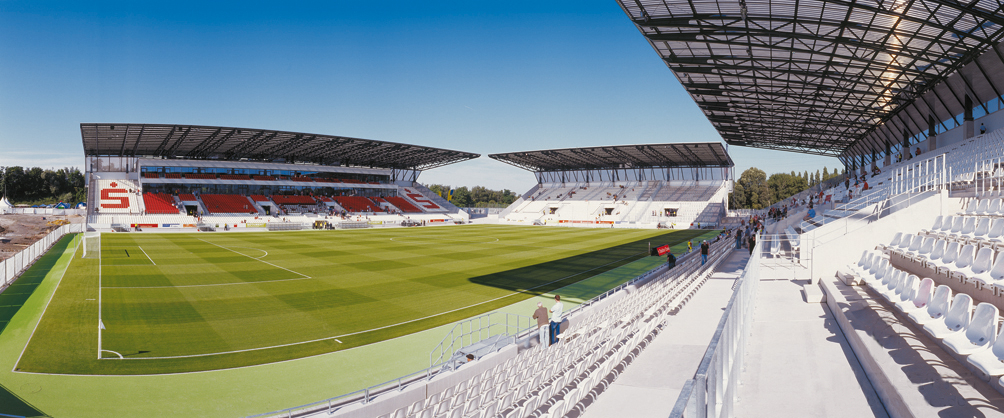
- Panoramic view, August 2012
- Interactive map of Stadion an der Hafenstraße
- Former names: Stadion Essen (2012–2022)
- Location: Essen, Germany
- Coordinates: 51°29′12″N 6°58′35″E
- Owner: City of Essen
- Operator: SBG Sportstätten Betriebsgesellschaft Stadt Essen mbH
- Capacity: 20,650
- Surface: Grass

Construction
- Groundbreaking: April 1, 2011
- Opened: August 12, 2012
- Cost: 64 million euro
- Architect: Plan Forward GmbH

Tenants
- Rot-Weiss Essen (2012–present); SGS Essen (2012–present)

Website
- www.stadion-essen.de

Stadion an der Hafenstraße, known as Stadion Essen until 2022, is a stadium in Essen, Germany. Located in the borough of Bergeborbeck, it has a capacity of 20,650 spectators. It is the home of Rot-Weiss Essen in the third-level men's 3. Liga and SGS Essen in the women's Frauen-Bundesliga and replaced Georg-Melches-Stadion.

== History ==
The stadium was officially opened on August 12, 2012, with a match between the under-19s of Rot-Weiss Essen and Borussia Dortmund (3-2). Afterwards the women's club SGS Essen played against 1. FFC Frankfurt. During the latter match, the Frankfurt players were replaced after 80 minutes by eleven male players from Rot-Weiss Essen.

The last stand was finished shortly before the start of the 2013/14 season. For this occasion, an opening match between Rot-Weiss Essen and Werder Bremen (0-2) was held on August 8 in front of 11,513 spectators.

The stadium was sold out for the first time on April 8, 2014, for the semi-final match of the Lower Rhine Cup between Rot-Weiss Essen and MSV Duisburg.

In November 2021, Rot-Weiss Essen purchased the rights to the stadium name. The stadium was renamed Stadion an der Hafenstraße in January 2022; the Georg-Melches-Stadion it replaced carried the same name from 1939 to 1964.

== See also ==
- List of football stadiums in Germany
- Lists of stadiums
