= Duisburg-Ruhrort station =

Railway station in Duisburg, Germany

Duisburg Ruhrort
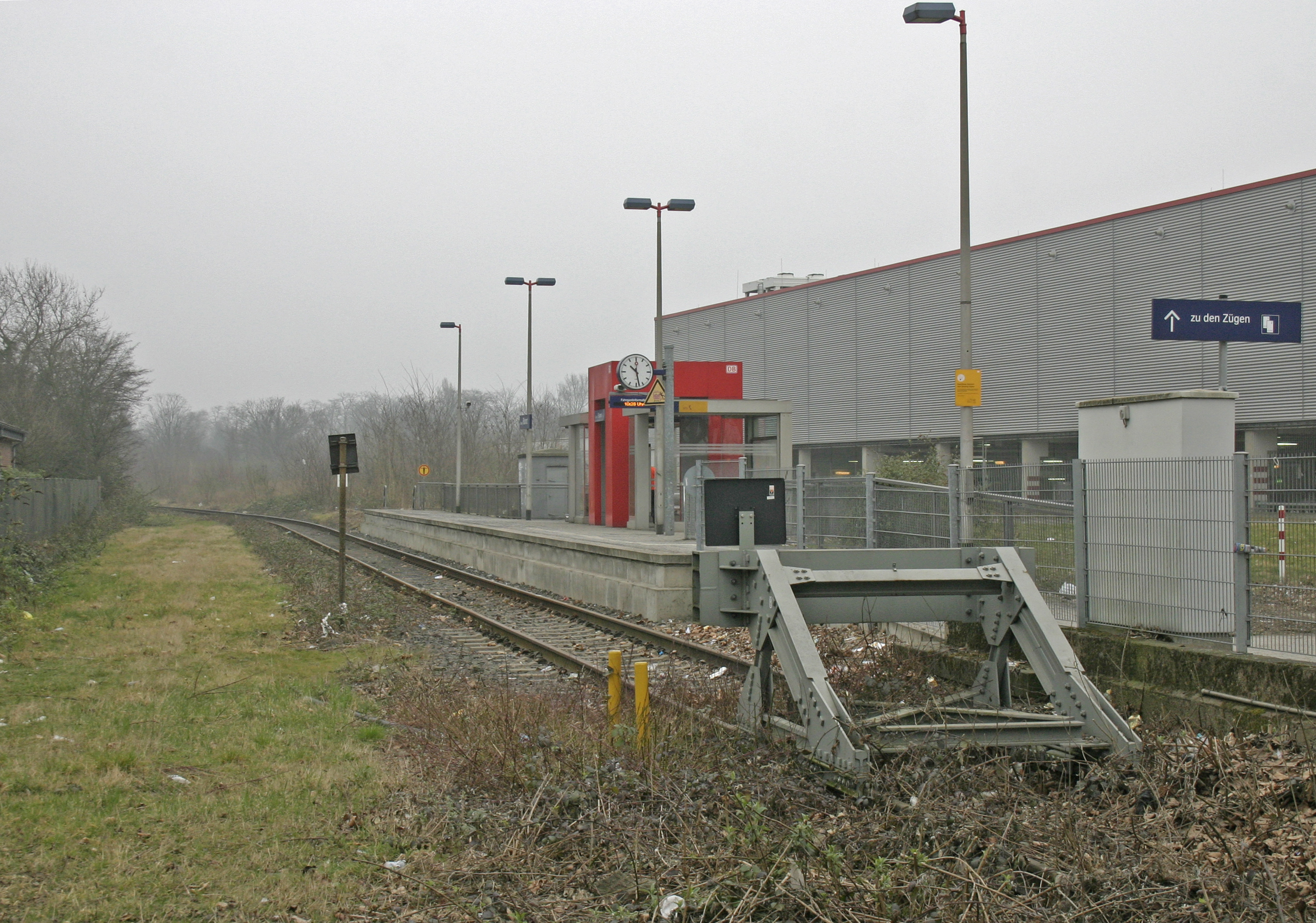

General information
- Location: Friedrich Ebert Str. 8, Duisburg; NRW, Germany
- Coordinates: 51°27′26″N 6°44′10″E
- Owner: DB Netz
- Operator: DB Station&Service
- Line: Oberhausen–Duisburg-Ruhrort railway
- Platforms: 1 side platform
- Tracks: 1
- Train operators: NordWestBahn

Construction
- Accessible: Yes

Other information
- Fare zone: VRR: 230
- Website: www.bahnhof.de

History
- Opened: 14 October 1848; 177 years ago

Services
Preceding station	NordWestBahn	Following station
Terminus	RB 36	Duisburg-Meiderich Süd towards Oberhausen Hbf
Preceding station	Straßenbahn Duisburg	Following station
Thyssen Tor 30 towards Obermarxloh Schleife	901	Friedrichsplatz towards Mülheim (Ruhr) Hbf
Location
- Location within North Rhine-Westphalia

Duisburg-Ruhrort is a railway station in Duisburg, North Rhine-Westphalia, Germany.

== The station ==
The station is located on the Oberhausen–Duisburg-Ruhrort railway and is served by RB services operated by NordWestBahn.

== Train services ==
The following services currently call at Duisburg-Ruhrort:

Series	Operator	Route	Material	Frequency
RB 36 Ruhrort-Bahn	NordWestBahn	Duisburg-Ruhrort - Duisburg-Meiderich Süd - Duisburg-Meiderich Ost - Duisburg-Obermeiderich - Oberhausen Hbf	NWB LINT 41	2x per hour

== Tram and bus services ==
The road in front of the station is also used by tram line 901, which stops directly at the station as well as at the station Friedrichsplatz, which is located in walking distance south of the station. Local bus lines 907 and 909 also stop in front of the station. At Friedrichsplatz, lines 911, 925 and 929 stop.
