= Essen-Bergeborbeck station =

Railway station in Essen, Germany

Essen Bergeborbeck
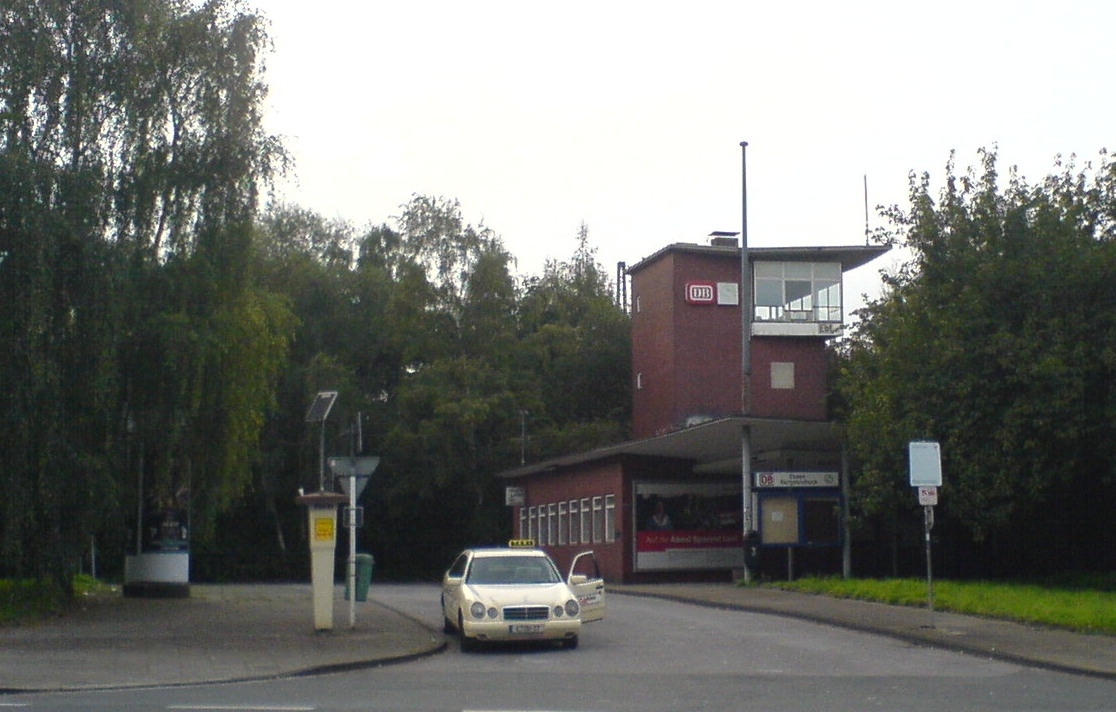

General information
- Location: Hafenstr. 7-11, Essen, NRW; Germany
- Coordinates: 51°28′49″N 6°58′37″E
- Owner: Deutsche Bahn
- Operator: DB Netz; DB Station&Service
- Lines: Duisburg–Dortmund (KBS 450.2)
- Platforms: 2

Construction
- Accessible: No

Other information
- Station code: 1695
- DS100 code: EEBE
- IBNR: 8001901
- Category: 6
- Fare zone: VRR: 352
- Website: www.bahnhof.de

History
- Opened: 15 May 1847

Services
Preceding station	DB Regio NRW	Following station
Essen-Dellwig towards Duisburg Hbf	RB 32	Essen-Altenessen towards Dortmund Hbf
Preceding station	VIAS	Following station
Essen-Dellwig towards Mönchengladbach Hbf	RB 35	Essen-Altenessen towards Gelsenkirchen Hbf
Location

Essen-Bergeborbeck station is located in the city of Essen in the German state of North Rhine-Westphalia on the Duisburg–Dortmund railway of the Cologne-Minden Railway Company. The line and station opened on 15 May 1847. It is classified by Deutsche Bahn as a category 6 station. Though it is named after nearby Bergeborbeck borough, it is located within the boundaries of Bochold, Essen.

The station is served by Regionalbahn services RB 32 (Rhein-Emscher-Bahn) and RB 35 (Emscher-Niederrhein-Bahn), providing a service every 30 minutes during the day on weekdays.

It is also served by tram lines 101 and 106 of the Essen Stadtbahn, operated at 10-minute intervals and bus route 196, operated by Ruhrbahn at 20-minute intervals.
