= Trams in Mülheim/Oberhausen =

Tramway network in Germany

Mülheim/Oberhausen tramway network
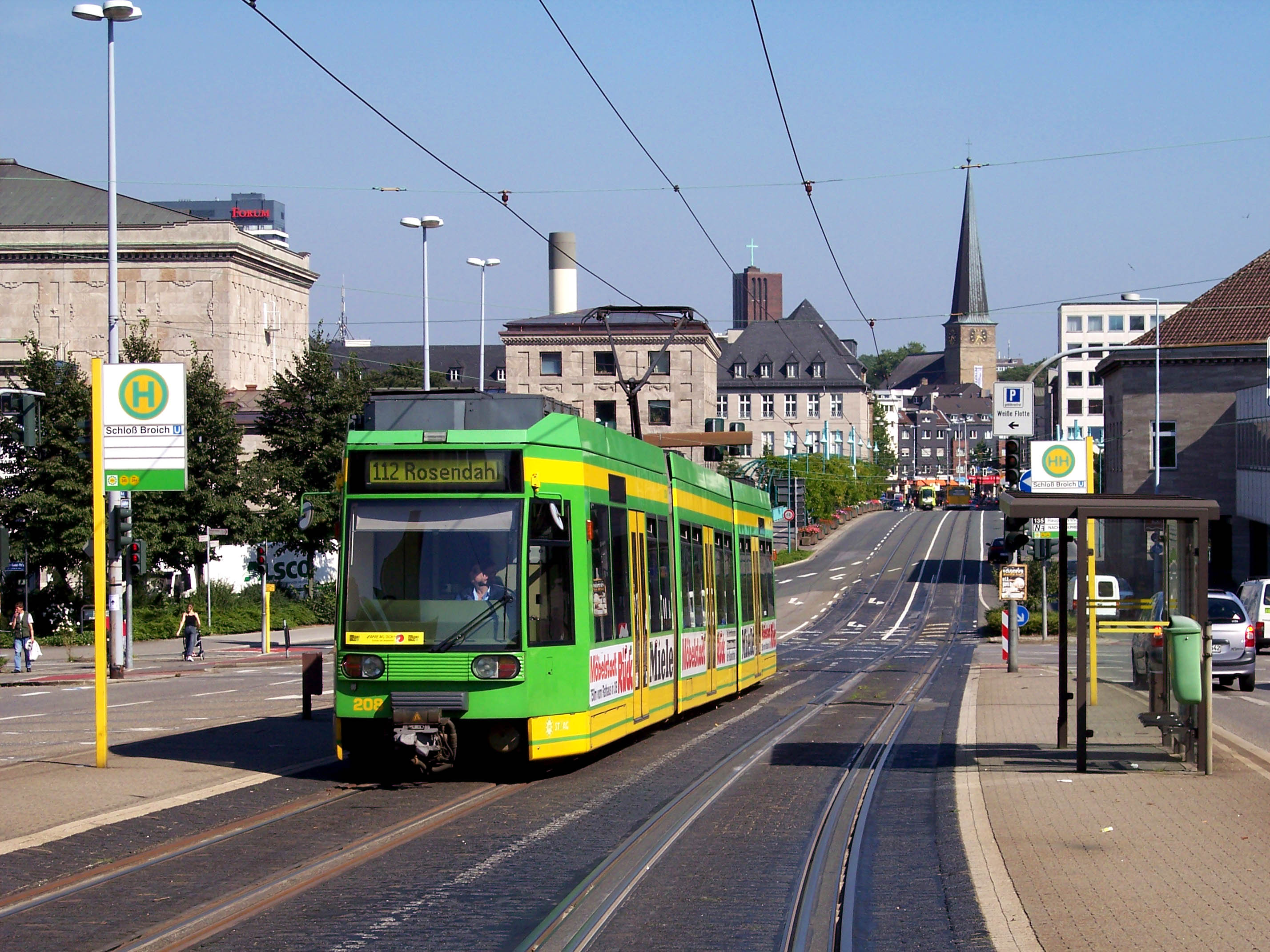
- An Oberhausen tram en route to the Mülheim depot.

Operation
- Locale: Mülheim an der Ruhr / Oberhausen, North Rhine-Westphalia, Germany
- Open: 9 July 1897; (Mülheim); 4 April 1897; (Oberhausen)
- Status: Operational
- Lines: 3 + 1 (total line length 36.2 km (22.5 mi))
- Operators: Ruhrbahn; Stadtwerke Oberhausen

Infrastructure
- Track gauge: 1,000 mm (3 ft 3 3/8 in)
- Propulsion system: Electricity
- Electrification: 750 V DC

Statistics
- Route length: 32 km (20 mi)
Overview
The network in 2015 (dark blue: Stadtbahn).
- Website: https://ruhrbahn.de/index.php?id=665 Ruhrbahn (in German)] STOAG

The Mülheim/Oberhausen tramway network is a network of tramways forming part of the public transport system focused on Mülheim an der Ruhr and Oberhausen, two cities in the federal state of North Rhine-Westphalia, Germany.

Opened in 1897, the network is operated by Ruhrbahn and Stadtwerke Oberhausen (STOAG), and integrated in the Verkehrsverbund Rhein-Ruhr (VRR).

== Lines ==
As of 2015, the network had the following lines:

Line	Route	Headway (rush hour)	Notes
102	Uhlenhorst – Stadtmitte – Mülheim Hbf – Oberdümpten	10'	Metre gauge
104	MH Hauptfriedhof – Max-Planck-Institute – Stadtmitte – Rathausmarkt – Grenze Borbeck – E Abzweig Aktienstraße	20' Hauptfriedhof – Stadtmitte	Metre gauge
104	MH Hauptfriedhof – Max-Planck-Institute – Stadtmitte – Rathausmarkt – Grenze Borbeck – E Abzweig Aktienstraße	10' Stadtmitte – Grenze Borbeck	Metre gauge
104	MH Hauptfriedhof – Max-Planck-Institute – Stadtmitte – Rathausmarkt – Grenze Borbeck – E Abzweig Aktienstraße	20' Grenze Borbeck – E-Abzweig Aktienstr.	Metre gauge
112/NE12	MH Hauptfriedhof – Kaiserplatz – Stadtmitte – Landwehr – Oberhausen Hbf – Feuerwache – Neue Mitte – Eisenheim – OB Neumarkt	10' 112 Hauptfriedhof – Landwehr	Metre gauge
112/NE12	MH Hauptfriedhof – Kaiserplatz – Stadtmitte – Landwehr – Oberhausen Hbf – Feuerwache – Neue Mitte – Eisenheim – OB Neumarkt	20' 112 Landwehr – OLGA-Park (morning rush hour 10')	Metre gauge
112/NE12	MH Hauptfriedhof – Kaiserplatz – Stadtmitte – Landwehr – Oberhausen Hbf – Feuerwache – Neue Mitte – Eisenheim – OB Neumarkt	20' 112 OLGA-Park - Neumarkt	Metre gauge
112/NE12	MH Hauptfriedhof – Kaiserplatz – Stadtmitte – Landwehr – Oberhausen Hbf – Feuerwache – Neue Mitte – Eisenheim – OB Neumarkt	60' NE12 Kaiserplatz – OB-OLGA-Park	Metre gauge
112/NE12	MH Hauptfriedhof – Kaiserplatz – Stadtmitte – Landwehr – Oberhausen Hbf – Feuerwache – Neue Mitte – Eisenheim – OB Neumarkt	Occasional trips NE12 OB-OLGA-Park – OB-Neumarkt	Metre gauge
901	DU-Obermarxloh – Marxloh – Thyssen Verwaltung – Beeck – Neanderstr. – Laar – Thyssen Tor 30 – Ruhrort – Albertstr. – DU-Stadtmitte – Jakobstr. – Mülheim/Ruhr	15'	Standard gauge Duisburg tramway line

The former line 110 (Styrum, Friesenstr. – Hauptfriedhof) was replaced by bus line 128 on October 4, 2015.

== See also ==
- List of town tramway systems in Germany
- Trams in Germany
