= Oberhausen Hauptbahnhof =

Railway station in North Rhine-Westphalia, Germany

Oberhausen Hbf
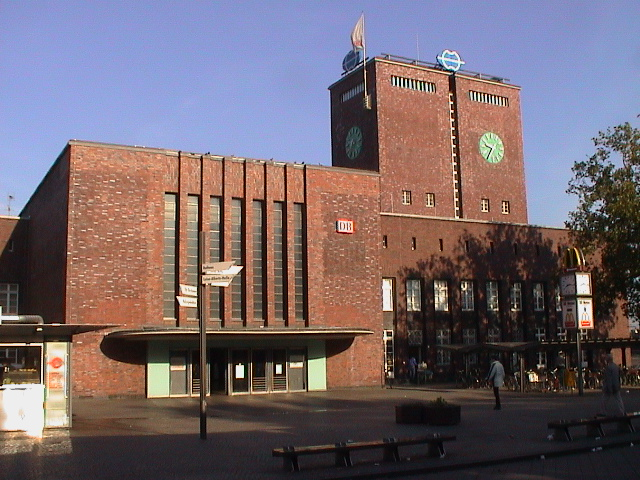
- Station entrance

General information
- Location: Willy-Brandt-Platz 1, Oberhausen, NRW; Germany
- Coordinates: 51°28′27″N 6°51′13″E
- Owner: Deutsche Bahn
- Operator: DB Netz; DB Station&Service
- Lines: Duisburg–Dortmund; Oberhausen–Arnhem; Oberhausen–DU-Ruhrort; Oberhausen-Mülheim-Styrum
- Platforms: 14 (10 in use)

Construction
- Accessible: Yes
- Architect: Schwingel and Herrmann
- Architectural style: Modernism

Other information
- Station code: 4648
- DS100 code: EOB
- IBNR: 8000286
- Category: 2
- Fare zone: VRR: 240
- Website: www.bahnhof.de

History
- Opened: 1847

Services
Preceding station	DB Fernverkehr	Following station
Duisburg Hbf towards Emden Außenhafen or Norddeich Mole	IC 35	Gelsenkirchen Hbf towards Köln Hbf
Duisburg Hbf towards Frankfurt (Main) Hbf	ICE 78	Arnhem Centraal towards Amsterdam Centraal
Preceding station		Following station
Duisburg Hbf towards Düsseldorf Hbf	RE 3	Essen-Altenessen towards Hamm (Westf) Hbf
Preceding station	National Express Germany	Following station
Duisburg Hbf towards Koblenz Hbf	RE 5 (Rhein-Express)	Oberhausen–Sterkrade towards Wesel
Preceding station	DB Regio NRW	Following station
Oberhausen–Sterkrade towards Wesel	RE 49	Mülheim-Styrum towards Wuppertal Hbf
Duisburg Hbf Terminus	RB 32	Essen-Dellwig towards Dortmund Hbf
Preceding station	NordWestBahn	Following station
Duisburg Hbf towards Moers	RE 44	Oberhausen-Osterfeld Süd towards Bottrop Hbf
Duisburg-Obermeiderich towards Duisburg-Ruhrort	RB 36	Terminus
Preceding station	VIAS	Following station
Duisburg Hbf towards Düsseldorf Hbf	RE 19	Oberhausen-Sterkrade towards Arnhem Centraal or Bocholt
Duisburg Hbf towards Mönchengladbach Hbf	RB 35	Essen-Dellwig towards Gelsenkirchen Hbf
Preceding station	Rhine-Ruhr S-Bahn	Following station
Terminus	S3	Mülheim-Styrum towards Hattingen (Ruhr) Mitte
Preceding station	Trams in Mülheim/Oberhausen	Following station
Feuerwache towards Oberhausen Neumarkt	112	Luise-Albertz-Halle towards Hauptfriedhof
Location

Oberhausen Hauptbahnhof is a railway station in Oberhausen, North Rhine-Westphalia, Germany. The station was opened in 1847 and is located on the Duisburg–Dortmund railway, Arnhem-Oberhausen railway, Oberhausen–Duisburg-Ruhrort railway and Oberhausen-Mülheim-Styrum railway and is served by ICE, IC, RE and RB services operated by Deutsche Bahn, Abellio Deutschland, NordWestBahn and Eurobahn.

== History ==
The station was opened in 1847 as part of the trunk line of the former Cologne-Minden Railway Company. The first station building at its present location—a simple half-timbered building and loading facility—was named after the nearby Schloss Oberhausen (palace) and opened on 15 May 1847. It was the first station on the territory of the former Bürgermeisterei of Borbeck; the city of Oberhausen did not exist at this time. The station initially serviced the developing heavy industry, centred on the Gutehoffnungshütte steel works. The entrepreneur Franz Haniel had influence with the Prussian government and the railway company and gained a rail connection to the Lipper heath, now central Oberhausen. After the opening of the station, the company relocated the Altenberg zinc smelter near to the station.

In 1850, the administration of the Zeche Concordia colliery was established in the station building. In 1854, a more elaborate station building was erected. In 1866, the entrance building of the Bergisch-Märkische Railway Company station was built only a few metres away. Other railway companies and new lines were built subsequently.

By 1880, Oberhausen had become one of the most important railway junctions in the Ruhr area (including Oberhausen West yard, Osterfeld yard was at that time still independent). In the wake of the nationalisation of the Prussian railways in the early 1880s, lines were connected and central stations were established where possible. The Bergisch-Märkische and Cologne-Minden stations were merged in 1888 into a prestigious new station with tunnels connecting the platforms.

Between 1930 and 1934, the current station building was built in the modernist style. Oberhausen architect Schwingel and supervisor of the Deutsche Reichsbahn railway division (Reichsbahndirektion) of Essen, Karl Herrmann, designed the current building in simple cubic forms.

In the Second World War, the station was repeatedly hit by bombs and shells and heavily damaged. The entrance hall building was only restored to operation in 1954 in a heavily modified form, with the Bali-Kino cinema above a false ceiling and a small shopping arcade.

As part of a project called Internationale Bauausstellung Emscher Park ("international building exhibition Emscher Park"), Oberhausen station and its environs were completely renovated and redecorated in 1993. The entrance hall was extensively restored to its original form and the cinema and the shopping arcade were removed. The platform tracks were reduced from 14 to 10. The disused railway mail terminal was demolished and that area along with the former platform of tracks 4 and 5 were converted into the platform of the LVR Industrial Museum Oberhausen. The Die drei Lebensalter (three ages) relief by Ernst Müller Blensdorf was returned to the station. The pedestrian tunnel under the railway tracks was modernised and extended to an entrance on the western side. The headquarters of the Landschaftsverband Rheinland (Rhineland Industrial Museum, LRV), opened in 1997, and the western district thus receive direct access from the station. The reconstruction also included the redesign of the station forecourt with a central bus terminal and the construction of a park and ride car park on the western side.

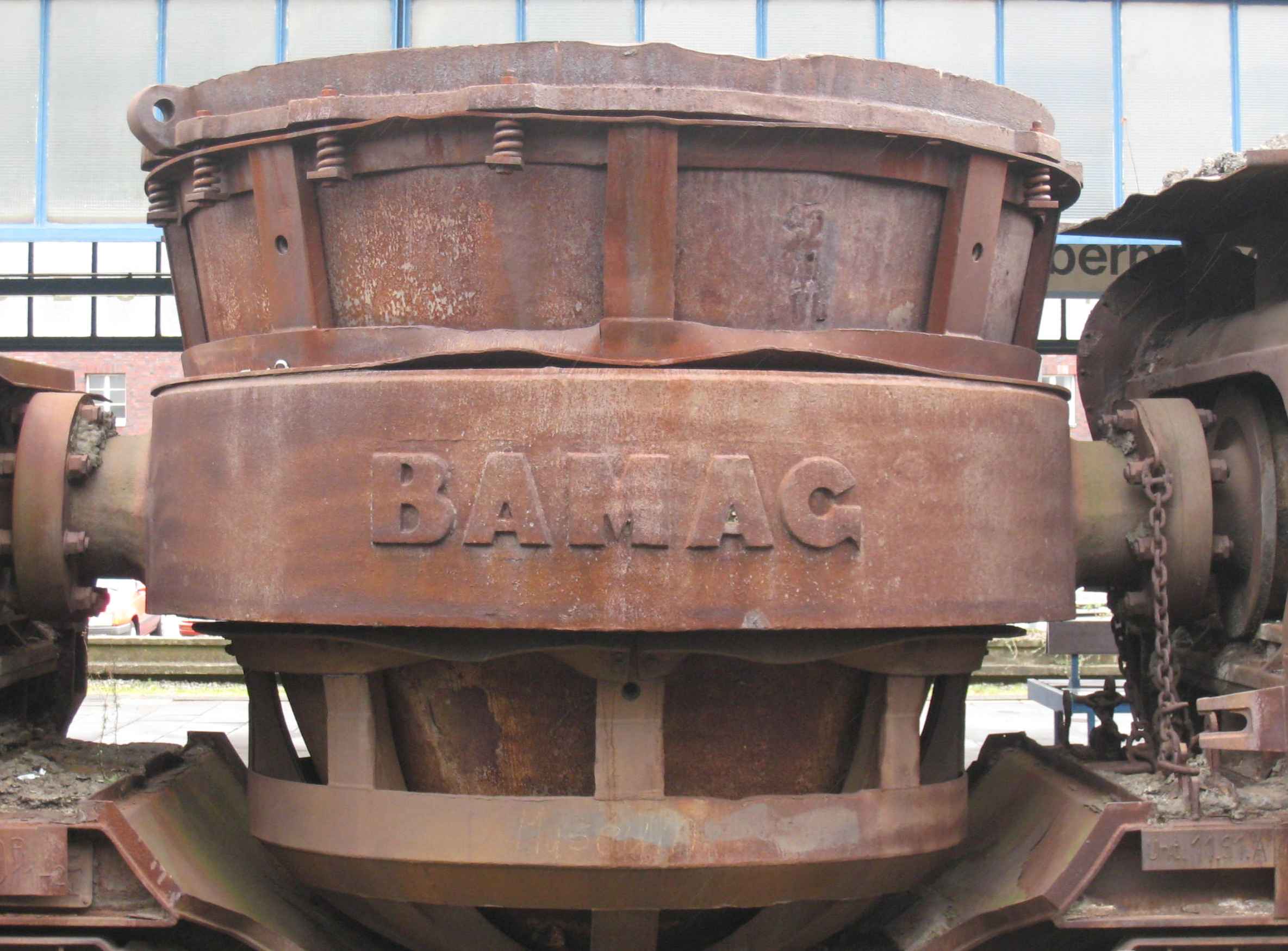
Wagon for the transport of molten slag on the Museum platform

== Rail services ==
In the 2026 timetable, the following services stopped at the station:

Line	Line name	Route	Frequency
IC 35		Norddeich Mole – Emden – Rheine – Münster – Recklinghausen – Wanne-Eickel – Gelsenkirchen – Oberhausen – Duisburg – Düsseldorf Airport – Düsseldorf – Cologne	Every 2 hours
ICE 78		Amsterdam – Oberhausen – Duisburg – Düsseldorf – Cologne – Frankfurt Airport – Frankfurt	Every 2 hours
RE 3	Rhein-Emscher-Express	Düsseldorf – Duisburg – Oberhausen – Herne-Wanne-Eickel – Gelsenkirchen – Herne – Dortmund – Hamm	Hourly
RE 5	Rhein-Express	Wesel – Oberhausen – Duisburg – Düsseldorf Airport – Düsseldorf – Cologne – Bonn – Remagen – Andernach – Koblenz	Hourly
RE 19	Rhein-IJssel-Express	Arnhem – Emmerich – Wesel – Oberhausen – Duisburg – Düsseldorf Airport – Düsseldorf	Hourly
RB 32	Rhein-Emscher-Bahn	Duisburg – Essen-Altenessen – Gelsenkirchen – Wanne-Eickel – Castrop-Rauxel – Dortmund	Hourly
RB 35	Emscher-Niederrhein-Bahn	Gelsenkirchen – Oberhausen – Duisburg – Krefeld – Mönchengladbach	Hourly
RB 36	Ruhrort-Bahn	Oberhausen – Duisburg-Meiderich Süd – Duisburg-Ruhrort	Every 30 mins (weekdays), hourly (weekends and public holidays)
RE 44	Fossa-Emscher-Express	Moers – Rheinhausen – Duisburg – Oberhausen – Bottrop	Hourly
RE 49	Wupper-Lippe-Express	Wesel – Oberhausen – Mülheim – Essen – Wuppertal-Vohwinkel – Wuppertal	Hourly (weekdays)
S3		Oberhausen – Mülheim (Ruhr) – Essen – Hattingen	Every 30 min

== Bus services ==
Night Service (only from evening to early morning):

- NE1 (Oberhausen Fröbelplatz - Oberhausen Hirschkamp)
- NE2 (Oberhausen Dümpten - Oberhausen H. Böll Gesamtschule)
- NE3 (Oberhausen Sterkrade - Oberhausen Fröbelplatz)
- NE5 (Oberhausen Sterkrade - Oberhausen Hbf)
- NE6 (Oberhausen Sterkrade - Oberhausen Ruhrpark)
- NE11 (Oberhausen Hbf - Essen Hbf)
- NE12 (Oberhausen OLGA-Park - Mülheim Kaiserplatz)
- NE21 (Oberhausen Hbf - Bottrop ZOB Berliner Platz)

Regular Bus Service:

- 122 (Oberhausen Goerdelerstraße - Mülheim Hbf) every 20/30/30 Minutes
- 136 (Oberhausen A.-Frank -Realschule - Essen Erbach) every 60 Minutes
- 143 (Oberhausen Fröbelplatz - Essen Borbeck Bf) every 20/30/30 Minutes
- 185 (Oberhausen City Forum - Essen Borbeck Bf) every 20/30/30 Minutes
- 935 (Oberhausen Sterkrade - Oberhausen A.-Frank -Realschule) every 60 Minutes
- 939 (Oberhausen Marina/Sea Life - Duisburg Hbf) every 60 Minutes
- 955 (Oberhausen H. Böll Gesamtschule - Oberhausen A.-Frank -Realschule) every 60 Minutes
- 957 (Oberhausen Sterkrade Bf - Oberhausen Tulpenstraße) every 20/30/30 Minutes
- 958 (Oberhausen Sterkrade Bf - Oberhausen Hauptbahnhof) every 20/30/30 Minutes
- 960 (Oberhausen Dümpten/OB-Anne-Frank-Realschule - Oberhausen Holten Bf) every 20/30/30 Minutes
- 976 (Oberhausen Everslohstraße - Mülheim Heifeskamp) every 20/30/30 Minutes
- 995 (Oberhausen A.-Frank -Realschule - Duisburg Marxloh Pollmann) every 60/60/- Minutes

960: On Sundays or evening Monday to Saturday the line is split from Marktstraße changing the destination to Dümpten or Anne-Frank-Realschule

== Tram Services ==
- 112 (Oberhausen Neumarkt - Oberhausen-Sterkrade Station - Oberhausen Hbf - Mülheim) every 10 Minutes

== Gallery ==
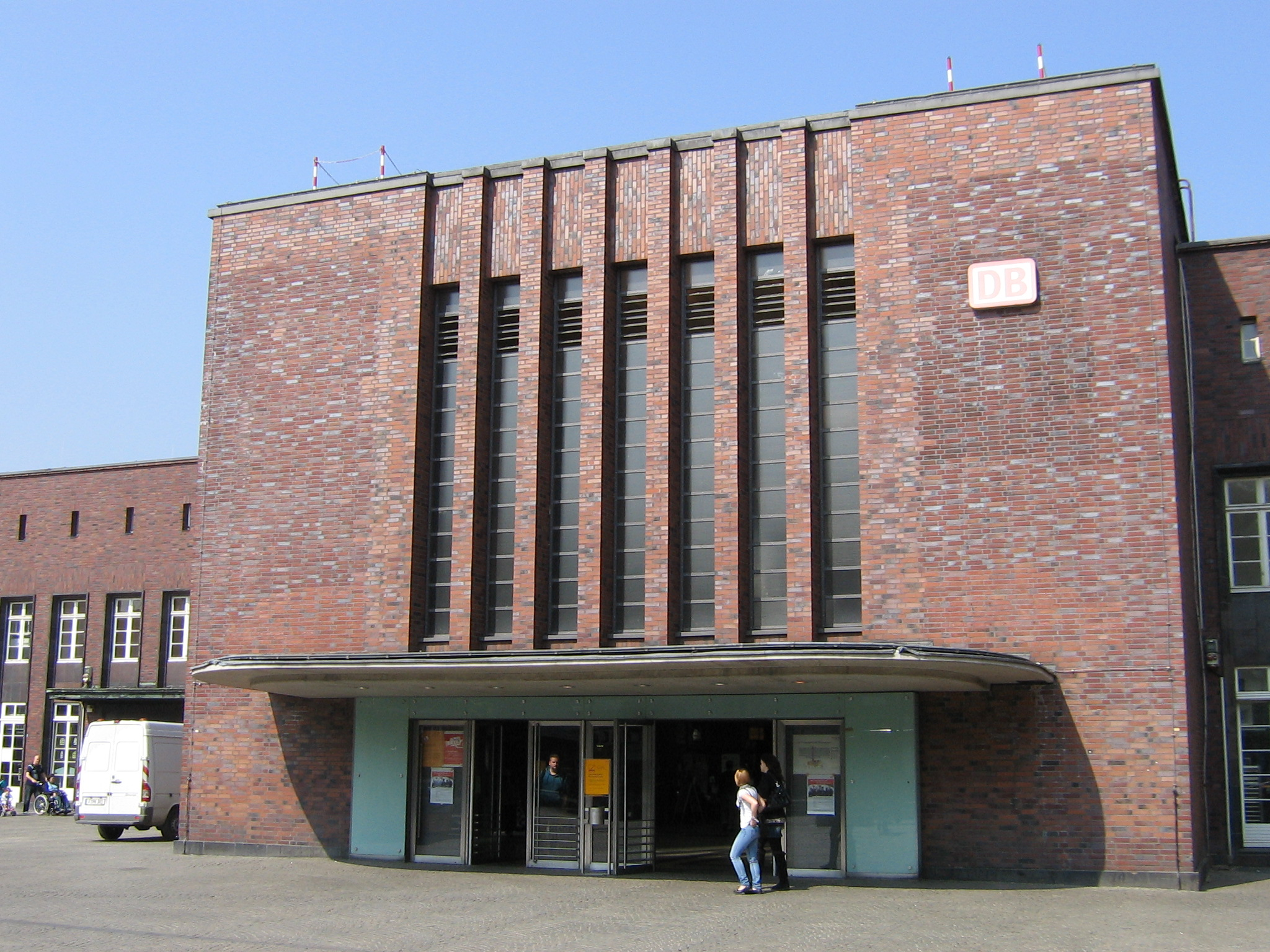
The entrance into the station

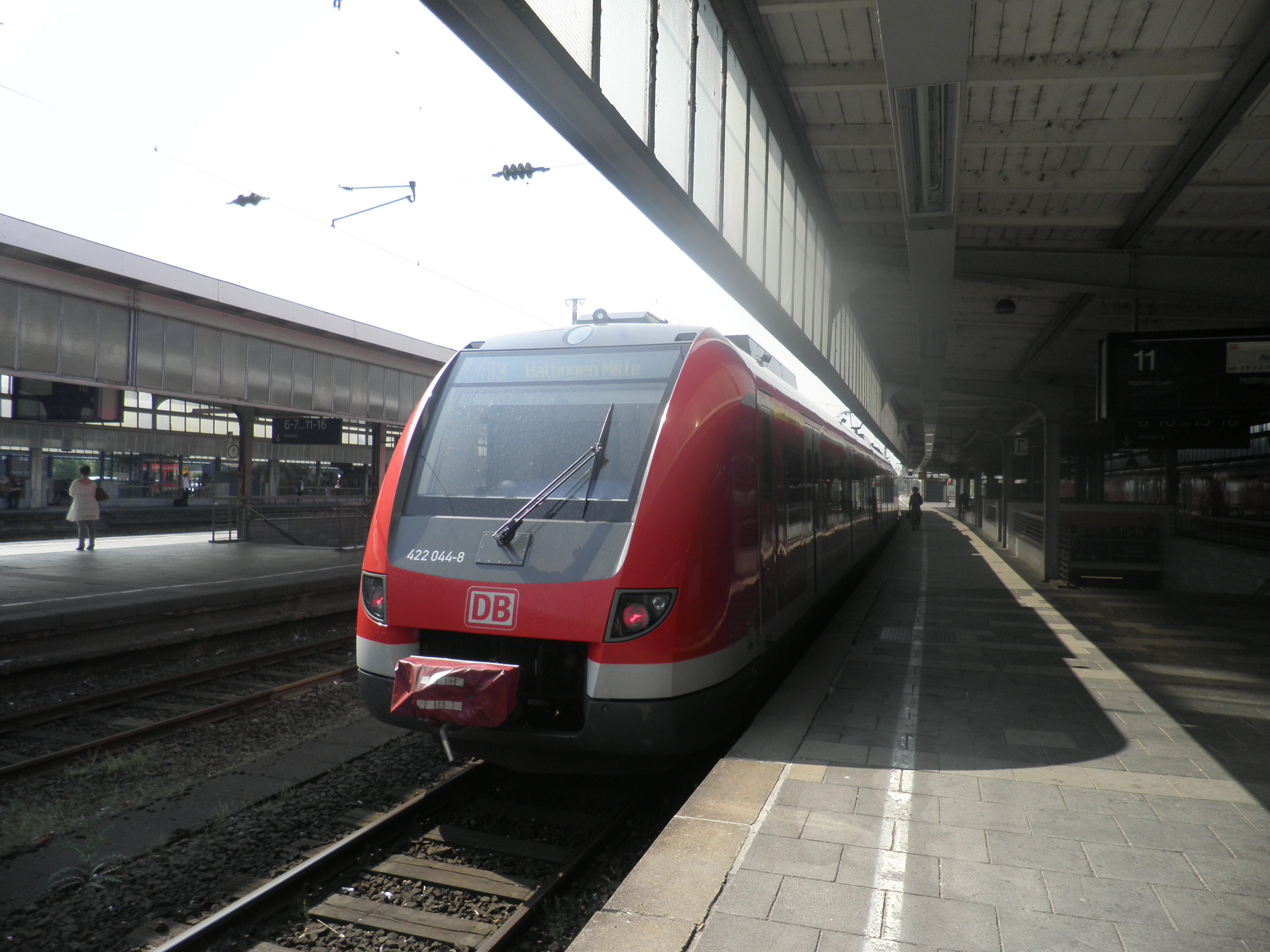
An S3 service at Oberhausen Hbf

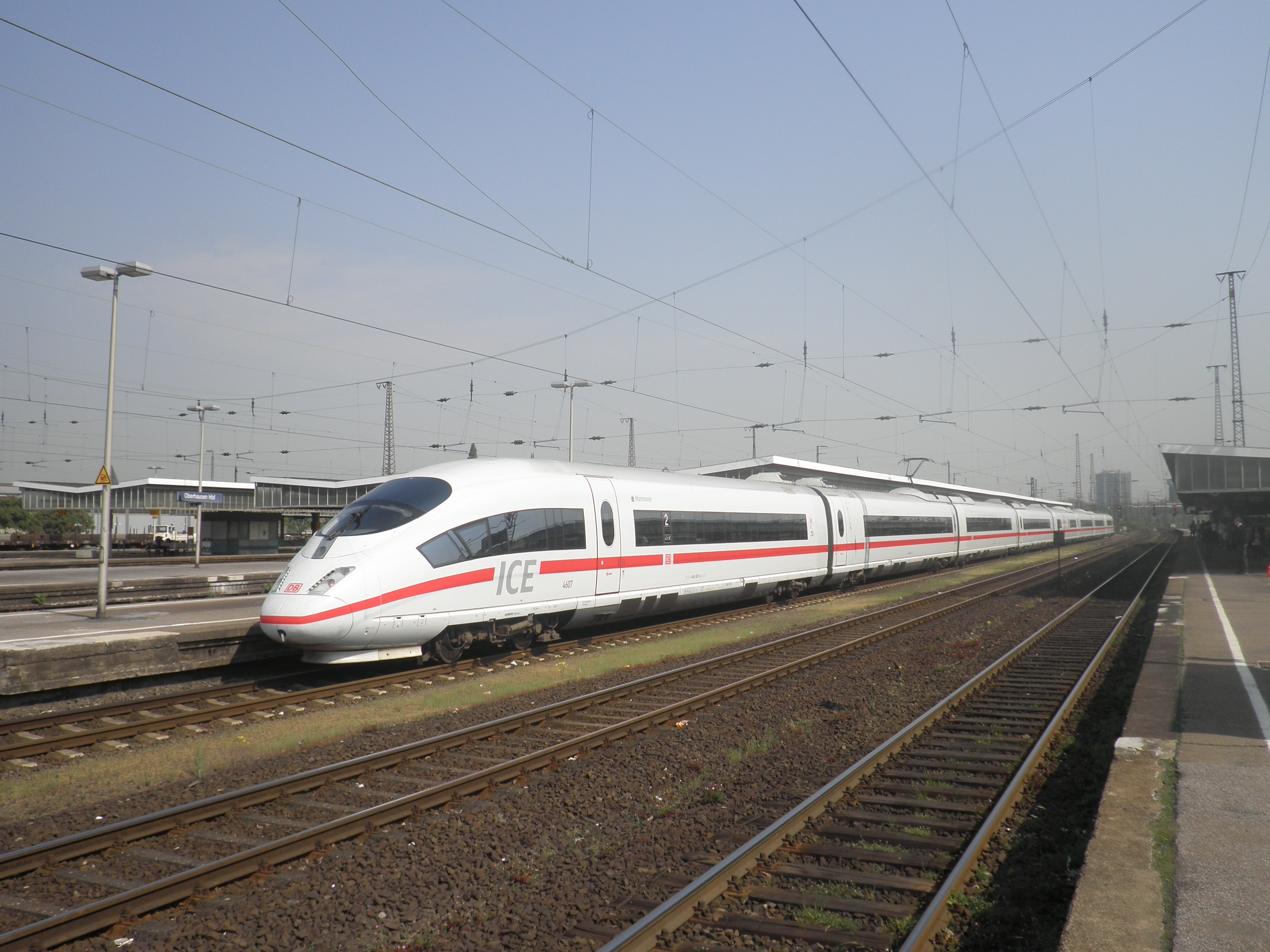
An ICE on a service to Amsterdam at Oberhausen Hbf

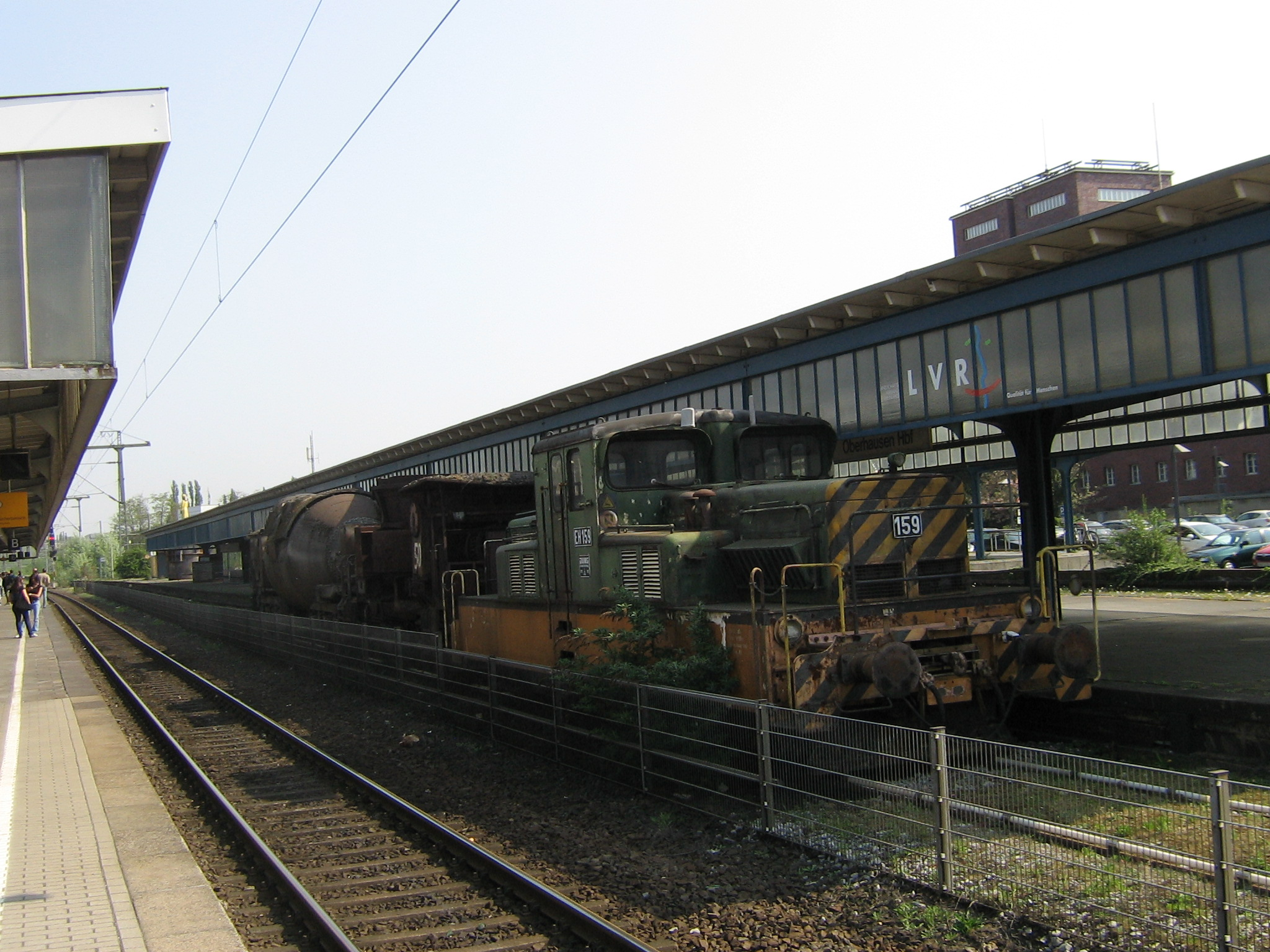
A Preserved Train which stays at Oberhausen Hbf

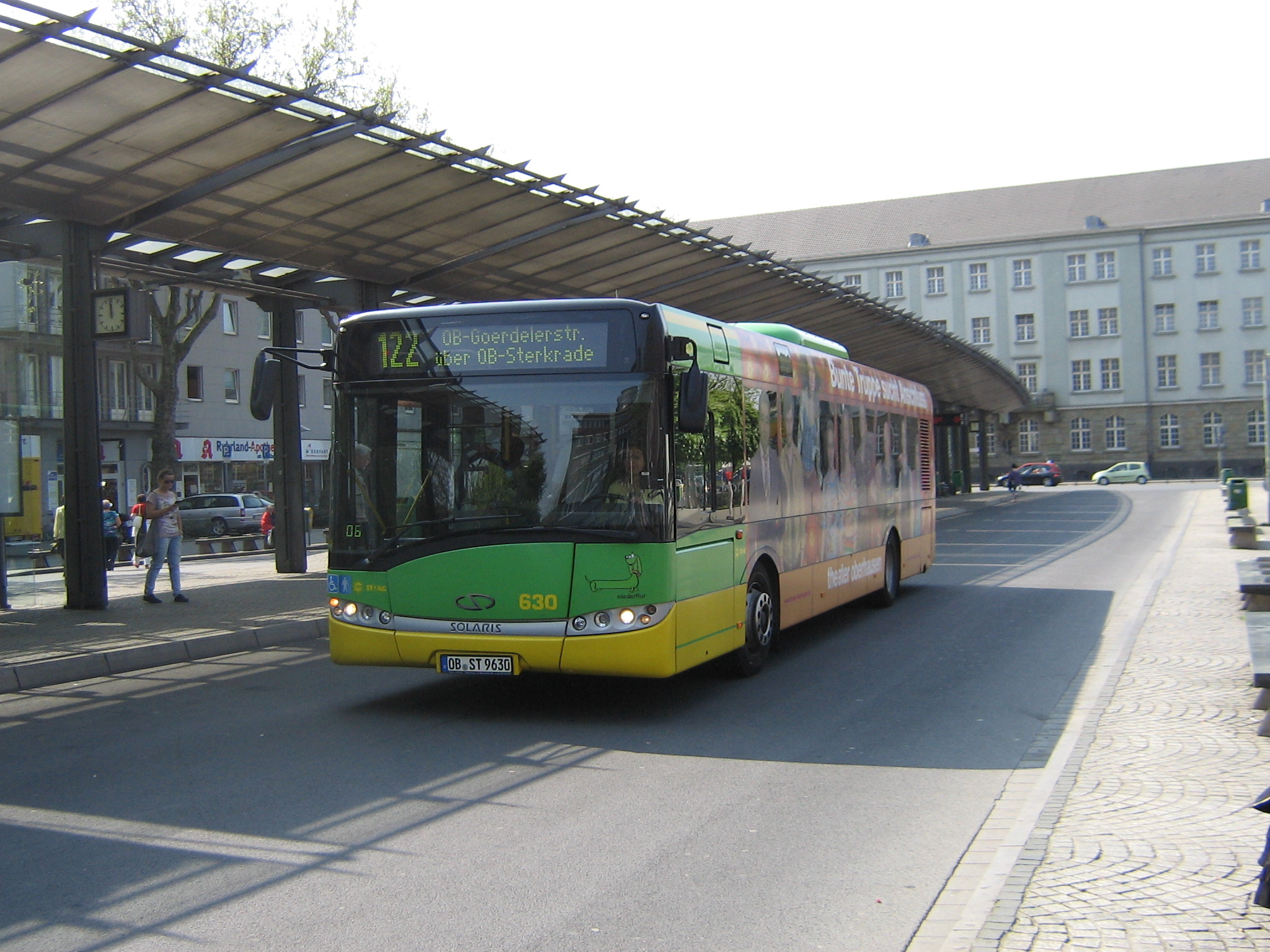
A Bus at the bus station of Oberhausen Hbf

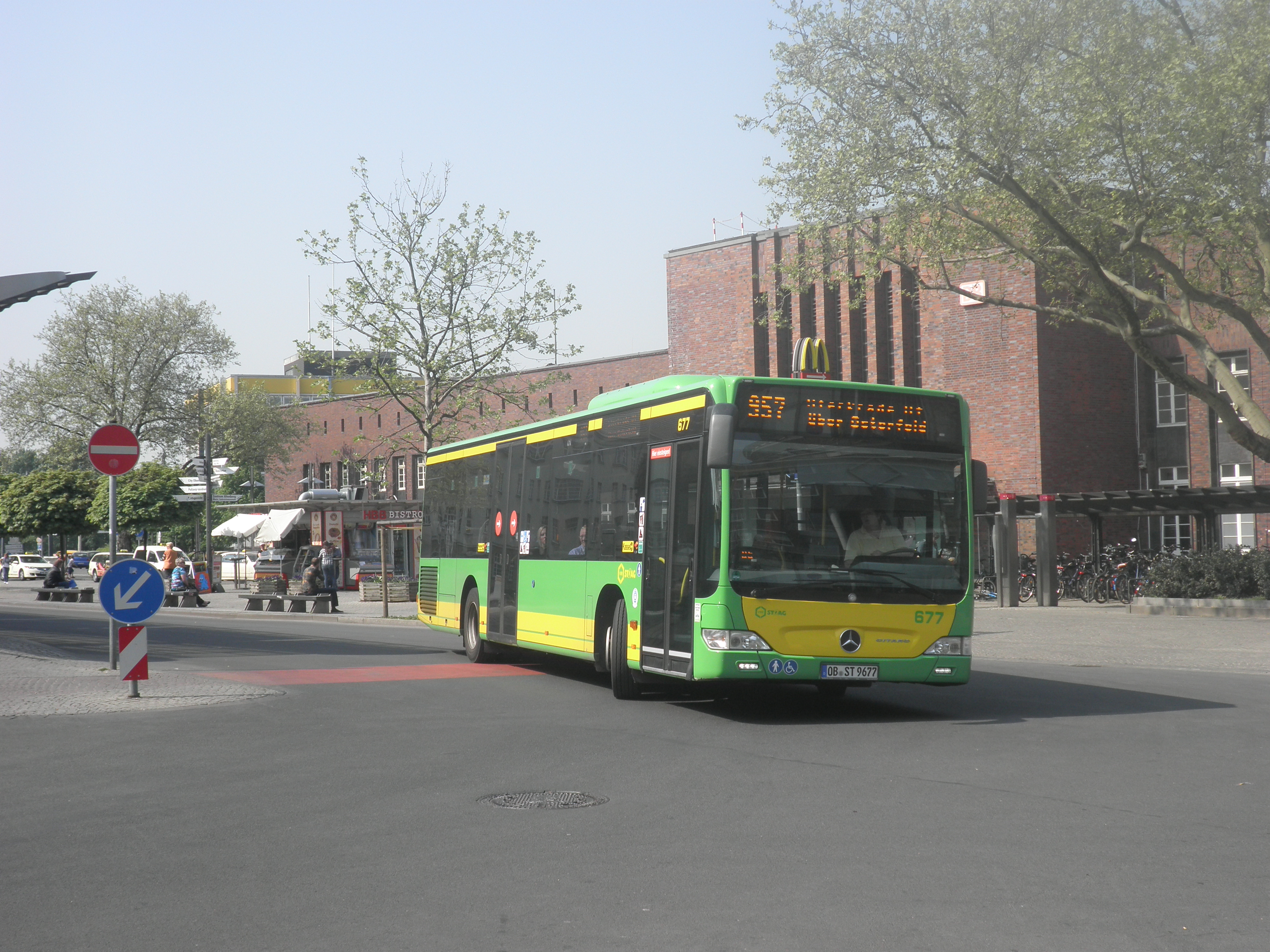
A Bus leaving the bus station of Oberhausen Hbf
