= Britta Altenkamp =

German politician (born 1964)

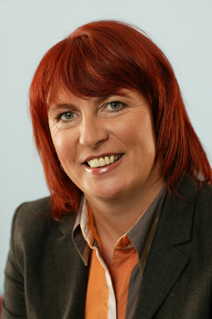
- Altenkamp in 2005

Member of Parliament, Landtag NRW
- Incumbent
- Assumed office 2000
- Preceded by: none (districts reformed)
- Constituency: district 67 / "Essen III"

City Council member
- In office 1994–2000
- Constituency: Essen

Personal details
- Born: 16 September 1964 (age 61) Essen, NRW, Germany
- Party: SPD
- Occupation: Politician
- Salary: €10,953 / month ($12,262 / month)
- Website: britta-altenkamp.de

Britta Altenkamp (born 16 September 1964) is a German politician from the Social Democratic Party of Germany. She is a member of the Landtag of North Rhine-Westphalia since 2000. From 1994 to 2000 she was a member of the Council of Essen City.
