= Nordviertel, Essen =

Coordinates: 51°28′14″N 7°00′53″E

Essen-Nordviertel
- Borough
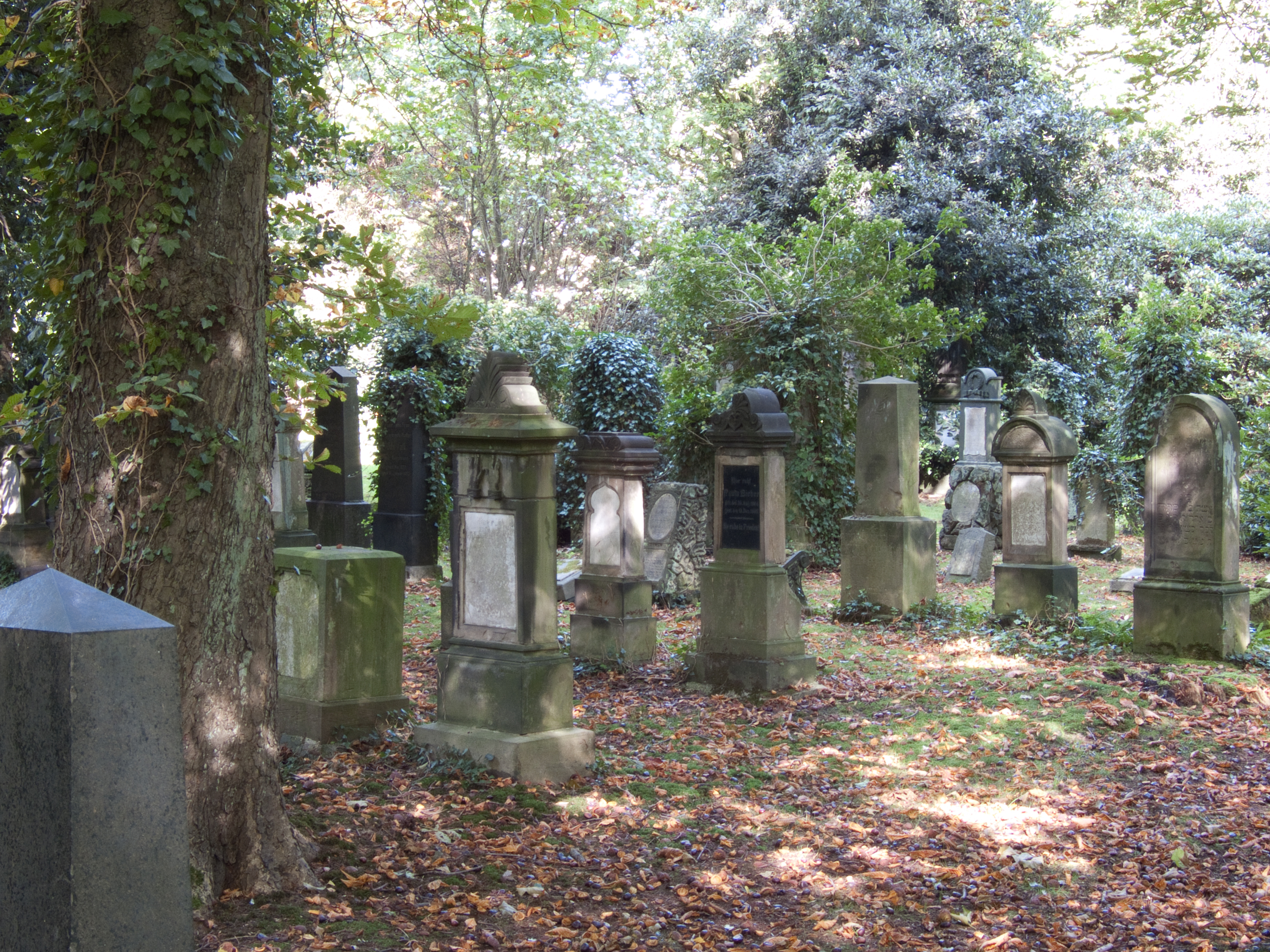
- Jewish cemetery, Assmannweg
- Interactive map of Essen-Nordviertel
- Country: Germany
- District: Stadtbezirk I Stadtmitte/Frillendorf/Huttrop

Area
  - Total: 2.86 km^{2} (1.10 sq mi)
- Elevation: 48 m (157 ft)

Population
  - Total: 7,308
  - Density: 2,560/km^{2} (6,620/sq mi)

The Nordviertel (German pronunciation: [ˈnɔʁtˌfɪʁtl̩], lit. 'Northern Quarter') is the most northern borough of the city district Stadtbezirk I (Stadtmitte/Frillendorf/Huttrop) in Essen.

== Geography and demographics ==
Nordviertel has 7,308 inhabitants and is therefore one of the smallest boroughs of Essen.It has an area of 2.86 km^{2} and its average elevation is 48 metres above sea level.
