= Oberhausen–Duisburg-Ruhrort railway =

Railway line in Germany

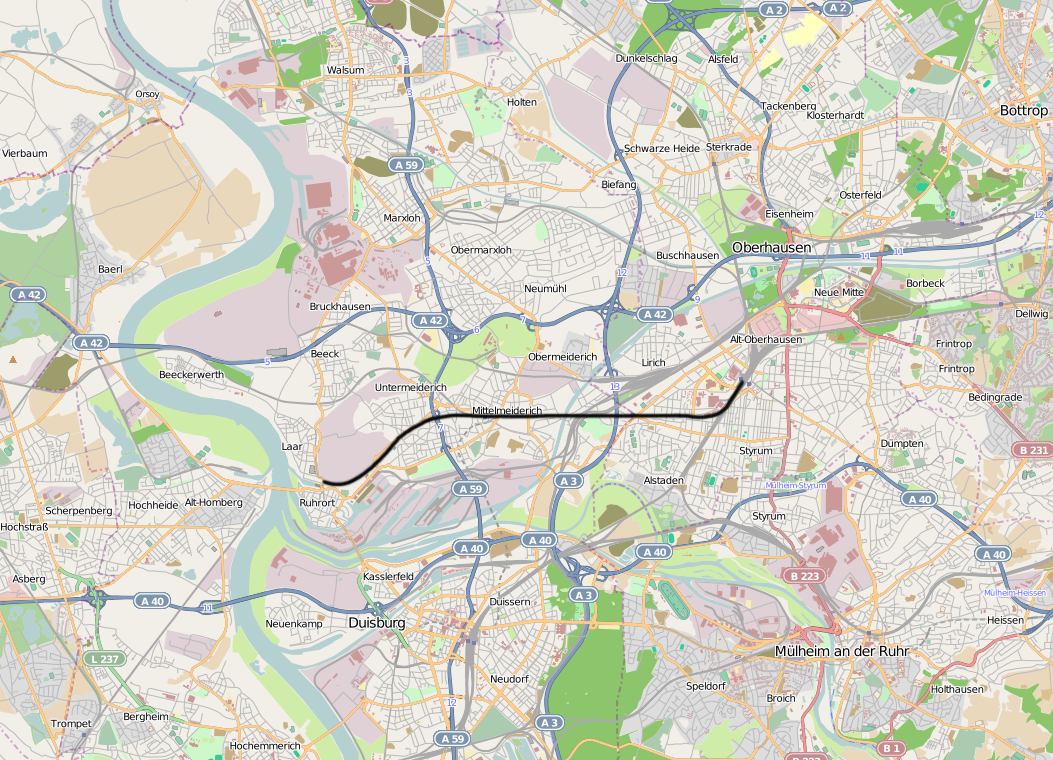

Overview
- Line number: 2274
- Locale: North Rhine-Westphalia, Germany

Service
- Route number: 447

Technical
- Line length: 9 km (5.6 mi)
- Track gauge: 1,435 mm (4 ft 8 1/2 in) standard gauge
- Operating speed: 100 km/h (62 mph) (maximum)

The Oberhausen–Duisburg-Ruhrort railway is a line in the German state of North Rhine-Westphalia. It runs from Oberhausen via Duisburg-Meiderich to Duisburg-Ruhrort.

The line is now classified as a main line, although it is not electrified and west of Duisburg-Meiderich Sud station it is entirely single-track.

== History ==
The Cologne-Minden Railway Company (Cöln-Mindener Eisenbahn-Gesellschaft, CME) opened the first railway in the Ruhr with the completion of its trunk line in 1847. This allowed coal mined in the Ruhr to be brought to consumers in the Lower Rhine. It entered into a contract with the Ruhrort-Crefeld District Gladbach Railway Company (Ruhrort–Crefeld−Kreis Gladbach Eisenbahngesellschaft, RCG) to build a line to Ruhrort and to establish a train ferry between Ruhrort and Homberg. The RCG agreed to build a line from Homberg to Mönchengladbach. The CME opened its branch line from Oberhausen Station via Meiderich to Ruhrort on 14 October 1848. Under the contract the train ferry was to become operational within four years of the completion of the line.

=== Development ===
After the Bergisch-Märkische Railway Company (Bergisch-Märkische Eisenbahn-Gesellschaft, BME) took over the RCG, together with the Aachen-Neuß-Düsseldorf Railway Company (Aachen-Neuß-Düsseldorfer Eisenbahngesellschaft) of the Royal Directorate of the Aachen-Düsseldorf-Ruhrort Railway Company (Königliche Direction der Aachen-Düsseldorf-Ruhrorter Eisenbahn) in 1866, it built a line to Ruhrort, starting from its Mülheim-Styrum station. This meant that BME lines connected to the ferry terminals on both shores, and so the CME line to Oberhausen abruptly lost its usefulness.

After the Duisburg-Hochfeld rail bridge was opened over the Rhine on the Osterath–Dortmund Süd line, the old Ruhrort–Homberg train ferry became completely run down and the line lost its national significance; instead, it was used for the transport of goods to the steel industry and the Port of Duisburg.

== Current situation ==
The railway lines built during the 19th century in areas that are now incorporated in the city of Duisburg do not reflect the current passenger traffic flows of the current population and this line has only limited usefulness for passenger transport.

In the past, freight mainly ran on the line between Duisburg-Ruhrorter Hafen (harbour) freight yard and the large Oberhausen West freight yard (formerly the Oberhausen RHE station). The Duisburg-Wedau–Bottrop Süd line of the former Rhenish Railway Company (Rheinische Eisenbahn-Gesellschaft, RHE) connected the two freight yards. Today the harbour yard is only connected to the east to the Duisburg-Wedau–Bottrop Süd line.

=== Rail services ===
The Ruhrort line is part of the network of the Verkehrsverbund Rhein-Ruhr (Rhine-Ruhr Public Transport Association). The Regionalbahn service RB 36 (Ruhrort-Bahn) was, until 2010, operated by the Prignitzer Eisenbahn (PEG), owned by Arriva. The travel time for the whole line was twelve minutes. There were connections to other trains at Oberhausen Hauptbahnhof. The PEG trains are operated with Bombardier Talent diesel multiple units (class 643.2) on one track, with an average speed of 45 km / h. The Ruhrort line ran on weekdays at 30-minute intervals and at weekends at 60-minute intervals. In December 2010, operations on the line were taken over by NordWestBahn and later by RheinRuhrBahn, both part of the Transdev Group.

Between February 2019 and 9 September 2019, trains were replaced by buses due to a shortage of available staff. With the timetable change on 15 December 2024, the line was again converted to bus operation. Currently, regular diesel multiple units are running again.
