= Borbeck-Mitte =

District of Essen, Germany

Coordinates: 51°28′30″N 6°57′04″E

Map of Essen, Borbeck-Mitte highlighted

Borbeck-Mitte is the central borough of Borbeck, the fourth suburban district of Essen, Germany. Together with the other boroughs of the district, it was incorporated on April 1, 1915. Borbeck-Mitte has a population of roughly 13,500 people and a total area of 3.19 km^{2} or 1.23 sq mi. The name Borbeck derives from Bor(a)thbeki, which means either river in a fertile lowland or river of the Bructeri.

== History ==
=== Early history synopsis ===
The first document mentioning Borbeck dates back to 869, when Borthbeki, a small rural commune, was mentioned as one of nine communes around Essen Abbey which were liable to tax. In 1288, princess-abbess Berta von Arnsberg bought probably mortgaged parts of the region and built the predecessor of Schloss Borbeck. By the 14th century, Schloss Borbeck had become the favorite residence of the princess-abbesses, which came along with a rise of prestige for the region. In 1339, princess-abbess Katharina von der Mark had Borbeck's old Romanesque church modified so the abbesses and their entourage could adequately attend mass.

=== 19th and 20th centuries ===
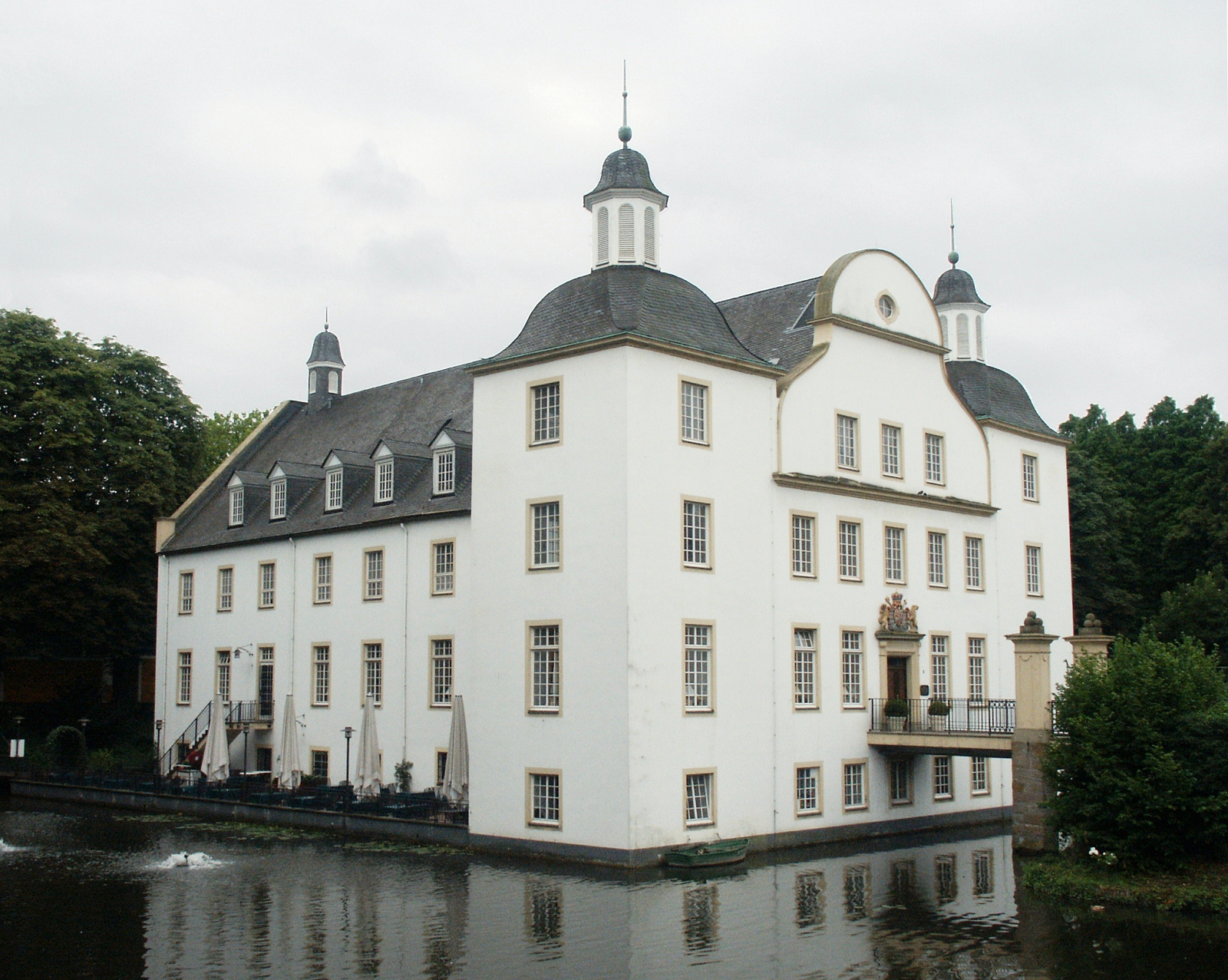
Borbeck Castle

After the dissolution of Essen Abbey in 1803, Borbeck was occupied by France and became a French municipality in 1808. In 1815, following the Congress of Vienna, Borbeck came to Prussia and was declared the center of a new independent Bürgermeisterei, which also included several townships around Borbeck. The Year Without a Summer, 1816, brought the last famine to Borbeck, and recovery took at least until 1819. Industrialization reached Borbeck in the 1840s, and the opening coal mines attracted many unemployed people. On February 1, 1862, two of the aforementioned townships, Lipperheide and Lirich, which accounted for two-thirds (1,827 ha (4,514.6 acres)) of the total area of Borbeck, were excorporated and became parts of the new city of Oberhausen. The same happened with the townships of Altendorf, Frohnhausen and Holsterhausen, which formed the new Bürgermeisterei of Altendorf in 1874. Although having lost most of its land area and a good deal of its population, Borbeck, with a population of over 70,000 people, remained the largest administrative district in Prussia without town privileges. Prior to the excorporations, the population was over 100,000, which nowadays means that Borbeck would have been a Großstadt, i.e. a major city. During the negotiations regarding the incorporation of Borbeck in 1915, Bürgermeister Rudolf Heinrich managed to use the size of Borbeck to attain several concessions from Essen, such as the construction of a public indoor swimming pool if the new Stadtbezirk was to break 100,000 inhabitants again.

== Institutions ==
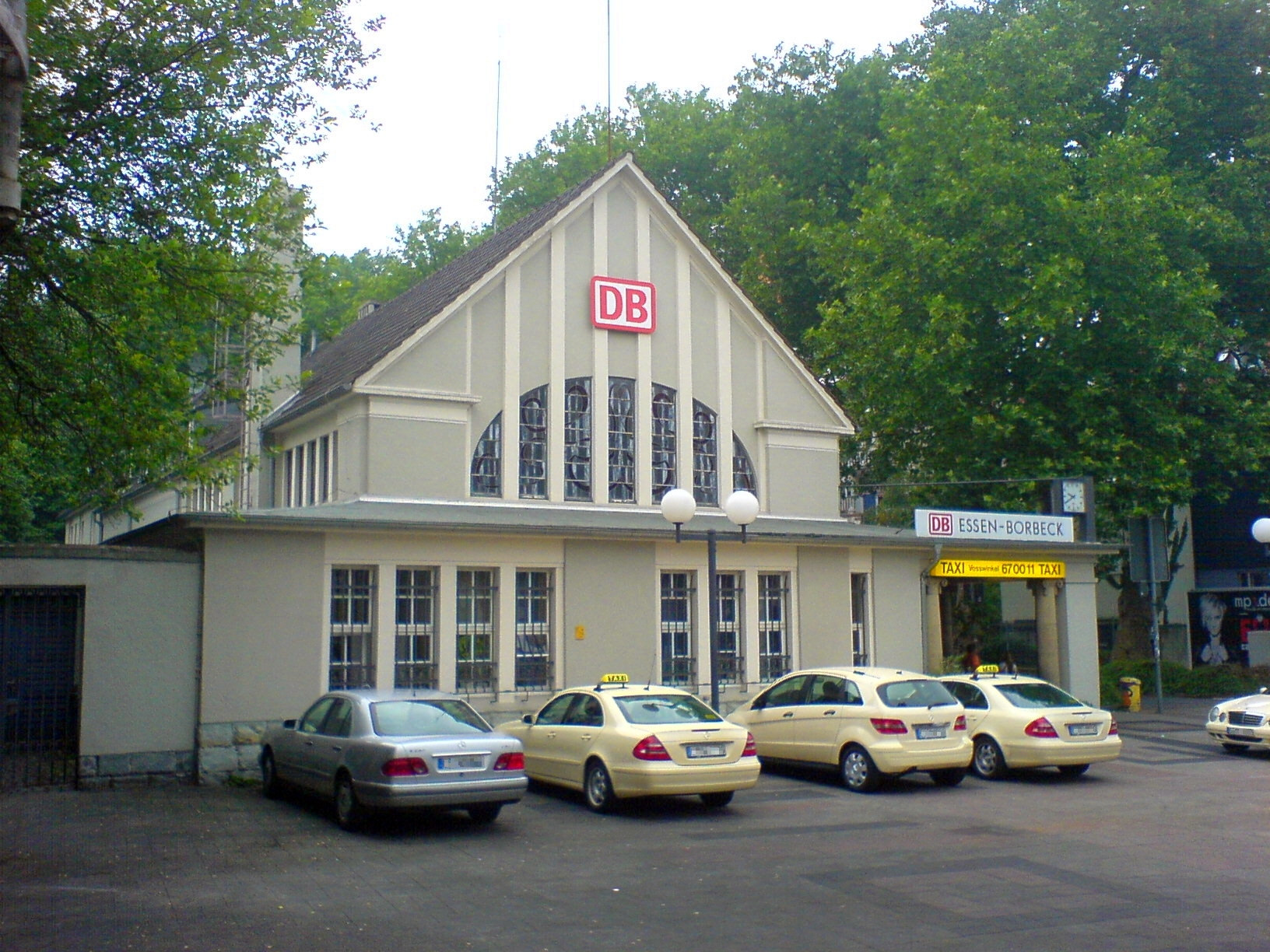
Train station at the new market place

The suburban district Stadtberzirk IV Borbeck, amongst Borbeck-Mitte (~ 13,500 inhabitants, 3.19 km^{2} or 1.23 sq mi), also comprises the following boroughs:

- Bedingrade (~ 12400 inhabitants, 2.93 km^{2} or 1.13 sq mi)
- Bergeborbeck (~ 4300 inhabitants, 4.96 km^{2} or 1.92 sq mi)
- Bochold (~ 18000 inhabitants, 3.19 km^{2} or 1.23 sq mi)
- Dellwig (~ 9300 inhabitants, 3.62 km^{2} or 1.40 sq mi)
- Frintrop (~ 8700 inhabitants, 1.96 km^{2} or 0.76 sq mi)
- Gerschede (~ 8000 inhabitants, 1.51 km^{2} or 0.58 sq mi)
- Schönebeck (~ 10200 inhabitants, 3.31 km^{2} or 1.28 sq mi)

Borbeck-Mitte, as the central borough of the district, offers several central institutions for the district, including a hospital, a local district court, a branch of the city's public library, as well as social welfare and employment offices and the aforementioned public swimming pool. The central pedestrian precinct features several mid-sized shops and a street market each Tuesday and Friday.

== Culture, public life and education ==
Borbeck-Mitte has a distinctive cultural life, mainly on personal initiative. Several church choirs exist, as well as six carnival and six sport-shooting associations and three amateur theater groups. The cultural historical society maintains a small museum and meeting place in the Alte Cuesterey near the central market place.

Borbeck Castle (German: Schloss Borbeck) is the central cultural institution of both borough and district. An institution of the cultural office of the city of Essen, it regularly hosts exhibitions and concerts. A permanent exhibition on the history of the abbey and the city has been established in 2006. Essen's public music school has been conducting classes here since 1999. The register office has set up a special room for marriages. The 55 ha (135.9 acres) park is open to the public and the largest park in the northwestern part of Essen. A street nowadays separates a smaller part in front of the castle from the rest of the park; this smaller part mostly consists of hilly lawns and includes a former boxing arena, which is now used for concerts.

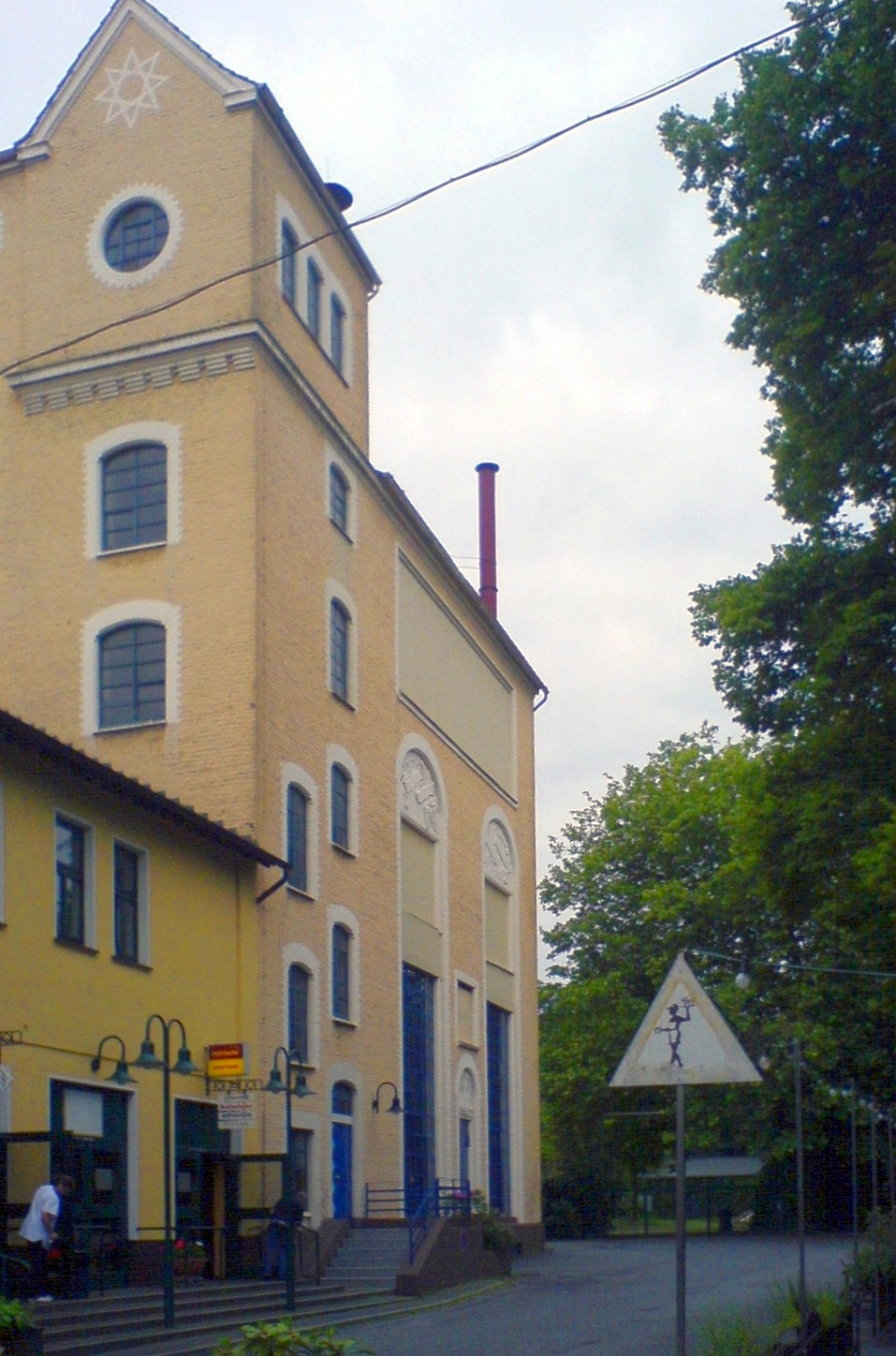
Steam beer brewery

A steam beer brewery near Borbeck's train station offers a variety of beers and Ruhr Area specialties. The brewery was founded in 1896 on the premises of the old brewery of the castle. It was later taken over by the local competitors Stern and, in the 1990s, Stauder. Brewing has continued, but has been shifted to Stauder's main facilities. The brewery has since become a restaurant and is popular with final years, class reunions and corporate events, mainly from the Borbeck area.

On one corner of the new market place, a fountain commemorates the habits of shortening old trousers for the summer months or buying clothes, especially trousers, a few sizes larger for children to grow into. Throughout the Ruhr Area, this habit has become known as Borbecker Halblang (Borbeck's half long).

Since 1949, a weekly local newspaper called Borbecker Nachrichten reports on cultural events, sports and general news from the district. The gazette, which at times had been the largest local newspaper in Germany, remained independent until 2000, when it was acquired by Essen-based WAZ-Mediengruppe.

Well-known educational institutions in Borbeck are the Gymnasium Borbeck and the Mädchengymnasium Borbeck, the latter being the single public Gymnasium for girls only in North Rhine-Westphalia; sixth form classes are sometimes offered in co-operation of both schools. Two Realschulen, two Gesamtschulen, several primary schools (the latter mainly run by the church) and a special school for children with speech disorders can also be found in Borbeck-Mitte.

== Notable personalities ==
- Heinrich Uhlendahl (1868–1954), librarian and founder of the German national bibliography
- Otto Doppelfeld (1907–1979), archaeologist
- Heinz-Horst Deichmann (1926-), entrepreneur
- Albert Vögler (1877–1945), entrepreneur

== Literature ==
- The periodicals of the Cultural Historical Society of Borbeck, called Borbecker Beiträge, since 1987
- Walter Wimmer: Gewachsen in 11 Jahrhunderten - Borbecker Chronik, Verlag Borbecker Nachrichten, Essen (1980 - 1993)
- Lutz Niethammer: Die Unfähigkeit zur Stadtentwicklung. Erklärung der seelischen Störung eines Communalbaumeisters in Preußens größtem Industriedorf, in: Engelhart, U. u.a. (eds.): Soziale Bewegung und politische Verfassung. Beiträge zur Geschichte der modernen Welt, Stuttgart 1976.
- Ludwig W. Wördehoff: Borbeck in seinen Straßennamen, Rainer-Henselowsky-Verlag, Essen 1987

== Attribution ==
- Most sections of this article are translations from the German Wikipedia. The version used can be found under this link. The original authors of the German-language version can be found here
