= Hamminkeln station =

Railway station in Hamminkeln, Germany

Hamminkeln
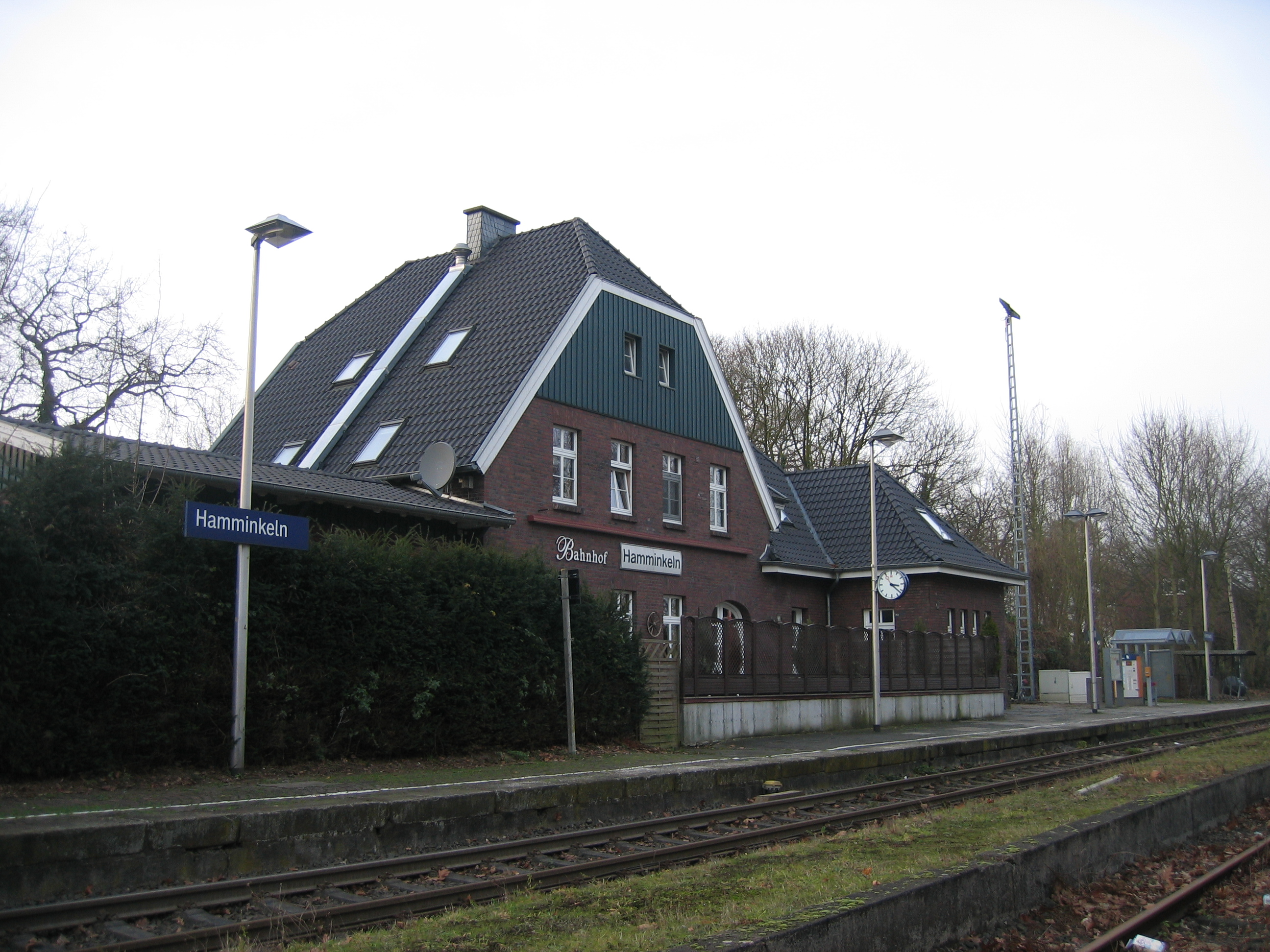
- Hamminkeln railway station

General information
- Location: Hamminkeln, Wesel, North Rhine-Westphalia, Germany
- Coordinates: 51°44′06″N 6°36′06″E
- Line: Bocholt-Wesel railway
- Platforms: 1
- Tracks: 1

Construction
- Accessible: Yes

Other information
- Fare zone: VRR: 881
- Website: www.bahnhof.de

Services
Preceding station	VIAS	Following station
Dingden towards Bocholt	RE 19	Blumenkamp towards Düsseldorf Hbf
Location
- Location within North Rhine-Westphalia Location within Germany Location within Europe

Hamminkeln is a railway station in Hamminkeln, North Rhine-Westphalia, Germany.

== The Station ==
The station is located on the Bocholt-Wesel railway and is served by the Rhein-IJssel-Express (RE 19) service operated by VIAS.

== Train services ==
The following services currently call at Hamminkeln:

Series	Operator	Route	Material	Frequency
RE 19 Rhein-IJssel-Express	VIAS	Bocholt – Hamminkeln – Wesel – Oberhausen – Duisburg – Düsseldorf	Stadler Flirt 3	Hourly
