= Blumenkamp station =

Railway station in Germany

Wesel Blumenkamp
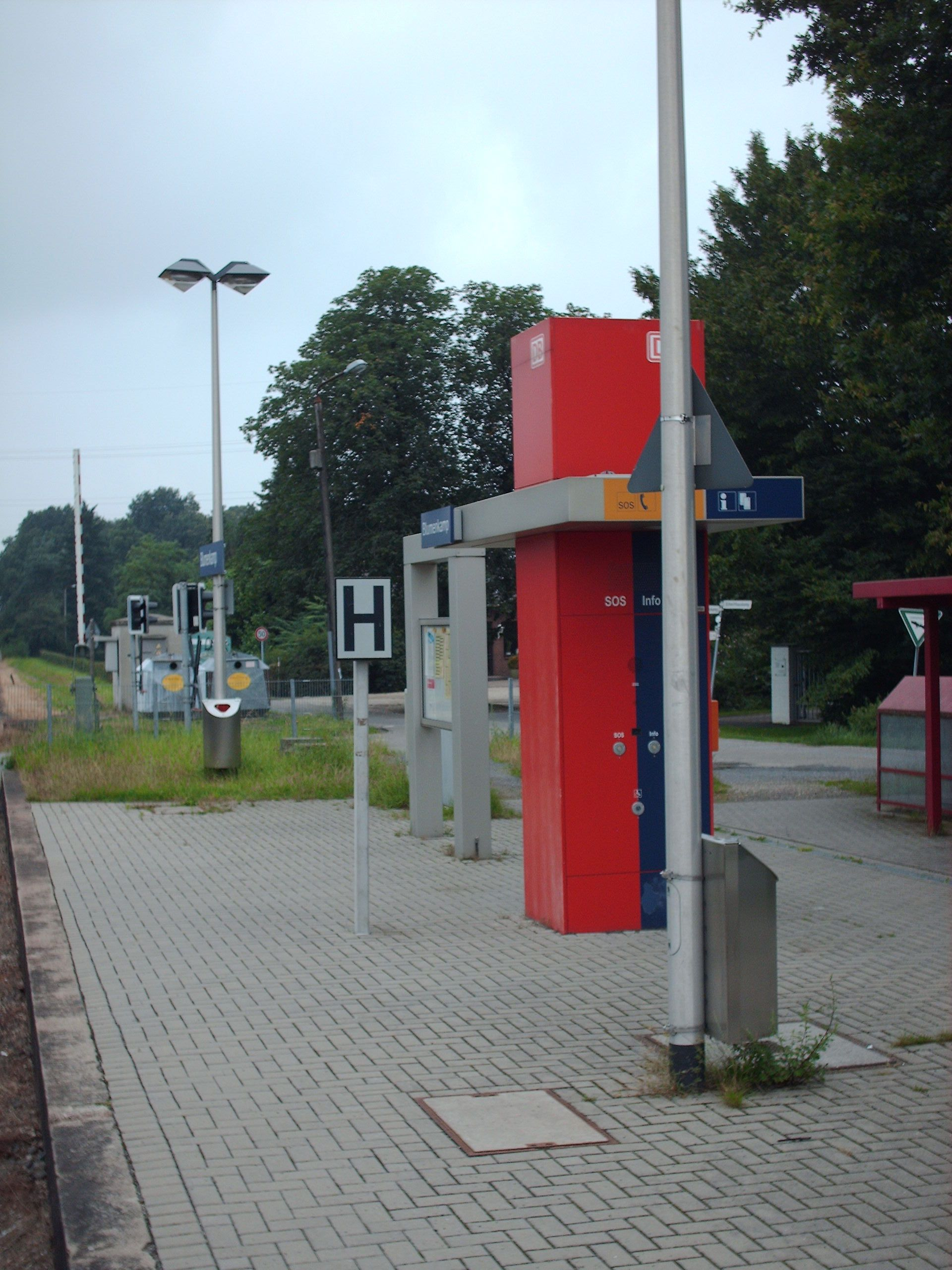
- Blumenkamp station, Wesel, Germany

General information
- Location: Blumenkamp, Wesel, NRW
- Coordinates: 51°41′39″N 6°36′48″E
- Line: Bocholt-Wesel railway
- Platforms: 1
- Tracks: 1

Construction
- Accessible: Yes

Other information
- Fare zone: VRR: 031
- Website: www.bahnhof.de

Services
Preceding station	VIAS	Following station
Hamminkeln towards Bocholt	RE 19	Wesel towards Düsseldorf Hbf
Location

Blumenkamp is a railway station in Blumenkamp, North Rhine-Westphalia, Germany.

== The Station ==
The station is located on the Bocholt-Wesel railway and is served by the Rhein-IJssel-Express (RE 19) service operated by VIAS.

== Train services ==
The following services currently call at Blumenkamp:

Series	Operator	Route	Material	Frequency
RE 19 Rhein-IJssel-Express	VIAS	Bocholt – Blumenkamp – Wesel – Oberhausen – Duisburg – Düsseldorf	Stadler Flirt 3	Hourly
