= Dingden station =

Railway station in Germany

Dingden
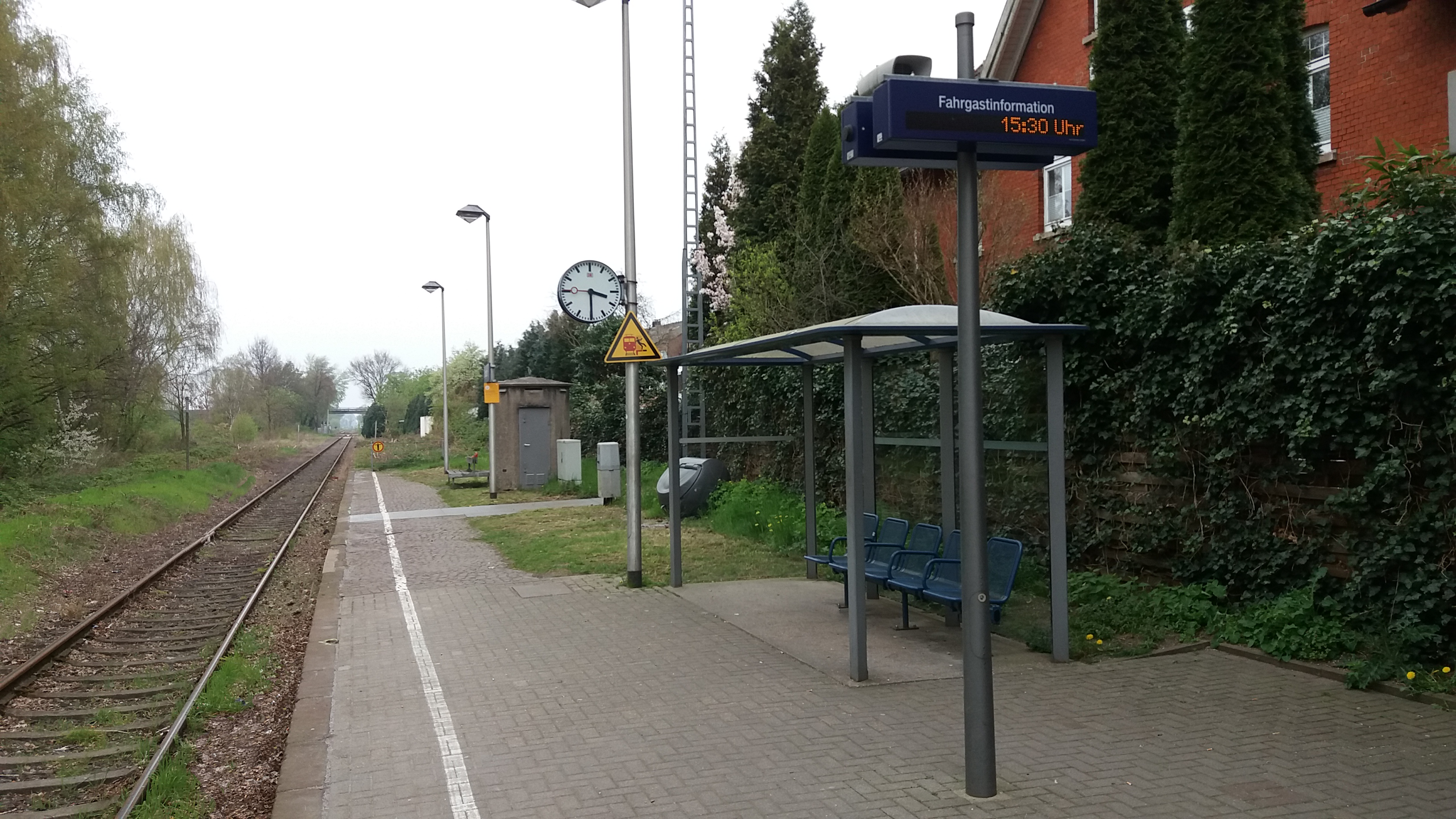

General information
- Location: Dingden, Wesel, NRW, Germany
- Coordinates: 51°46′14″N 6°36′29″E
- Line: Bocholt-Wesel railway
- Platforms: 1
- Tracks: 1

Construction
- Accessible: Yes

Other information
- Fare zone: VRR: 882
- Website: www.bahnhof.de

Services
Preceding station	VIAS	Following station
Bocholt Terminus	RE 19	Hamminkeln towards Düsseldorf Hbf
Location

Dingden is a station in Dingden, North Rhine-Westphalia, Germany. It is part of Hamminkeln.

== The Station ==
The station is on the Bocholt-Wesel railway and is served by a service operated by VIAS.

== Train services ==
The following services currently call at Dingden:

Series	Route	Frequency
RE 19 Rhein-IJssel-Express	Bocholt – Dingden – Wesel – Oberhausen – Duisburg – Düsseldorf	Hourly
