= Praest station =

Railway station in Germany

Praest

General information
- Location: Praest, Emmerich am Rhein, NRW; Germany
- Coordinates: 51°49′20″N 6°20′33″E
- Line: Arnhem-Oberhausen railway
- Platforms: 2
- Tracks: 2

Construction
- Accessible: Yes

Other information
- Fare zone: VRR: 712
- Website: www.bahnhof.de

Services
Preceding station	VIAS	Following station
Emmerich towards Arnhem Centraal	RE 19	Millingen (bei Rees) towards Düsseldorf Hbf
Location
- Location within North Rhine-Westphalia

Praest (German: Bahnhof Praest) is a railway station in Praest, Emmerich am Rhein, North Rhine-Westphalia, Germany. It lies on the Arnhem-Oberhausen railway. The train services are operated by VIAS.

== Train services ==
The station is served by the following trains:

- Regional services RE 19 Arnhem - Emmerich - Wesel - Oberhausen - Duisburg - Düsseldorf
