= Millingen railway station =

- Millingen (bei Rees) railway station on the Arnhem-Oberhausen railway
- Millingen (bei Rheinberg) railway station on the Xanten - Duisburg railway
