= Millingen (bei Rees) station =

Railway station in Germany

Millingen (Kr Rees)

General information
- Location: Millingen (Rees), NRW; Germany
- Coordinates: 51°48′33″N 6°24′02″E
- Line: Arnhem-Oberhausen railway
- Platforms: 2
- Tracks: 2

Other information
- Fare zone: VRR: 793

Services
Preceding station	VIAS	Following station
Praest towards Arnhem Centraal	RE 19	Empel-Rees towards Düsseldorf Hbf
Location
- Location within North Rhine-Westphalia

Millingen (Kreis Rees) (German: Bahnhof Millingen) is a railway station in Millingen (Rees), North Rhine-Westphalia, Germany. It lies on the Arnhem-Oberhausen railway. The train services are operated by VIAS.

== Train services ==
The station is served by the following trains:

- Regional services RE 19 Arnhem - Emmerich - Wesel - Oberhausen - Duisburg - Düsseldorf

== Bus services ==
- 61 (Rees - Empel-Rees - Millingen - Bocholt)
- 63 (Millingen - Empel-Rees - Haldern - Wesel)
- 87 (Rees - Empel-Rees - Millingen)
