= Emmerich station =

Railway station in Germany

Emmerich
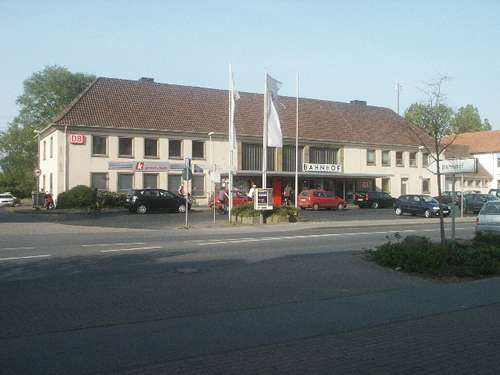
- Emmerich station

General information
- Location: Emmerich am Rhein, NRW, Germany
- Coordinates: 51°50′02″N 6°15′25″E
- Line: Arnhem-Oberhausen railway
- Platforms: 4
- Tracks: 10

Other information
- Fare zone: VRR: 711
- Website: www.bahnhof.de

Services
Preceding station	VIAS	Following station
Emmerich-Elten towards Arnhem Centraal	RE 19	Praest towards Düsseldorf Hbf
Location
- Location within North Rhine-Westphalia

Emmerich (German: Bahnhof Emmerich) is a railway station in Emmerich am Rhein, North Rhine-Westphalia, Germany.

== The station ==
Emmerich station is a German railway station close to the Dutch border on the Arnhem-Oberhausen railway in the town of Emmerich. It is served hourly by trains operating the Rhein-IJssel-Express between Arnhem and Düsseldorf.

The station is largely used by freight and features both the Dutch and German voltages on most tracks. In the past all trains had to change from a Dutch to a German locomotive and vice versa at Emmerich, but now there are more dual voltage locomotives that can operate in many countries, so through-running often happens now without stopping.

The Intercity-Express (ICE) from Amsterdam to Cologne, Frankfurt/Main and Basel all pass through the station without stopping.

With the introduction of ICE 3 trains in 2000 the service between the Netherlands and Emmerich stopped, From the timetable change in December 2005, Dutch train operator Syntus started a weekend service between Arnhem and Emmerich. However, the service was unsuccessful and terminated after 6 months.

In early 2014 platforms, 1 and 2 were modernised, including new paving and the construction of a waiting shelter.

In December 2016 Abellio Deutschland began operating the RB35 between Düsseldorf, Duisburg, Emmerich and Arnhem.

== Train services ==
The station is served by the following service(s):

- Regional services RE 19 Arnhem - Emmerich - Wesel - Oberhausen - Duisburg - Düsseldorf

== Bus services ==
A number of bus services are operated by NIAG and LOOK to the surrounding area. These are:

- SB58 (Emmerich - Kleve - Kranenburg - Nijmegen (NL))
- 88 (Emmerich - Vrasselt - Praest - Rees)
- 91 (Emmerich - 's-Heerenberg (NL))
- 92 (Emmerich - Speelberg)
- 93 (Emmerich - Vrasselt - Praest)
- 94 (Emmerich - Borghees - Elten)

== Gallery ==
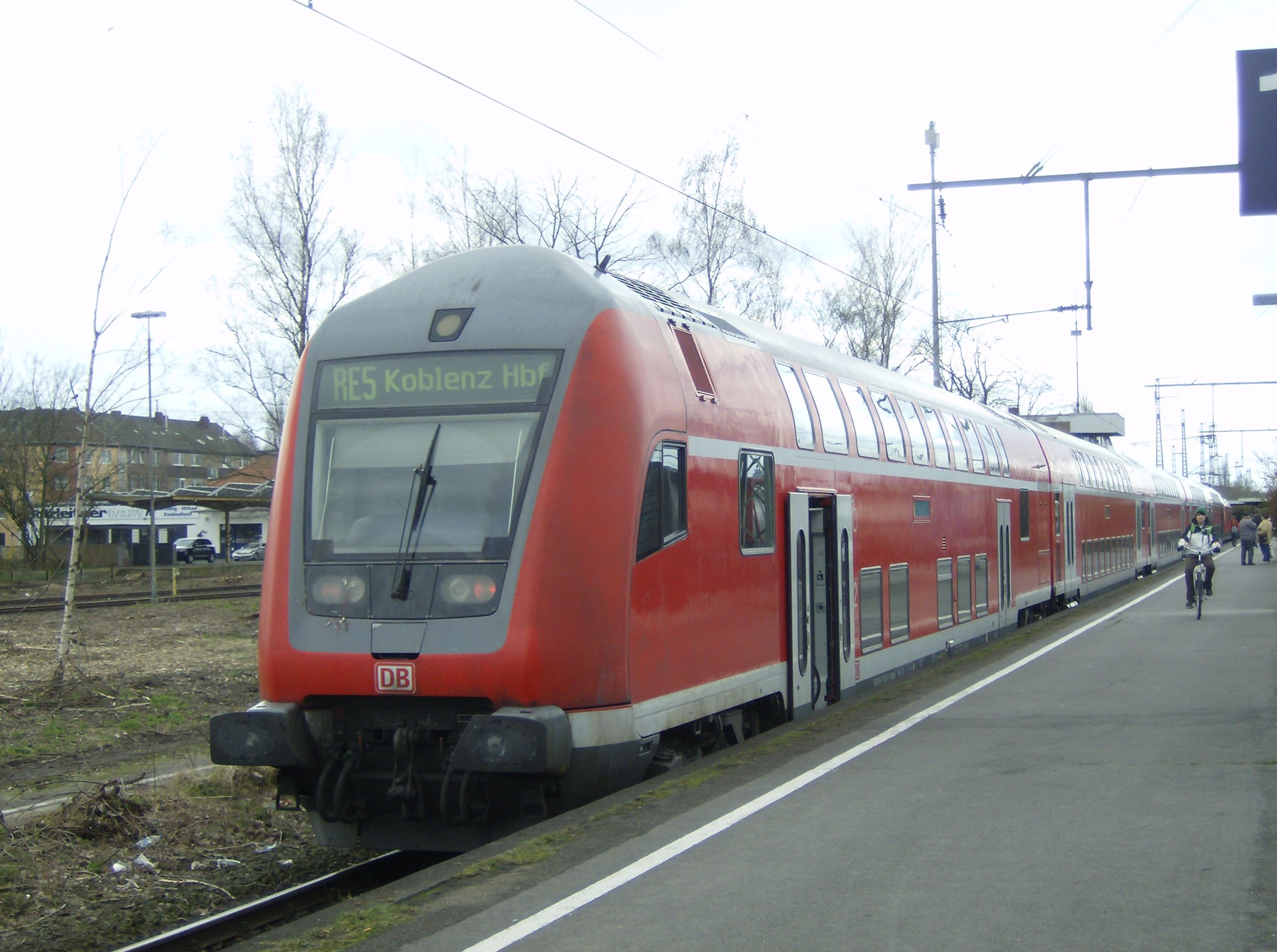
RE5 service at Emmerich calls at platform 1

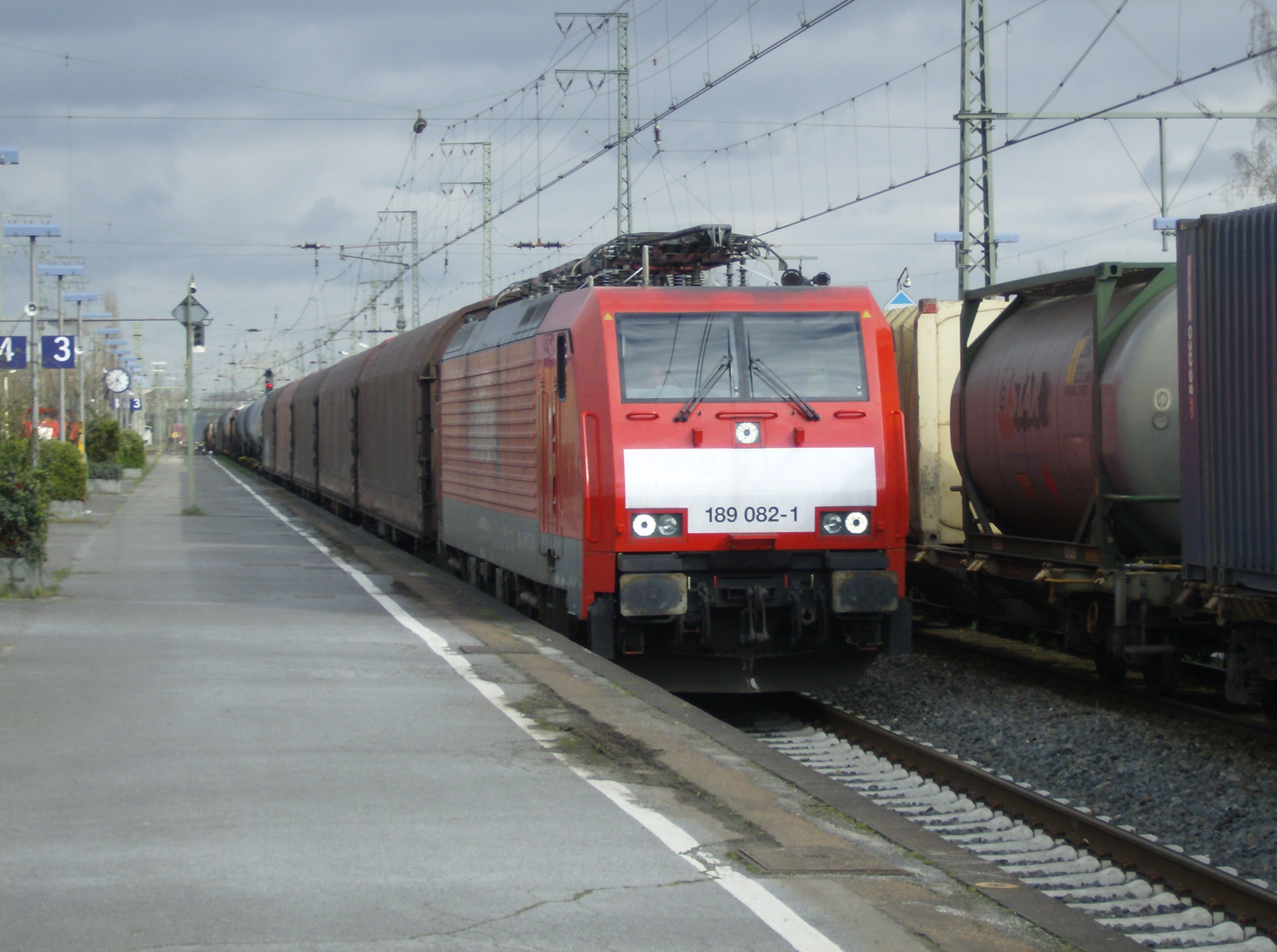
A freight train passing through Emmerich

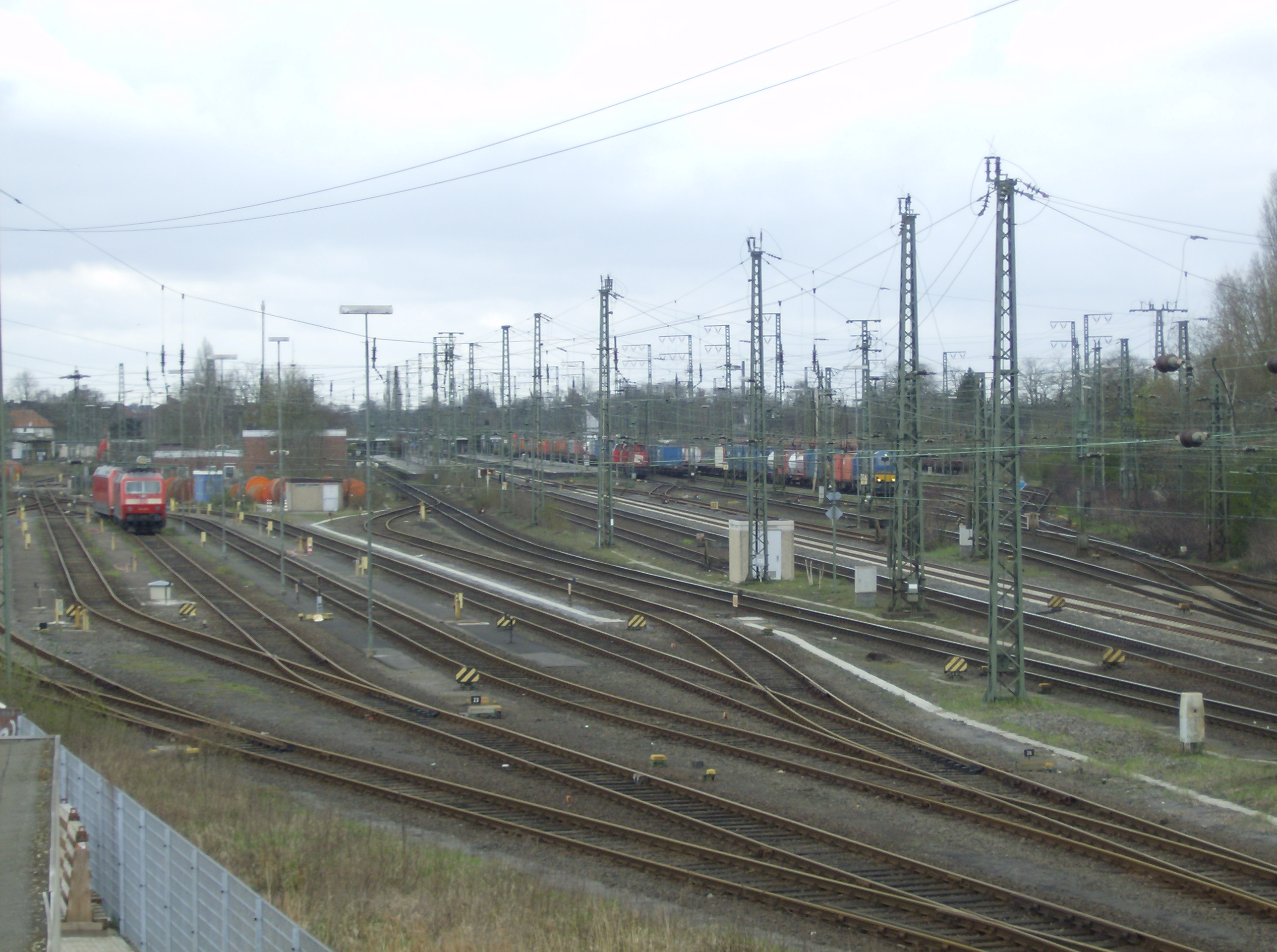
A view of the yard and station from the east
