= Bocholt station =

Railway station in Bocholt, Germany

Bocholt
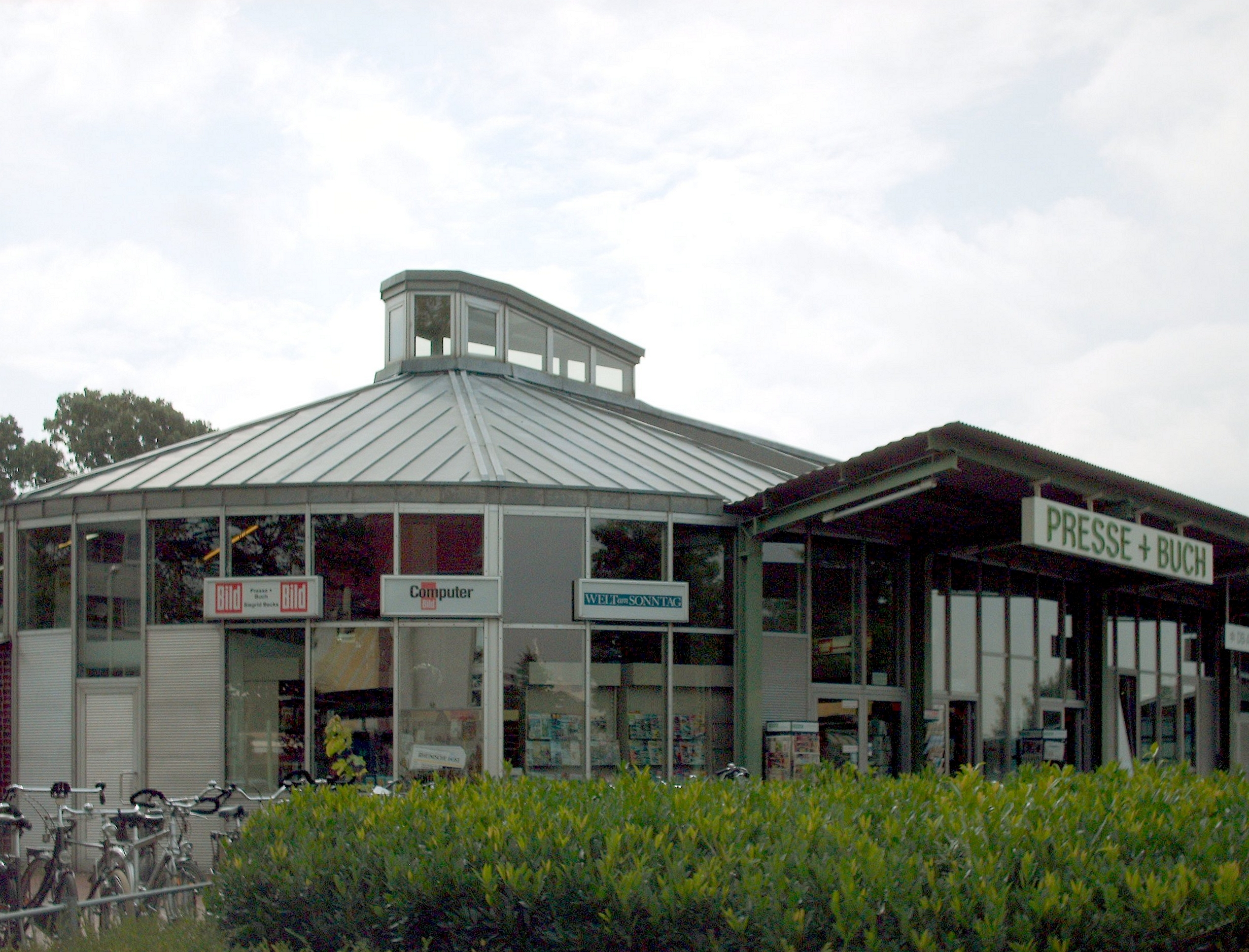
- Bocholt station

General information
- Location: Bocholt, Wesel, NRW, Germany
- Coordinates: 51°50′05″N 6°37′14″E
- Owner: Deutsche Bahn
- Operator: DB Netz; DB Station&Service
- Line: Bocholt-Wesel railway
- Platforms: 1
- Tracks: 1

Construction
- Accessible: Yes

Other information
- Station code: 723
- DS100 code: EBCH
- IBNR: 8000040
- Category: 6
- Fare zone: Westfalentarif: 57671
- Website: www.bahnhof.de

History
- Opened: 1 July 1878

Services
Preceding station	VIAS	Following station
Terminus	RE 19	Dingden towards Düsseldorf Hbf
Location

Bocholt is a station in Bocholt, North Rhine-Westphalia, Germany. It is now the terminus of the Rhein-IJssel-Express service. In the past trains ran in four directions, including to Winterswijk in the Netherlands.

== History ==
The station was opened on 1 July 1878 by the Cologne-Minden Railway Company (Cöln-Mindener Eisenbahn-Gesellschaft, CME) together with the Bocholt–Wesel railway, which branched off its Oberhausen–Arnhem railway (known as the Hollandstrecke–"Holland line") at Wesel.

Just over two years later, on 25 August 1880, the Niederländisch-Westfälische Eisenbahn-Gesellschaft (Dutch-Westphalian Railway Company) opened the Winterswijk–Bocholt railway and the station became a through station.

At the beginning of the 20th century, the Prussian state railways started building the Empel-Rees–Münster railway (Baumbergebahn). With the opening of the first section on 1 August 1901, Bocholt became a junction station and with the opening of the second section to Borken exactly one year later it was connected in four directions.

Through traffic to Winterswijk ended after the First World War. Passenger traffic on the remaining part of this line to Barlo came to an end around 1952 and freight traffic was discontinued in 1989.

Passenger traffic on the Empel-Rees–Münster railway ended in 1974 and freight traffic towards Empel-Rees ended in 1984. A section of the line is still preserved as a siding from the town of Bocholt to Mussum. Freight traffic towards the east (Rhedebrügge) ended in 1991. Since then Bocholt has been a terminus again.

In the mid-1990s, the town of Bocholt bought a Class 628 railcar and donated it to Deutsche Bahn, which at that time was operating passenger services on the line to Wesel, in order to ensure continued services on the line.

== Railway facilities ==
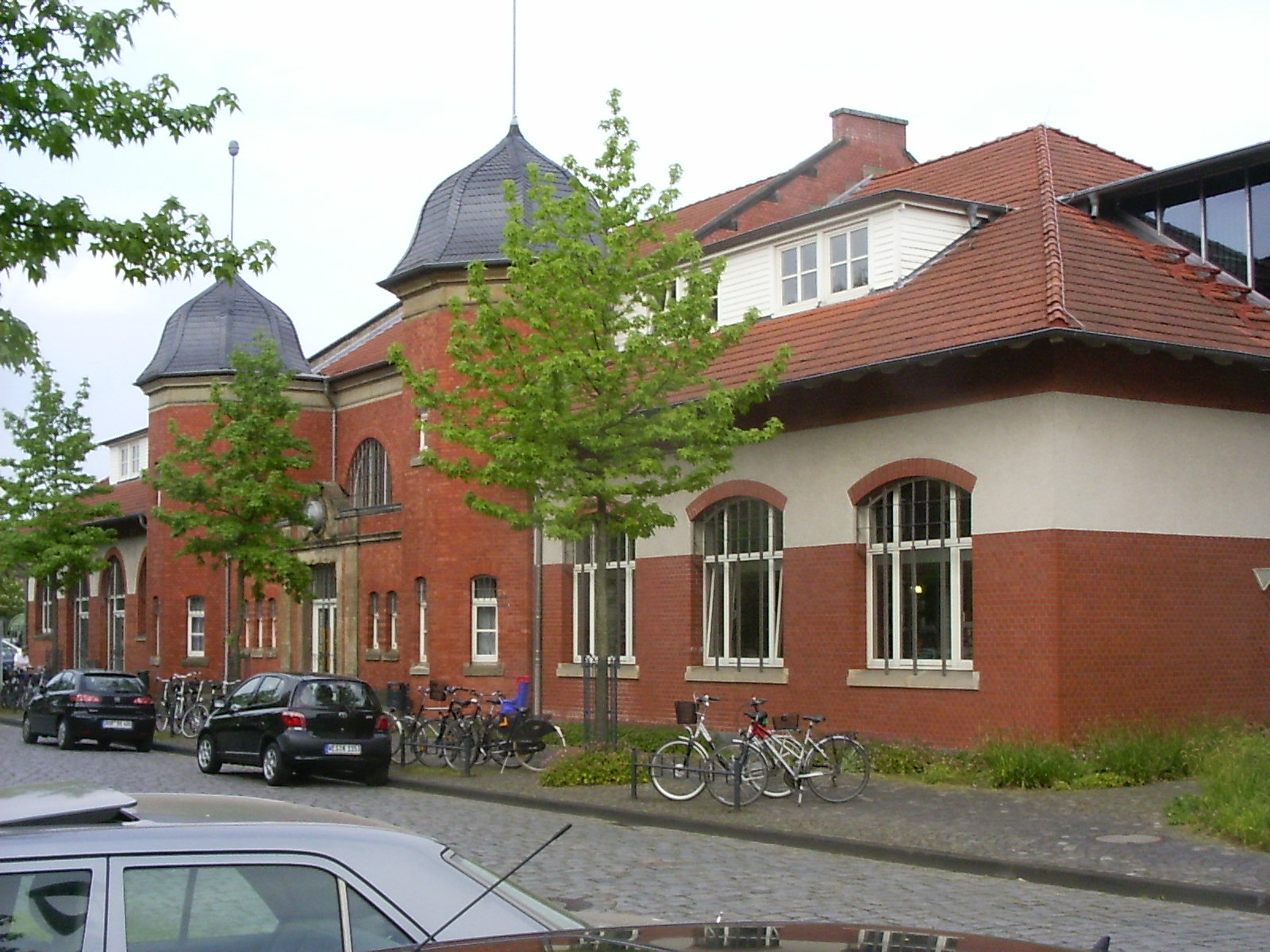
Former station building

The preserved entrance building was built in 1904. It now houses the town library and the town gallery. South of the former entrance building was a goods yard, where trains were loaded with goods on a loading track and ran towards the Ruhr area.

In the mid-1990s, the passenger station was completely rebuilt. One island platform was torn down and the other was converted into an interchange platform with buses on the other side. At the same time, a new, smaller entrance building was erected, which faces directly onto the remaining platform. In the past there was a locomotive shed with a turntable at the station, where steam locomotives were located.

== Rail services ==
The station is located on the Bocholt-Wesel railway and is served by the Rhein-IJssel-Express (RE 19), which is operated by VIAS. Although this stops at all stations to Wesel, it is classified as a Regional-Express, because it is operated as a portion of the Rhein-IJssel-Express to Düsseldorf.

Line	Line name	Route	Frequency
RE 19	Rhein-IJssel-Express	Bocholt – Wesel – Oberhausen – Duisburg – Düsseldorf	60 mins
