= Bocholt–Wesel railway =

Railway line in Germany

Bocholt–Wesel
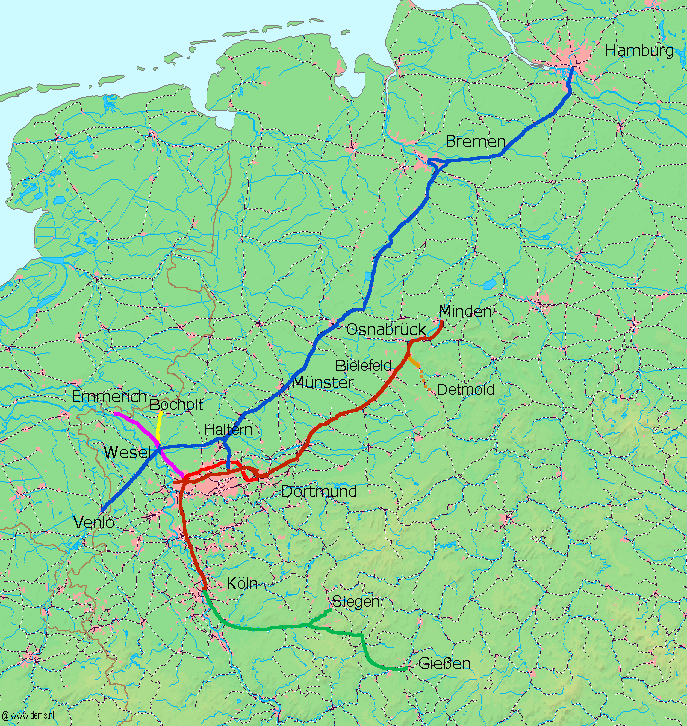
- Bocholt–Wesel railway line in yellow

Overview
- Line number: 2263
- Locale: North Rhine-Westphalia, Germany

Service
- Route number: 421

History
- Electrification: 1 February 2022

Technical
- Line length: 20.4 km (12.7 mi)
- Track gauge: 1,435 mm (4 ft 8 1/2 in) standard gauge
- Electrification: 15 kV 16.7 Hz AC
- Operating speed: 100 km/h (62 mph) (maximum)

The Bocholt–Wesel railway is a single-track branch line in the German state of North Rhine-Westphalia from Wesel in the Lower Rhine region to Bocholt in western Münsterland.

== History ==
In the middle of the 19th century, the town of Bocholt (including the cotton industry) developed plans to connect to the new railway network. In 1856, the Holland Line was opened by the Cologne-Minden Railway Company (Cöln-Mindener Eisenbahn-Gesellschaft, CME), but ran from Wesel along the Rhine via Emmerich to Arnhem, missing Bocholt. Several initiatives launched by businessmen from Cologne and Münster were not able raise the necessary capital to build a line to Bocholt.

On 26 May 1875, the CME finally received a concession for the construction of a branch line from Wesel to Bocholt, which was opened for passenger traffic on 1 July 1878.

Two years later on 25 August 1880, the Dutch Westphalian Railway Company (Niederländisch-Westfälische Eisenbahn-Gesellschaft) opened the Winterswijk–Bocholt railway, turning the terminal station into a through station. In 1901, after the nationalisation of most of Prussia’s private railway companies, the opening of the Empel-Rees–Münster railway by the Prussian state railways from Empel-Rees to Bocholt on 1 August 1901 and its continuation to Borken on 1 August 1902 made Bocholt into a junction station.

Since the end of the 20th century, with the closure of the two newest lines, Bocholt station has become a terminus again.

== Operations ==
The line is served by Regional-Express service RE 19a (Der Bocholter). In Wesel it connects with Regional-Express services RE 5 (Rhein-Express, towards Oberhausen, Düsseldorf and on to Koblenz), RE 19 (Rhein-IJssel-Express, towards Oberhausen and Düsseldorf) and RE 49 (Wupper-Lippe-Express, towards Oberhausen, Essen and Wuppertal.

RB 32 is operated by Abellio Rail NRW hourly on weekdays and every two hours on Saturday afternoons and on Sundays. It is operated with Alstom Coradia LINT diesel multiple units, which can only run at 80 km/h on this track, despite their maximum speed of 120 km/h.

The siding of the precast concrete plant of Max Bögl in Hamminkeln is served as necessary to supply materials for construction projects, mostly tunnels, by trains operated by Bocholter Eisenbahngesellschaft mbH on behalf of DB Schenker. A signalman is stationed at the precast concrete plant for this traffic.

The route is now part of DB's Münster-Ostwestfalen (Münster-East Westphalia) regional network (MOW), which has its headquarters in Münster.

In the local press of 16 May and 20 May 2011 it was revealed that the Verkehrsverbund Rhein-Ruhr (Rhine-Ruhr Transport Association, VRR) was undertaking a feasibility study that would examine the electrification of the Bocholt railway. After the upgrade, if necessary, the operations of Regionalbahn service RB 32 would be abandoned and Regionalbahn service RB 33 (Rhein-Niers-Bahn) would be extended to Bocholt. This would provide a through-service from Bocholt to the Ruhr region. The feasibility study was completed in January 2012. In a press release of 22 March 2013 announcing the award of the operations of the Lower Rhine network to Abellio Rail GmbH from 2016, the VRR announced that the feasibility study on the electrification of the railway to Bocholt was much more positive than expected. The electrification with a design speed of 80 km/h would cost 'only' €12 million; with a design speed of 100 km/h it would cost €15 million, which is far below the initial estimates of €20 million. Electrification of the Bocholt Railway would allow it to be integrated into the Lower Rhine network. The VRR undertook further planning with the aim of completing the electrification in December 2016. The electrification has been delayed until the end of 2022.

The line has been served by Alstom Coradia LINT diesel railcars since the takeover of operation by Abellio Rail NRW in December 2016 and this will continue until 2022. It is planned to use Stadler Flirt railcars after the completion of the electrification. From then on, there will be direct connections from Bocholt to Düsseldorf. This is to be achieved by integration into the Linie RE 19 line, with sets planned to be coupled or uncoupled in Wesel.

In June 2018, it was announced that the implementation of the infrastructure measures was threatened by a further delay, as the municipality of Hamminkeln was not prepared to pay its share to improve the safety of three private level crossings. This is necessary to be able to increase the speed from 80 km/h to 100 km/h. Hamminkeln was seeking to have the financing clarified legally, while the VRR stated that the new timetable concept could not then be implemented at the timetable change in December 2019. In March 2019, it became known that the implementation of the electrification of the line was delayed indefinitely and could not be implemented at the timetable change in December 2019. This was due to delays in the planning approval procedure and coordination problems with the overhead line masts that are being used in conjunction with the upgrade of the Oberhausen–Emmerich line.

Since Abellio Rail NRW took over operations in December 2016, the route has been operated with Alstom Coradia LINT DMUs. This was expected to continue until 2019 when electrification of the line was scheduled to be completed and the operation of Stadler Flirt EMUs was planned. Electrification has since been deferred. These will run directly from Bocholt to Düsseldorf. This will be realised by the inclusion of the line into the route of the Rhein-IJssel-Express (RE 19), which will involve portion working, with sets being split or joined in Wesel. Electrification of the line was completed on 1 February 2022. The project also raised the maximum line speed to 100 kilometres per hour (62 mph) between Wesel and Hamminkeln.

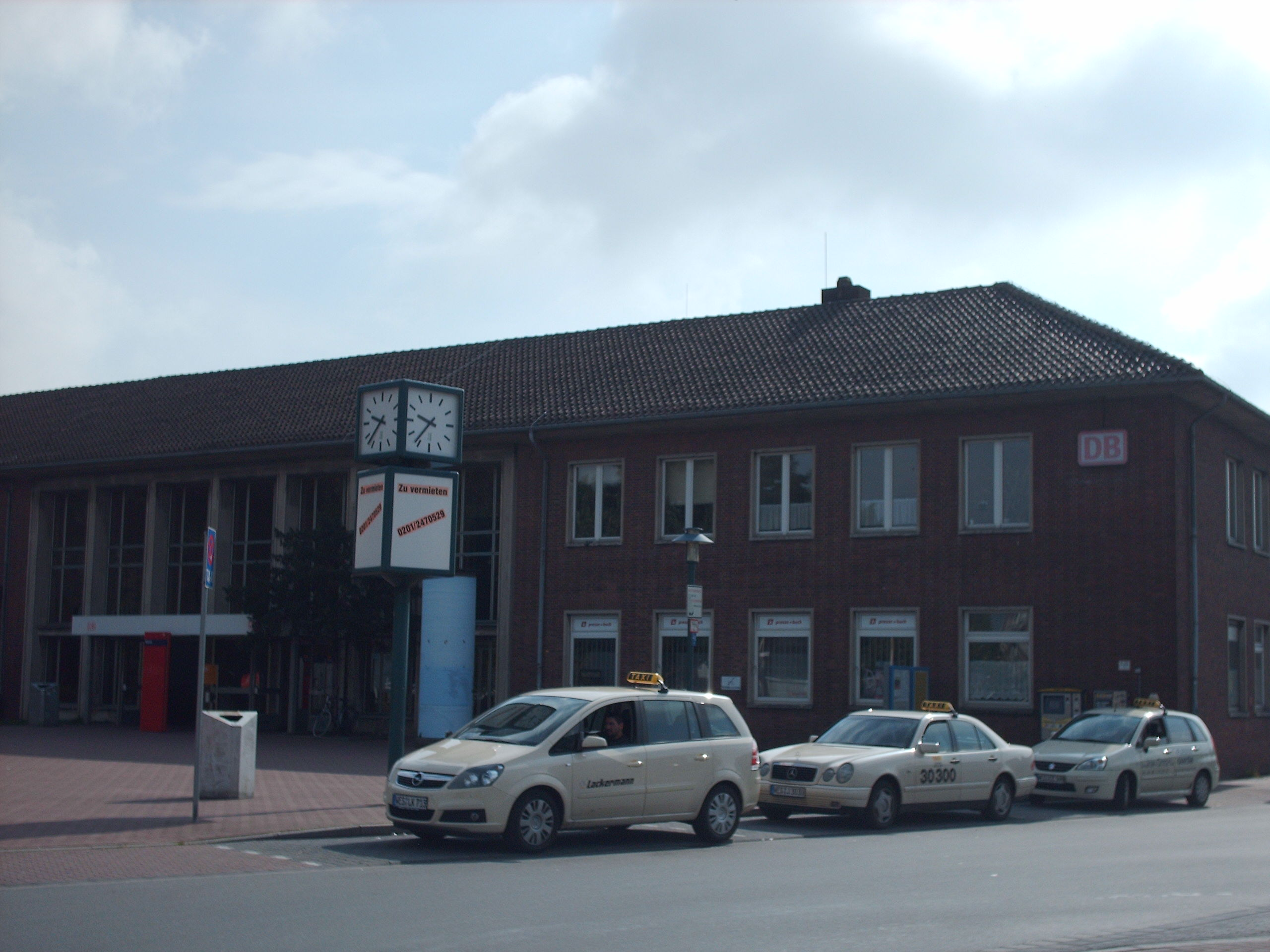
Wesel station

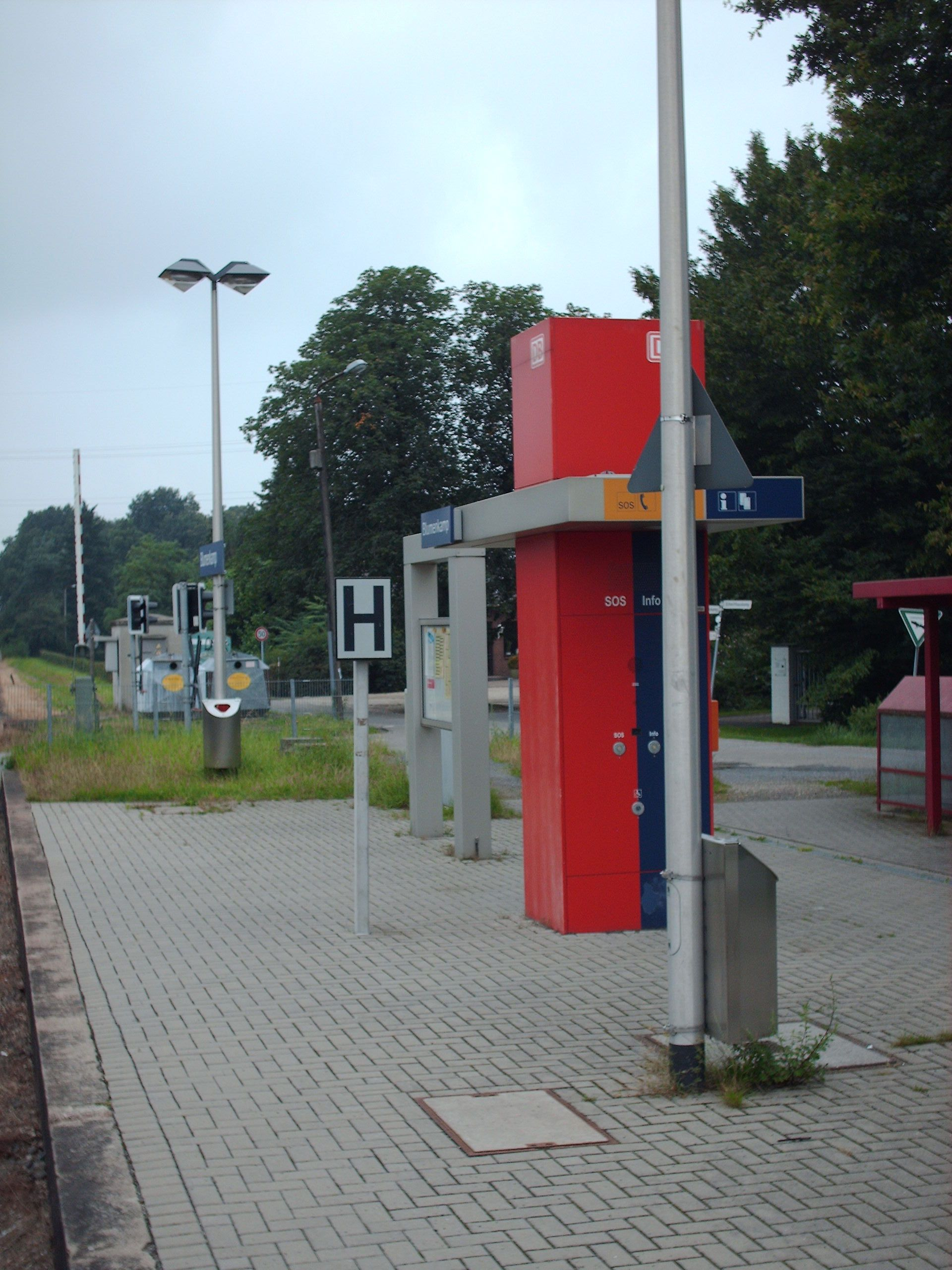
Blumenkamp station

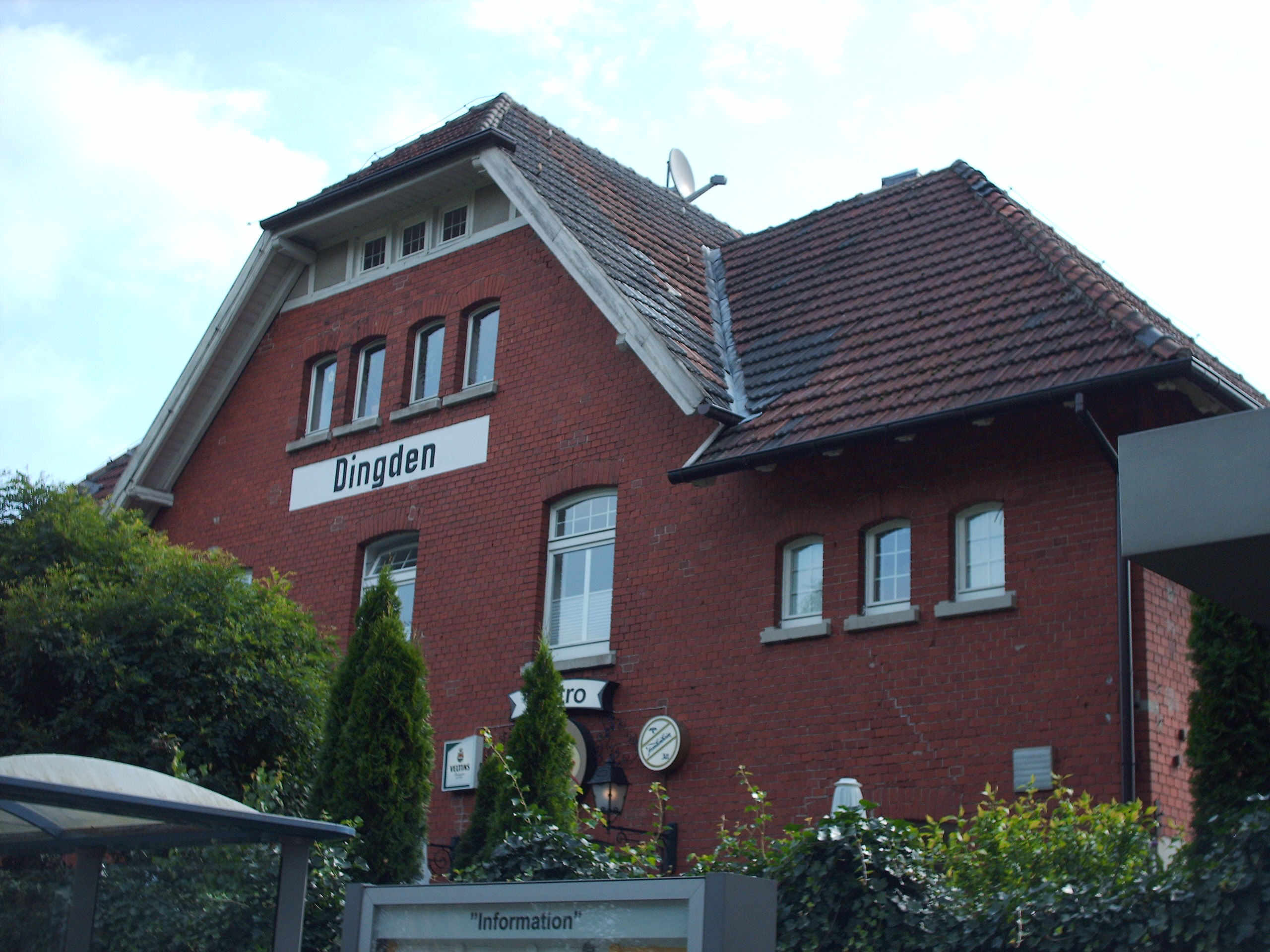
Dingden station

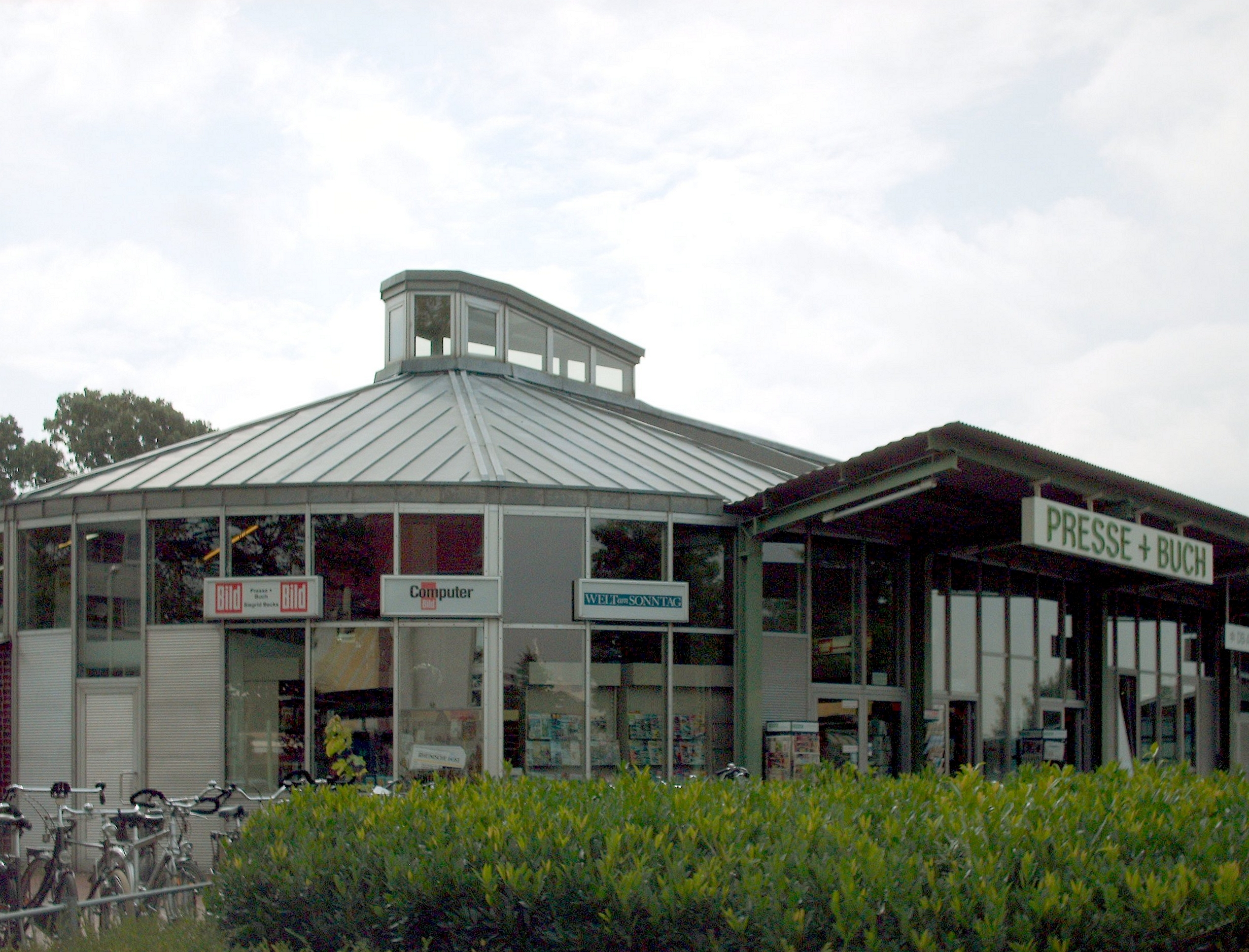
Bocholt station
