= ICE 3 =

German high speed train model

DB Class 403/406
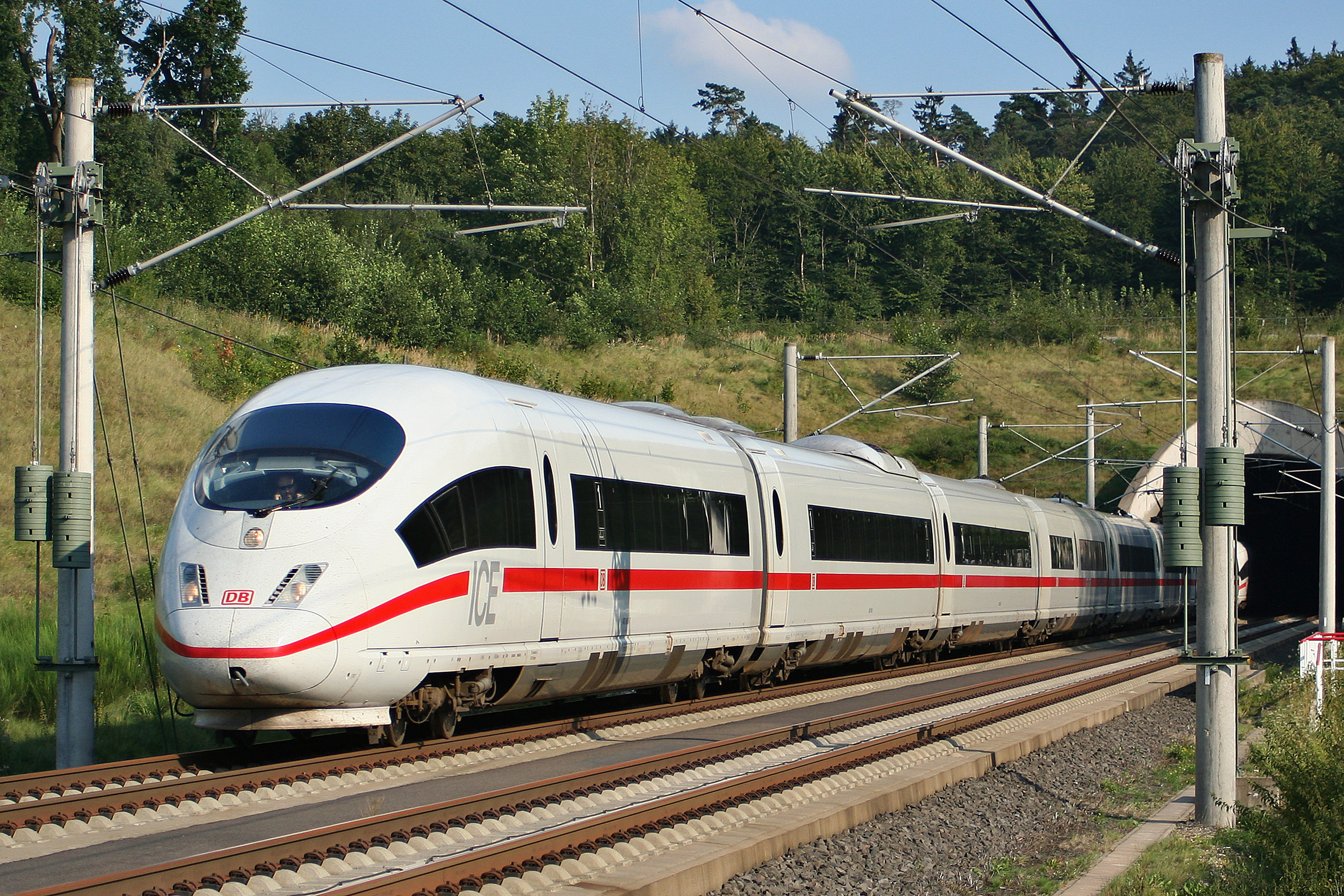
- ICE 3 on the Cologne–Frankfurt high-speed rail line

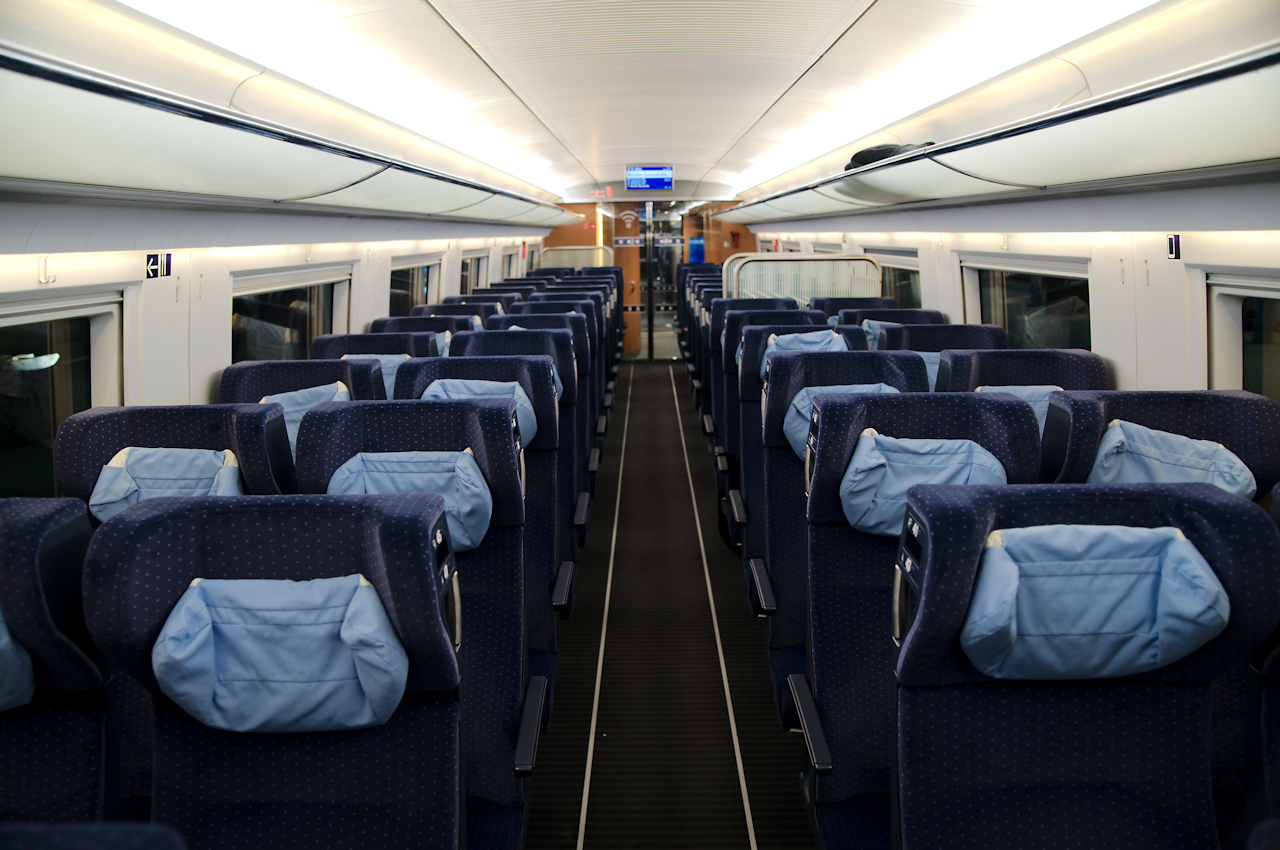
- Second-class interior
- Stock type: Electric multiple unit
- In service: 2000–present
- Manufacturers: Siemens, ADtranz, Bombardier
- Designers: N+P Industrial Design, Siemens
- Family name: Velaro
- Number built: Class 403: 50; Class 406: 17 (retired); Class 407: 17; Class 408: 90 (on order)
- Formation: 8 cars per trainset
- Capacity: Class 403: 441; Class 406: 430; Class 407: 460; Class 408: 455
- Operators: DB Fernverkehr; Nederlandse Spoorwegen

Specifications
- Car body construction: Aluminum
- Train length: Class 403/406: 200.84 m (658 ft 11 in); Class 407/408: 200.72 m (658 ft 6 in)
- Car length: Cab car: 25.835 m (84 ft 9.1 in); Intermediate car: 24.775 m (81 ft 3.4 in)
- Width: 2.950 m (9 ft 8.1 in)
- Height: 3.89 m (12 ft 9 in)
- Wheel diameter: New: 920 mm (36 in); Worn: 830 mm (33 in)
- Wheelbase: Wheelsets: 2,500 mm (98 in); Bogie centers: 17,375 mm (684.1 in)
- Maximum speed: Class 403/406: 330 km/h (205 mph); Class 407/408: 320 km/h (200 mph)
- Weight: ICE 3: 409 t (902,000 lb); ICE 3M: 435 t (959,000 lb)
- Traction system: Class 403/406: Siemens SIBAS 32 GTO-VVVF; Class 407/408: Siemens SIBAC IGBT-VVVF
- Traction motors: Class 403/406: 16 × Siemens 1TB2019-0GB02
- Power output: 8,000 kW (10,728 hp)
- Tractive effort: 300 kN (67,443 lbf) starting; 270 kN (60,698 lbf) continuous at 106 km/h (66 mph)
- Gearbox: Class 403/406: Voith SE-380
- Electric systems: Overhead line; 15 kV 16.7 Hz AC; 25 kV 50 Hz AC (Class 406/407/408); 1,500 V DC (Class 406/407/408); 3,000 V DC (Class 406/407/408)
- Current collection: Pantograph
- UIC classification: Bo′Bo′+2′2′+Bo′Bo′+2′2′+2′2′+Bo′Bo′+2′2′+Bo′Bo′
- Bogies: Siemens SF 500
- Safety systems: ICE 3: Sifa, PZB90, LZB; ICE 3M: Sifa, PZB90, LZB80, Crocodile, TVM430, KVB, ATB, ETCS
- Track gauge: 1,435 mm (4 ft 8 1/2 in) standard gauge

ICE 3 (standing for Intercity-Express) is a family of high-speed electric multiple unit trains operated by Deutsche Bahn. It currently includes classes 403, 407 and 408 which are additionally specified as ICE 3, New ICE 3 and ICE 3neo respectively and formerly the retired class 406 or ICE 3M. ICE 3 trains have a maximum speed of 300 km/h (186 mph) in Germany, 320 km/h (200 mph) when travelling on the French high-speed rail lines. Class 403 are theoretically permitted to go up to a maximum speed of 330 km/h (210 mph) when travelling on the high-speed route between Frankfurt and Cologne.

Based on the ICE 3M/F, Siemens developed its Siemens Velaro train family with versions used in Germany, Belgium, France, the United Kingdom, the Netherlands, Spain, China, Russia and Turkey.

== Class 403 ==
The design goal of the ICE 3 (Class 403) was to create a higher-powered, lighter train than its predecessors such as the ICE 2 and the ICE 1. This was achieved by distributing its 16 traction motors underneath the whole train, thus ICE 3 trains are electric multiple units (EMUs). The train is certified for 330 km/h (210 mph) and has reached 368 km/h (229 mph) on trial runs. On regular Intercity-Express services they run at up to 300 km/h (190 mph), the maximum design speed of German high-speed lines.

Because the train does not have power cars, the whole length of the train is available for passenger seats, including the first car. The lounge seats are located directly behind the driver, separated only by a glass wall.

The 50 sets were ordered in 1994 and specifically designed for the new high-speed line between Frankfurt and Cologne. They were built by a consortium led by Siemens and Adtranz (which became Bombardier Transportation).

For the EXPO 2000 in Hanover, Deutsche Bahn provided 120 additional train services. Some of these special services were operated by ICE trains and labelled "ExpoExpress" (EXE). These services also constituted the first widespread use of the then-new ICE 3 train sets, presenting them to the domestic and international general public.

On 11 April 2017, Deutsche Bahn announced the modernisation programme called ICE 3 Redesign for its 66-unit ICE 3 fleet to be completed by the end of 2020. The renovation involves replacing the seats, tables, and floor coverings. The six-seat compartment rooms are eliminated from the second class section to increase the number of seats and add more luggage compartments. In addition, the number of disability seating has been increased to two; however, no integrated wheelchair lift has been installed, and no disability seating is offered in the first-class section. The seats in some Bordrestaurant have been converted to the red bench seating while Bordbistro receives the new stand tables. The cabin illumination is provided by LED lamps, providing more illumination, while the reading lamps are eliminated. The seat reservation panels are moved from the walls above the windows to the seat headrests per EU directive on accessibilities: the new panel has bigger and more visible white lettering and Braille. The yellow LCD information monitors in the antechambers are replaced with larger full-colour LED displays, showing the map, train number, speed, and other pertinent information. The new smaller displays are attached to the ceiling above the aisle throughout the cabins.

== Class 406 (retired) ==
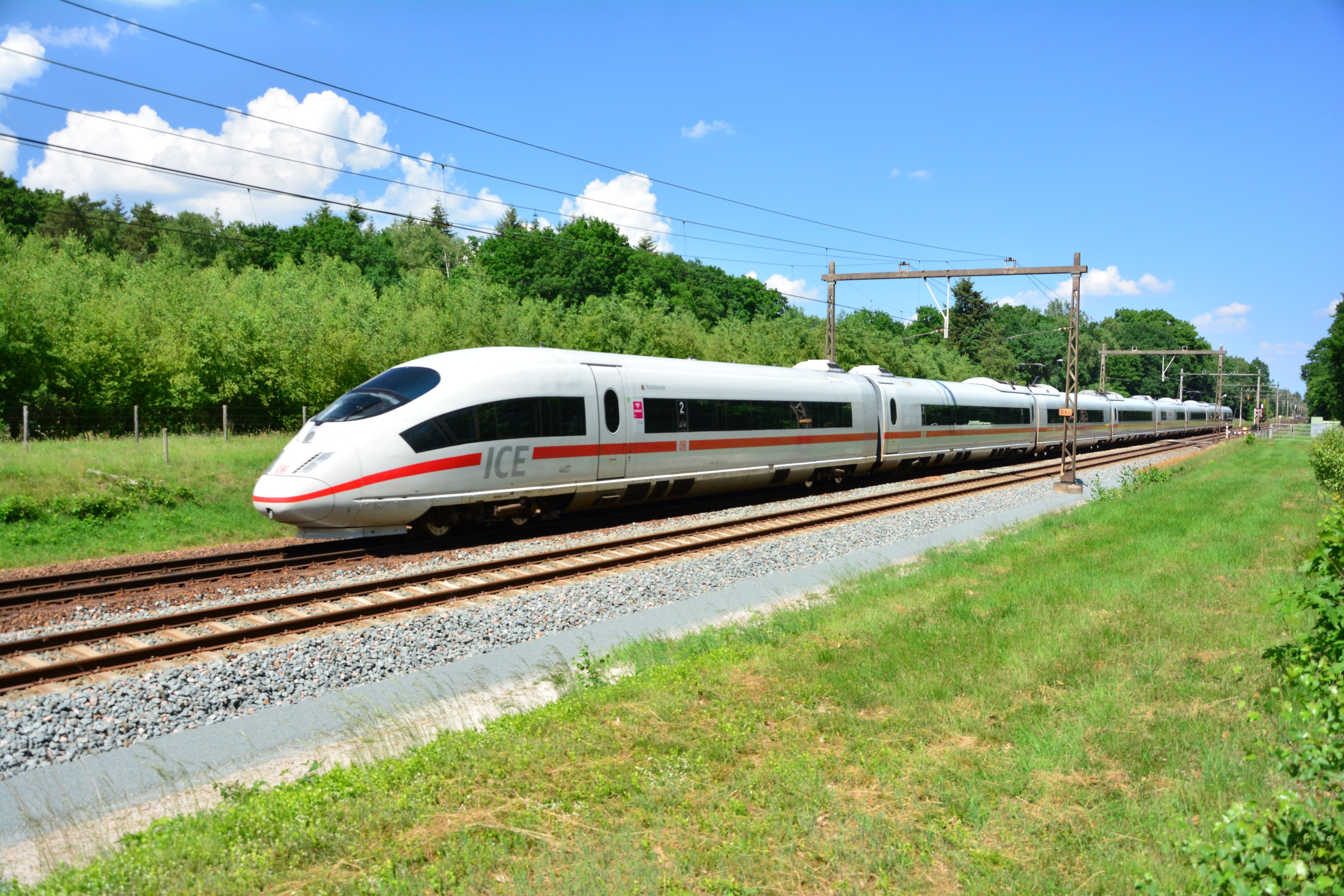
A now-retired Class 406 trainset

=== Development ===
The ICE 3M (Class 406; M for multisystem), which has been retired in April 2025, was developed to operate international services under the four different railway electrification systems in use on Europe's main lines and with support for various train protection systems. The Deutsche Bahn (DB) ordered 13 of these units in 1994, the NS (Nederlandse Spoorwegen) four, making sure that the demands of the Dutch rail network are taken care of. Though these trains carried NS logos, the DB and NS trains together formed a pool and therefore, the NS trains operated DB services as well. In 2007 the train was licensed for operation in the Netherlands, Belgium, and France. On the French LGV Est, some trains reached a regular top speed of 320 km/h (200 mph). The 17 class 406 sets were built by the same consortium as the Class 403.

=== Operations ===
They were first introduced in November 2000 on services between Cologne and Amsterdam. Since December 2002, they have also been operating three journeys daily each way between Frankfurt and Brussels (increased to four per day since December 2010).

In Belgium, the train was licensed in 2002 to run on the classic 3 kV DC lines with speeds up to 160 km/h (100 mph) and, from December 2004, also on the new 25 kV AC high-speed lines, but initially limited to 250 km/h (155 mph) instead of 300 km/h (190 mph). Problems with flying gravel and its frictionless linear eddy current brake came up during testing. In order to limit the creation of tornado-like vortices that pick up gravel and to limit damage from flying gravel to the train, spoilers have been added under the car joints, under the carbody next to the bogies and under the powered axles on the bogies. The linear eddy current brake, which is required for higher speeds, cannot yet be used, because the magnetic field would rip off the magnetic covers of some trackside equipment; those covers will have to be replaced by non-magnetic ones according to the EU Technical Specifications for Interoperability for international rail traffic in Europe.

As in Belgium, licensing procedures for France took five years to be completed. In Switzerland, licensing took only six months. Trial runs were completed in late 2005 and the same two problems were encountered as in Belgium: loose gravel damage and possible side-effects of the brakes. ICE 3Ms were allowed on the LGV Est and started service there on 20 June 2007, mixed with TGVs. Since December 2007, DB operates ICE 3M trains from Frankfurt central station to Paris Est, initially with five daily runs between both cities. The six trains for running into France (designated ICE-3 MF, indicating multisystem France) were modified at Bombardier's Hennigsdorf plant and were extensively tested on Siemens' test site in Wegberg-Wildenrath before the modified trains re-entered commercial service. Despite this, the "French" subset of six class 406 trains have suffered from reliability problems, so that some Paris–Frankfurt services are operated instead by French TGVs (currently TGV 2N2 'Euroduplex' as of 2015) under the "Alleo" joint venture between DB and SNCF.

=== Demise ===
Until 2024, class 406 trains were used for cross-border runs between Netherlands, Germany, Belgium, and France. However, due to progressive wear of the electromechanical parts of their multiple electrification system with additional insufficient dispatch reliability during the course of their operations, all of them were gradually replaced with Class 407/408 trainsets and were used for domestic services within Germany until April 2025 when they have been retired from service and put up for sale.

On 12 April 2025, Deutsche Bahn held a farewell trip for the ICE 3M units, which operated from Hannover to Frankfurt (Main) Hauptbahnhof via Amsterdam Centraal.

== Class 407 ==
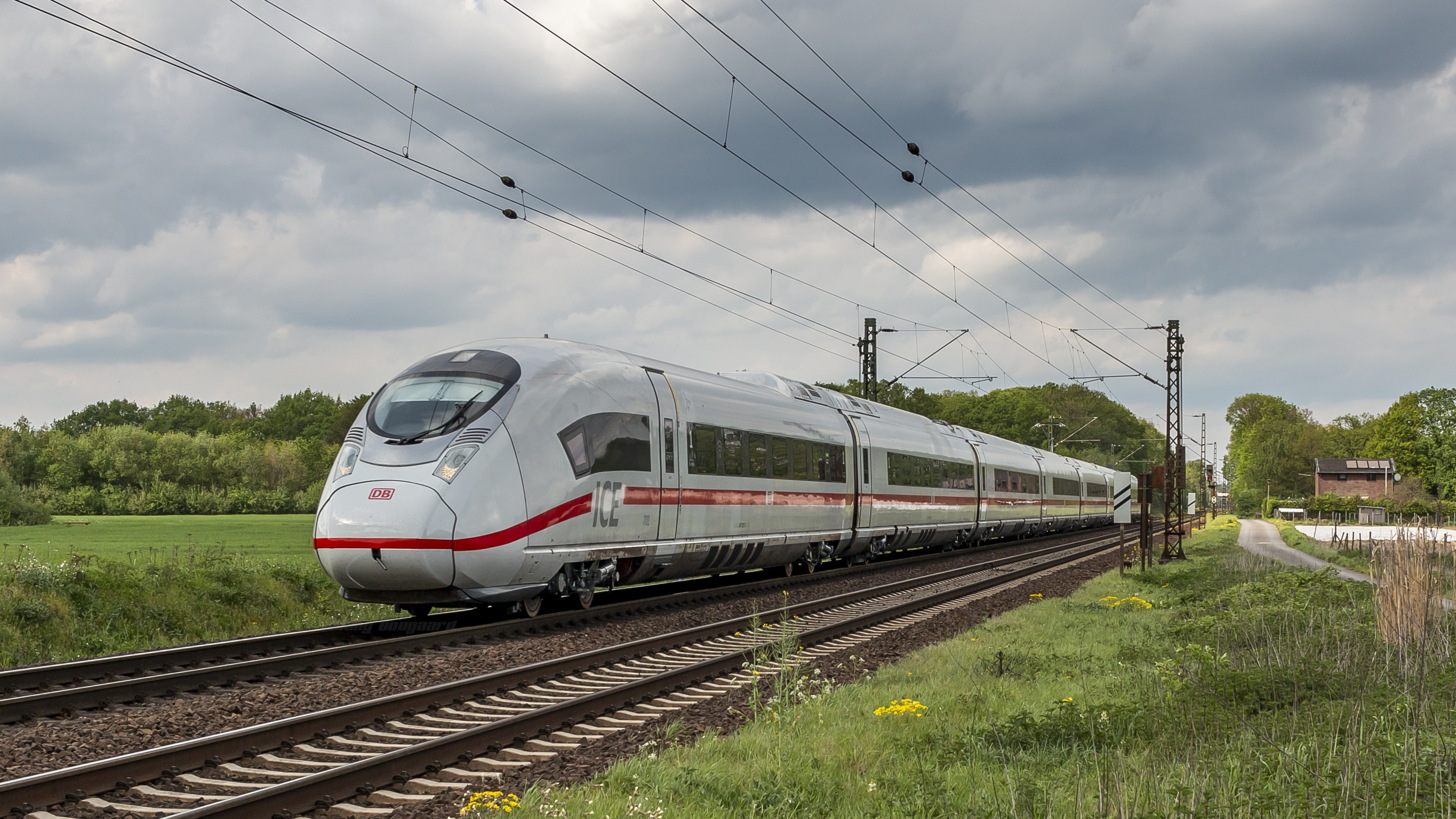
A Siemens Velaro Class 407 trainset

Deutsche Bahn placed an order for fifteen trains valued €500 million in November 2008. On 18 April 2010, Deutsche Bahn presented the first Velaro D at Siemens' Krefeld plant. It is designed for operation at up to 320 km/h (200 mph), is wider, quieter and more energy-saving, should be less susceptible to malfunctions than its predecessor, and incorporates additional crashworthiness and fire safety measures. The new train was supposed to be used mainly for international services from Germany to France, Belgium and the Netherlands. The new type's safety measures are in line with the new specifications for operating passenger trains inside the Channel Tunnel, allowing the Class 407 to be used on the services that DB planned to operate from London to Amsterdam and Frankfurt in 2015. The planned service to London was never introduced.

The new train was designated Class 407 and was originally scheduled to enter service at the end of 2011. This date has since been postponed several times. In December 2013 the first four trains delivered to DB were licensed for domestic operation as multiple units and started with passenger traffic. Four more trains were expected for delivery in spring 2014, whereas the remainder of eight trains shall be used by Siemens for test runs in France and Belgium to gain type approval there.

In June 2011, Deutsche Bahn ordered one additional Velaro D set in order to replace an ICE3MF set damaged in an accident in August 2010.

== Class 408 ==
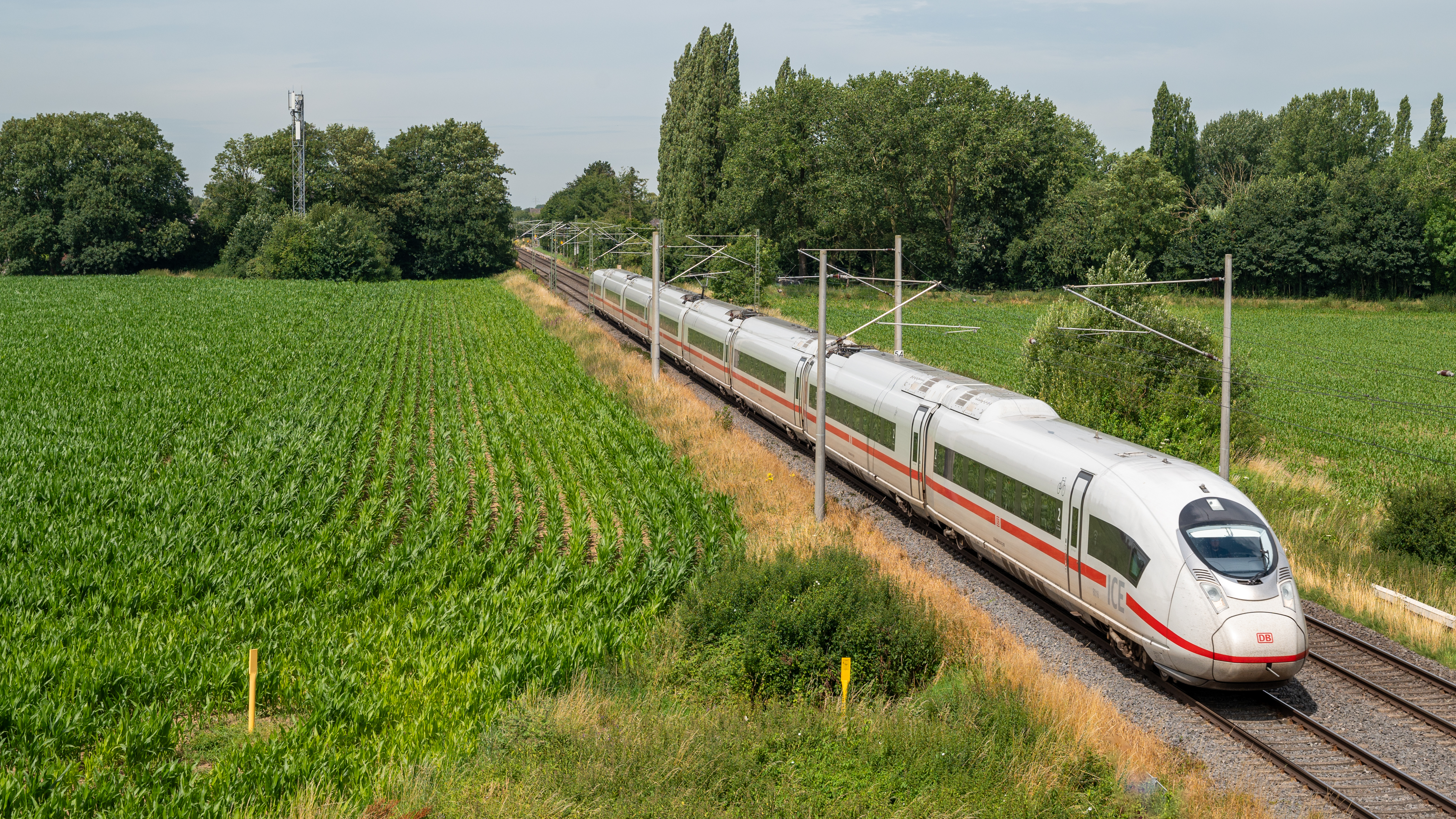
A Siemens Velaro Class 408 trainset on its way from Amsterdam to Frankfurt am Main

In 2019 Deutsche Bahn needed more trains to run on national and international high-speed tracks. Siemens offered them an evolution of the Velaro D equipped with multi-system capability and hence labelled Velaro MS. In 2020 Deutsche Bahn ordered 30 trainsets for delivery starting in 2022. The trains are designed for operation at 320 km/h and will be deployed from the end of 2022 on routes that use the Cologne – Frankfurt high speed line which is designed for operation at 300 km/h.

The first of the trains, called ICE 3neo by Deutsche Bahn and classed as 408, was completed in late 2021 with test runs started immediately. In February 2022, the order volume increased to 73 trains and the first train was shown to journalists. All 73 trains are supposed to be in service by early 2029. In May 2023 DB announced to order the remaining 17 options of Class 408-trains, so the total order rose to 90.

== See also ==
- List of high-speed trains
