= Hamminkeln =

- Town
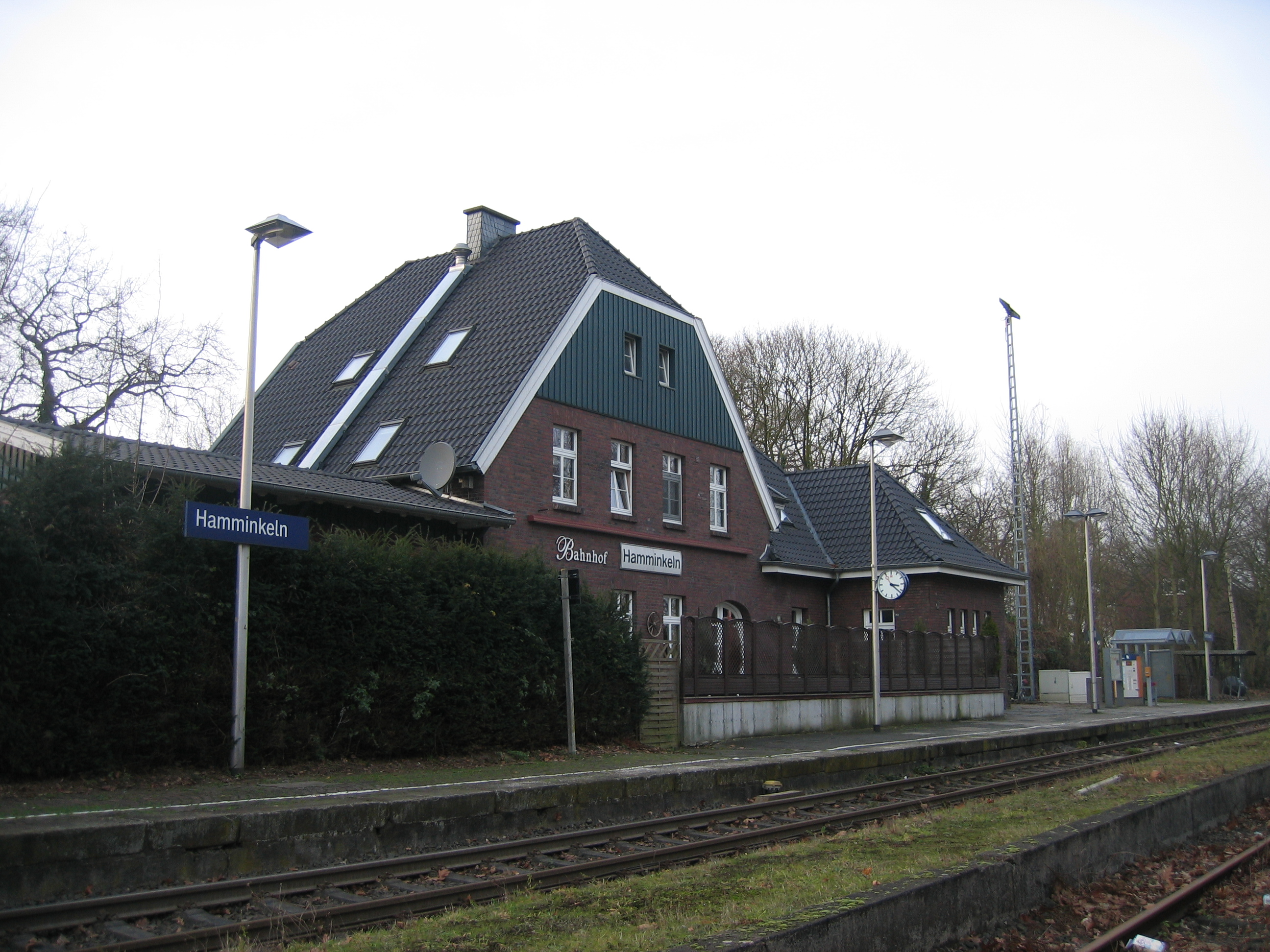
- Hamminkeln station

- Coat of arms

- Location of Hamminkeln within Wesel district
- Interactive map of Hamminkeln
- Location within Germany Location within North Rhine-Westphalia
- Coordinates: 51°43′55″N 6°35′27″E
- Country: Germany
- State: North Rhine-Westphalia
- Admin. region: Düsseldorf
- District: Wesel

Government
  - Mayor (2020–25): Bernd Romanski

Area
  - Total: 164.53 km^{2} (63.53 sq mi)
- Elevation: 21 m (69 ft)

Population (2025-12-31)
  - Total: 26,839
  - Density: 163.13/km^{2} (422.49/sq mi)
- Time zone: UTC+01:00 (CET)
  - Summer (DST): UTC+02:00 (CEST)
- Postal codes: 46499
- Dialling codes: 02852, 0281, 02850, 02856, 02857, 02865, 02871, 02872, 02873
- Vehicle registration: WES
- Website: www.hamminkeln.de

Hamminkeln (German pronunciation: [haˈmɪŋkl̩n]) is a town in the district of Wesel, in North Rhine-Westphalia, Germany. It is situated on the river Issel, approximately 10 kilometers north of Wesel and 15 km south of Bocholt. It is twinned with Sedgefield, United Kingdom and the largest town in the district of Wesel.

The town is separated into the villages Ringenberg, Dingden, Mehrhoog, Brünen, Marienthal, Loikum and Wertherbruch.

The city has 3 major employers:

- Thunderbike - A motorcycle manufacturer and well known customizer of Harley-Davidson
- Max Bögl - A manufacturer of concrete parts for tunnels and bridges, who has worked on projects like Eurotunnel
- Bonita - A big fashion brand in Germany

Hamminkeln has its own exit from the Bundesautobahn 3 which is used for many nearby larger cities.

== Population ==
Historical population

Year	Pop.	±% p.a.
1965	15,087	—
1970	16,631	+1.97%
1975	19,453	+3.18%
1980	21,861	+2.36%
1985	22,739	+0.79%
1990	24,659	+1.63%
1995	26,480	+1.44%

Year	Pop.	±% p.a.
2000	27,161	+0.51%
2005	27,478	+0.23%
2010	27,711	+0.17%
2015	26,996	−0.52%
2020	26,962	−0.03%
2025	26,839	−0.09%

Source: Landesdatabank Nordrhein-Westfalen

== Government ==
Hamminkeln has had nine mayors since 1946:

- Willi Finke (1894–1953) was mayor and main administrative official for two months from 23 January 1946 to 15 March 1946.
- Gustav Schippers (1882–1961) was mayor from 24 June 1946 to 13 January 1961. In this time there were three main administrative officials: Karlheinz Kürten (born 1915) from 15 March 1946 to 30 September 1946, Dr. Otto Weyer (1897–1969) from 1 October 1946 to 31 October 1953 and Josef Leeuw (1903–1976) from 21 December 1953 to 12 November 1965.
- Albert Busch (1896–1973) from 27 March 1961 to 3 December 1970.
- Adolf Bovenkerk (1933–2016) from 3 December 1970 to 31 December 1974.
- Bernhard Hoffmann (1912–1979) was mayor until July 1979. In this time Erich Tellmann (1929–2011) was main administrative official from 1 January 1966 to 31 December 1974, and until July 1987 he was town manager.
- Heinrich Meyers (1938–2000) was the next mayor from October 1979 to December 2000. From July 1987 to September 1999 Bruno Gerwers (born 1938) was the town manager.
- Holger Schlierf (born 1954) was the first mayor without party affiliation (his predecessors having all been CDU members), from June 2001 to October 2015
- The current mayor is Bernd Romanski (born 1959), a member of the SPD.

== Gallery ==
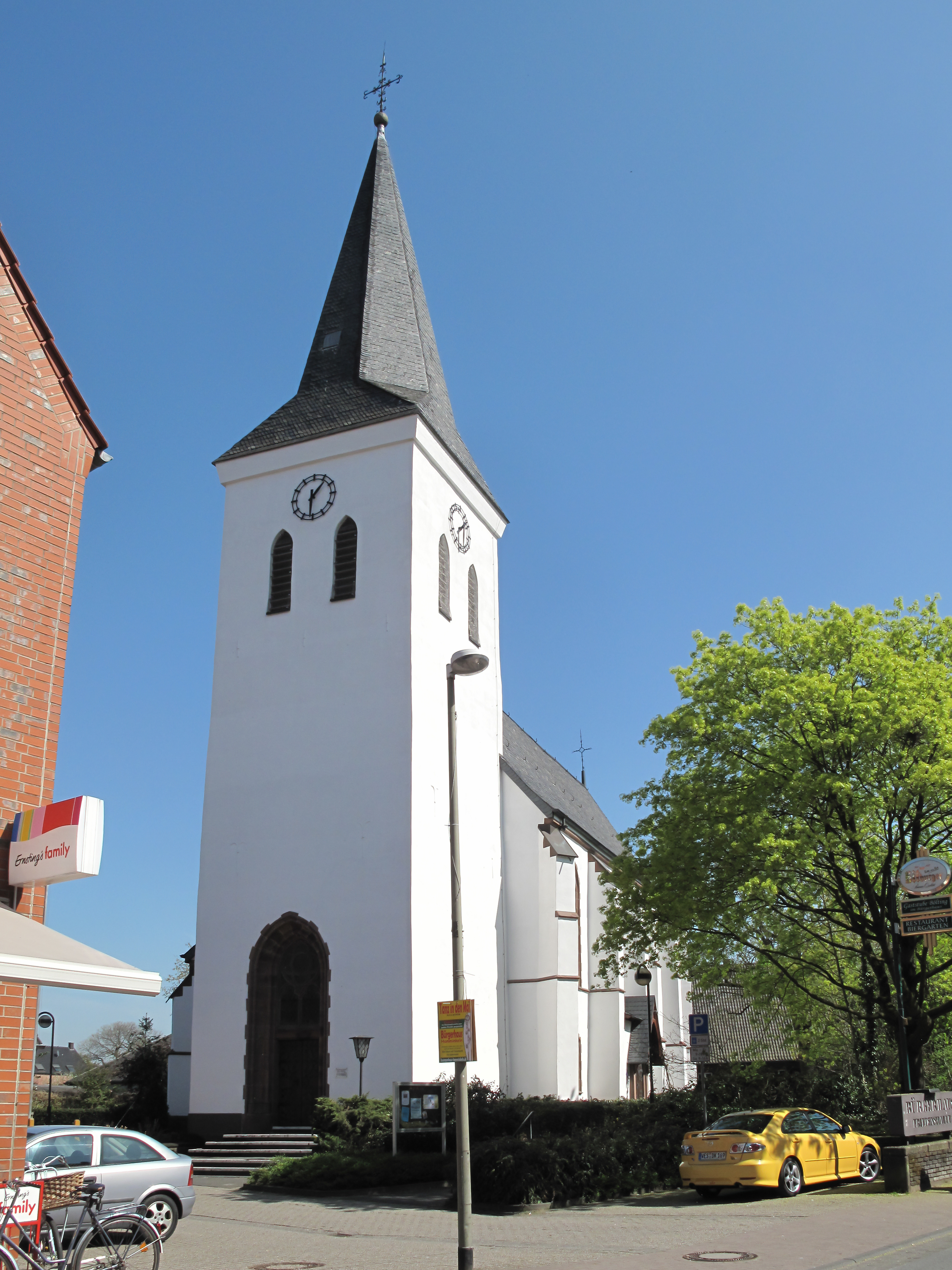
Hamminkeln, church

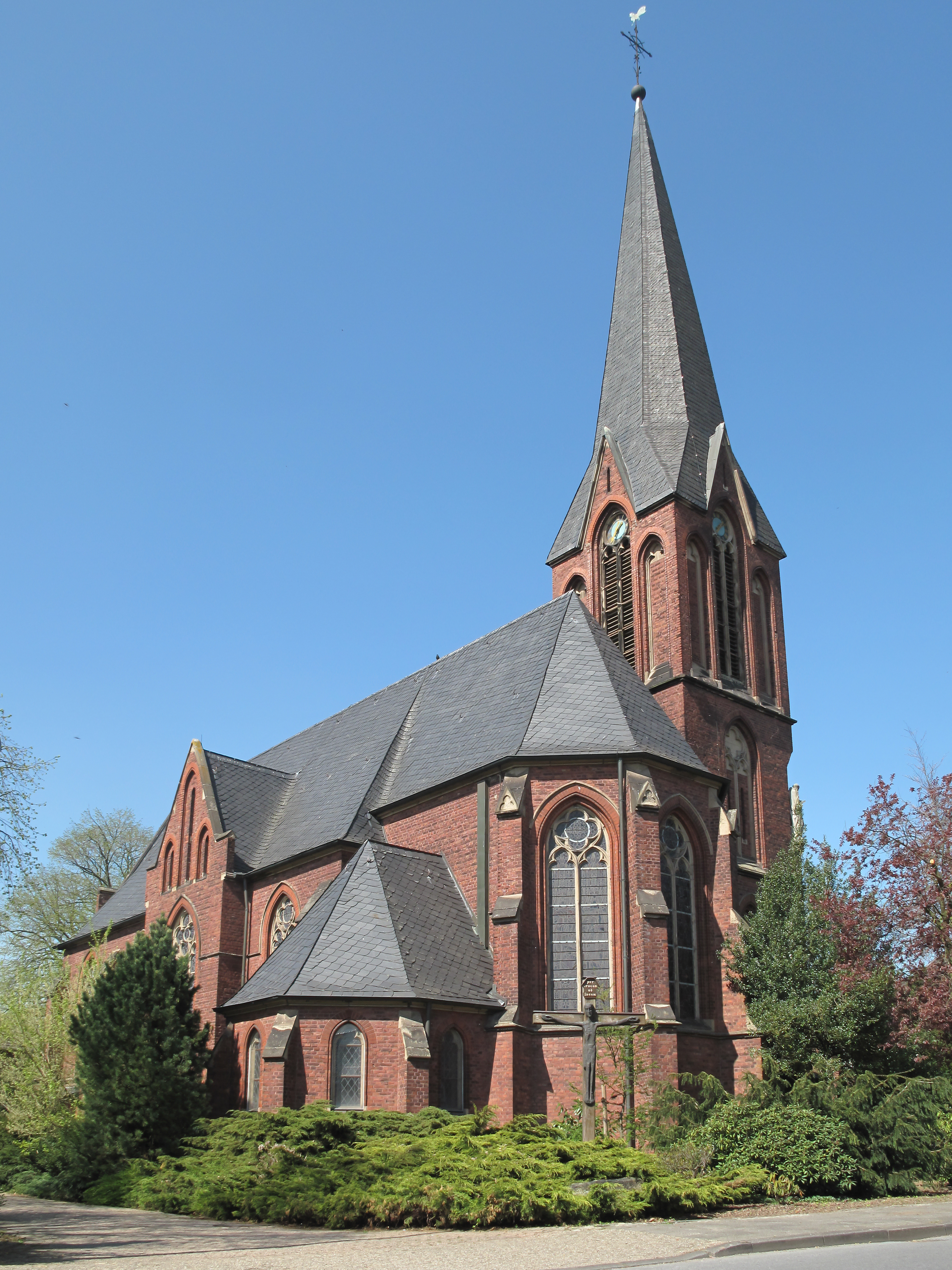
Hamminkeln, church

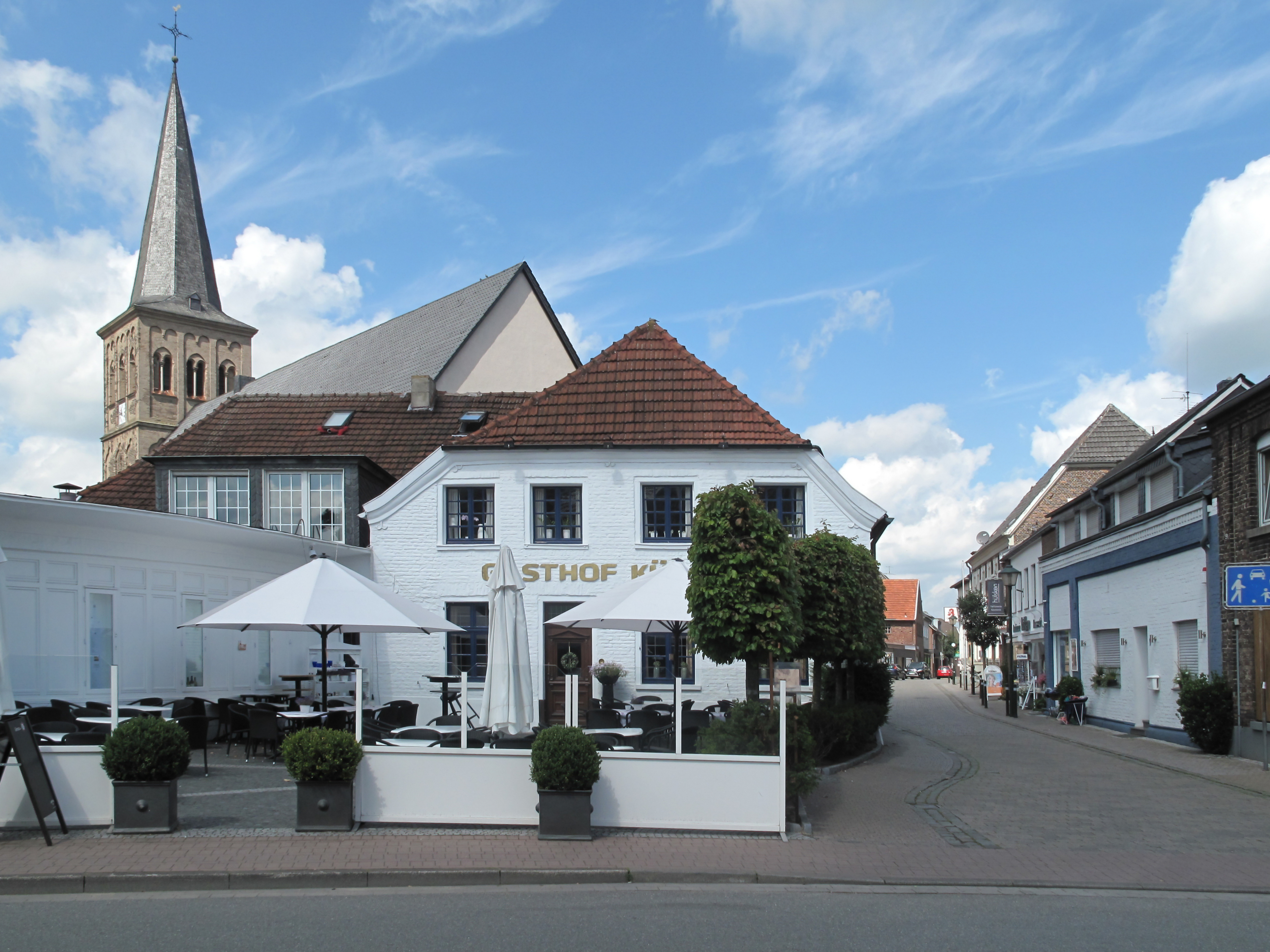
Dingden, church (die Sankt Pancratius Kirche) and Gasthof

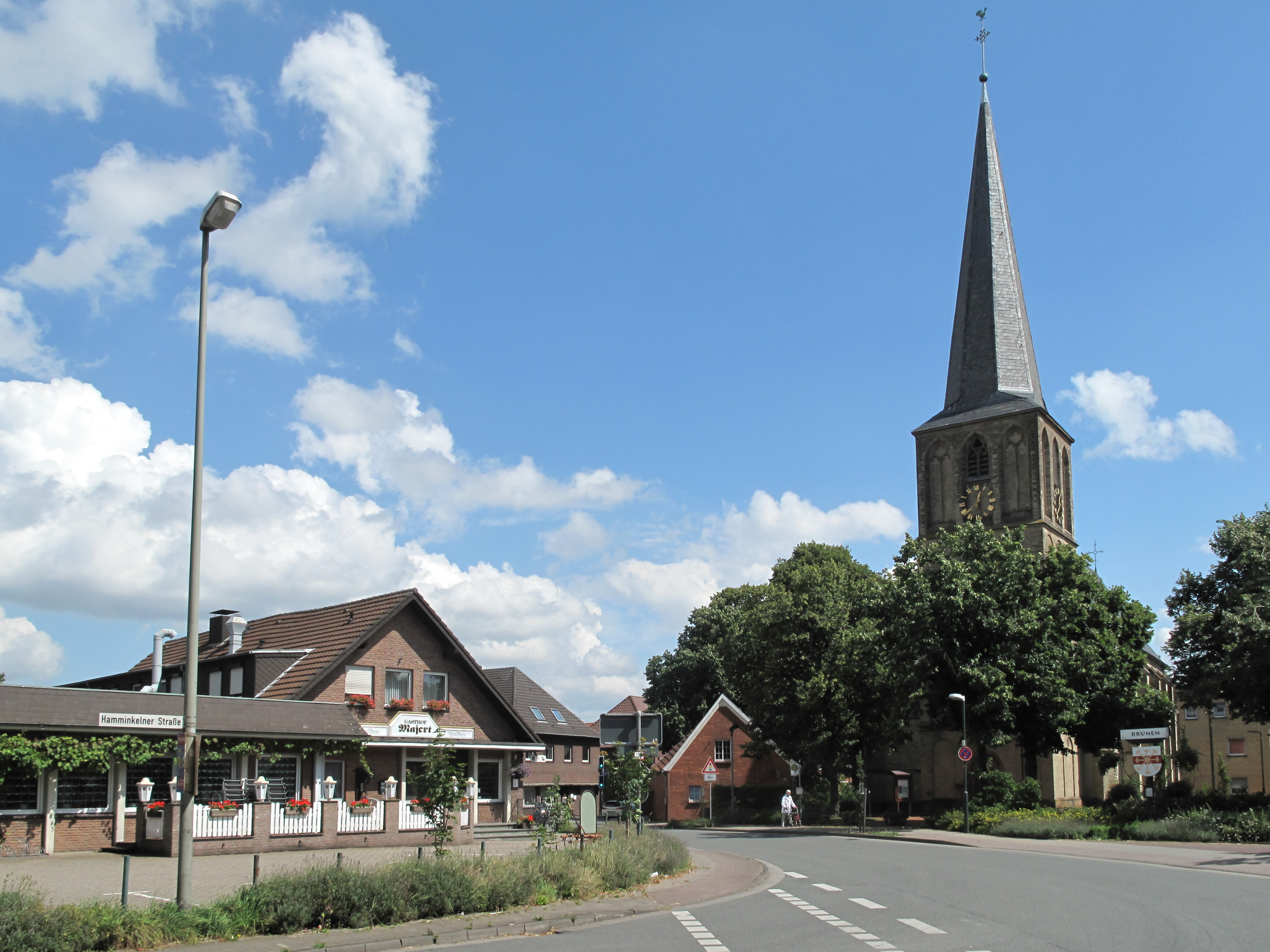
Brünen, reformed church

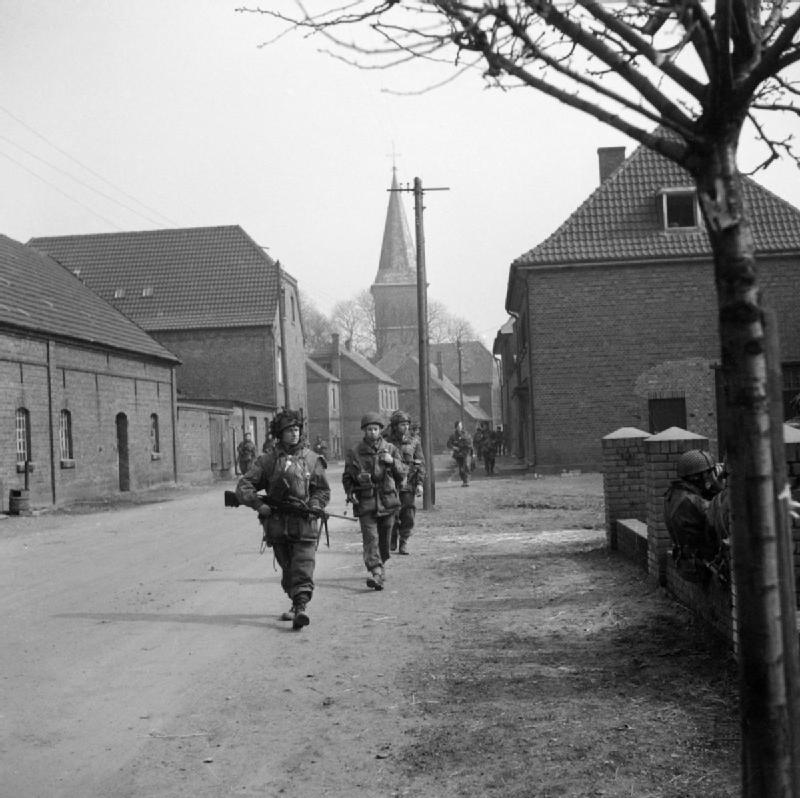
British paratroopers in Hamminkeln on 25 March 1945.
