= Rhein-IJssel-Express =

German and Dutch rail service

RE 19 Rhein-IJssel-Express
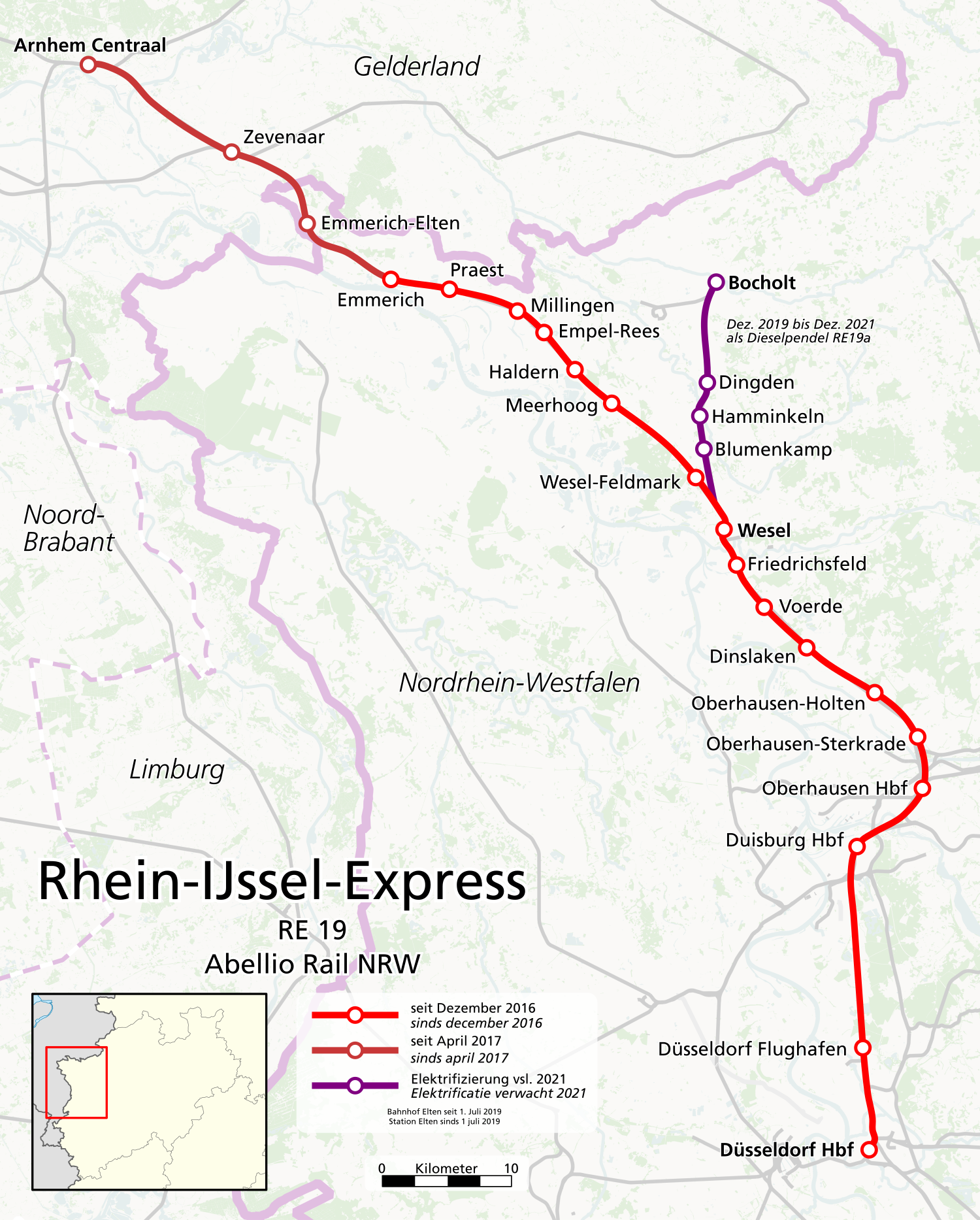
- Map of the route

Overview
- Status: VRR
- Locale: North Rhine-Westphalia, Germany
- Current operator: VIAS
- Former operator: Abellio Rail NRW

Route
- Distance travelled: 123 kilometres (76 mi)

Technical
- Timetable number: RE 19

The Rhein-IJssel-Express (RE 19) is a Regional-Express service in German state of North Rhine-Westphalia and the Dutch province of Gelderland. It runs from Düsseldorf to Arnhem, with a section splitting at Wesel to serve Bocholt. VIAS operates the service on behalf of Verkehrsverbund Rhein-Ruhr (VRR).

There are three other international Regional-Expresses in North Rhine-Westphalia: the Maas-Wupper-Express, the LIMAX (Liège-Maastricht-Aachen-Express) and the euregioAIXpress (between Aachen and Liège via Verviers).

== History ==
Until December 2016, the service was branded as Regionalbahn line Der Weseler (RB 35) from Duisburg to Wesel and operated towards Emmerich, Düsseldorf or Cologne during the peak in the peak direction. It was launched in 1998 with the introduction of the NRW-Takt (Clock-face timetable). The line was operated with 425/426 class sets and sometimes with locomotive-hauled Silberling carriages by DB Regio NRW.

Except for a test service that ran from December 2005 to June 2006 as Der Arnheimer (RB 34) between Emmerich and Arnhem, there had been no cross-border regional services between Amsterdam and Cologne since the cessation of the Eilzug (regional fast train) service on the Oberhausen–Arnhem railway in the 1980s. Cross-border journeys have since then only been possible by bus or ICE International services.

In order to again offer an attractive cross-border regional service, the Rhein-IJssel-Express was extended from Emmerich via Zevenaar to Arnhem on 6 April 2017, where it connects to the InterCity, regional sprinter services of the Nederlandse Spoorwegen (Dutch Railways), as well as to local trains (Stoptrein) operated by Breng and Arriva. Between Zevenaar and Arnhem, the, RE 19 complements the Dutch Arnhem–Doetinchem–Winterswijk (operated by Arriva) and Arnhem–Doetinchem (operated by Breng) local services.

Another component of the tender of December 2016 was the operation of the non-electrified Wesel–Bocholt line. The Der Bocholter regional service (formerly the RB 32) was introduced on this line from Wesel to Bocholt. Assuming that the electrification of the railway line would be completed in December 2019, allowing portion working of the RE 19 line from Wesel, the line number RB 32 was re-assigned to the Rhein-Emscher-Bahn in advance of the 2019 timetable change. This meant that the Der Bocholter had to be assigned a new line number. The service was designated RE 19a until the completion of electrification. VIAS replaced Abellio Rail NRW as operator at the end of 2021. Electrification of the Wesel–Bocholt line was completed in February 2022 and the services were subsequently integrated.

== Rolling stock ==
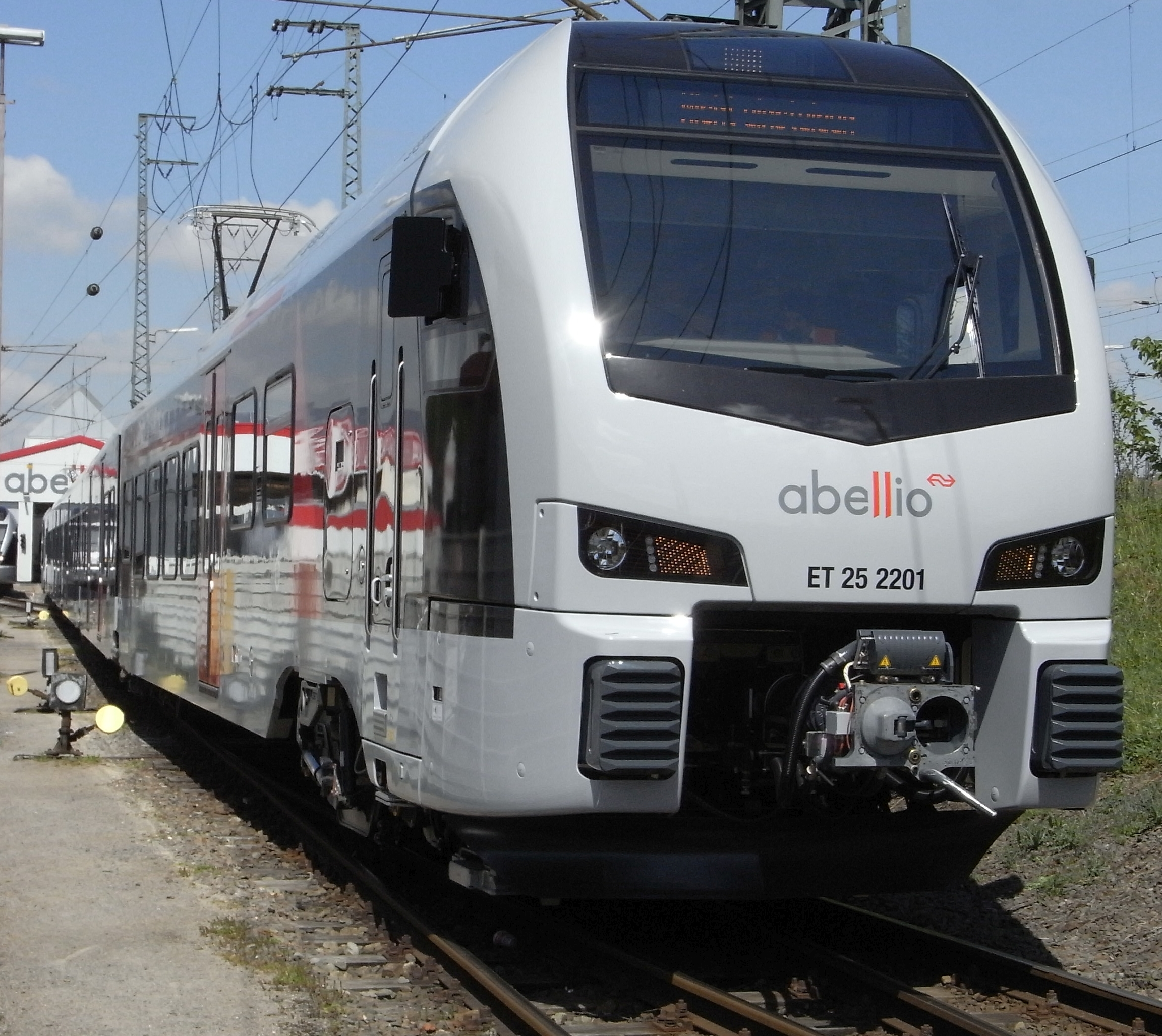
Stadler Flirt 3 prepared for the Rhein-IJssel-Express in the Abellio depot, April 2016

Abellio procured nine Stadler Flirt 3 trainsets for use on the Rhein-IJssel-Express. These are three-system capable:

- 15 kV 16.7 Hz AC (~) for the Düsseldorf–Elten section
- 25 kV 50 Hz AC (~) for the Elten–Zevenaar section
- 1.5 kV DC (=) for the Zevenaar–Arnhem section

Diesel-powered Alstom Coradia LINT sets were used for the RE 19a service until the line was electrified in February 2022. These sets are being used by the new operator, VIAS.

A new workshop was built in Duisburg by Abellio to maintain the trainsets.

== Route ==
The Regional-Express runs on the following railways:

- Cologne–Duisburg railway from Düsseldorf to Duisburg
- Duisburg–Dortmund railway from Duisburg to Oberhausen
- Oberhausen–Arnhem railway from Oberhausen to Arnhem, over the whole length from 2017
- Bocholt–Wesel railway, over the whole length from 2018.

== Hellweg-Express ==
In the early days of the NRW clock-face timetable, there was another Regional-Express service that was designated as the RE 19. This service, called the Hellweg-Express, was operated by DB Regio NRW on the route from Dortmund via Unna to Warburg from 1998 to 2002. It was replaced at the timetable change on 15 December 2002 by the RB 59 Hellweg-Bahn and the RB 89.

== See also ==
- List of regional rail lines in North Rhine-Westphalia
