= Oberhausen-Holten station =

Railway station in Oberhausen, Germany

Oberhausen Holten
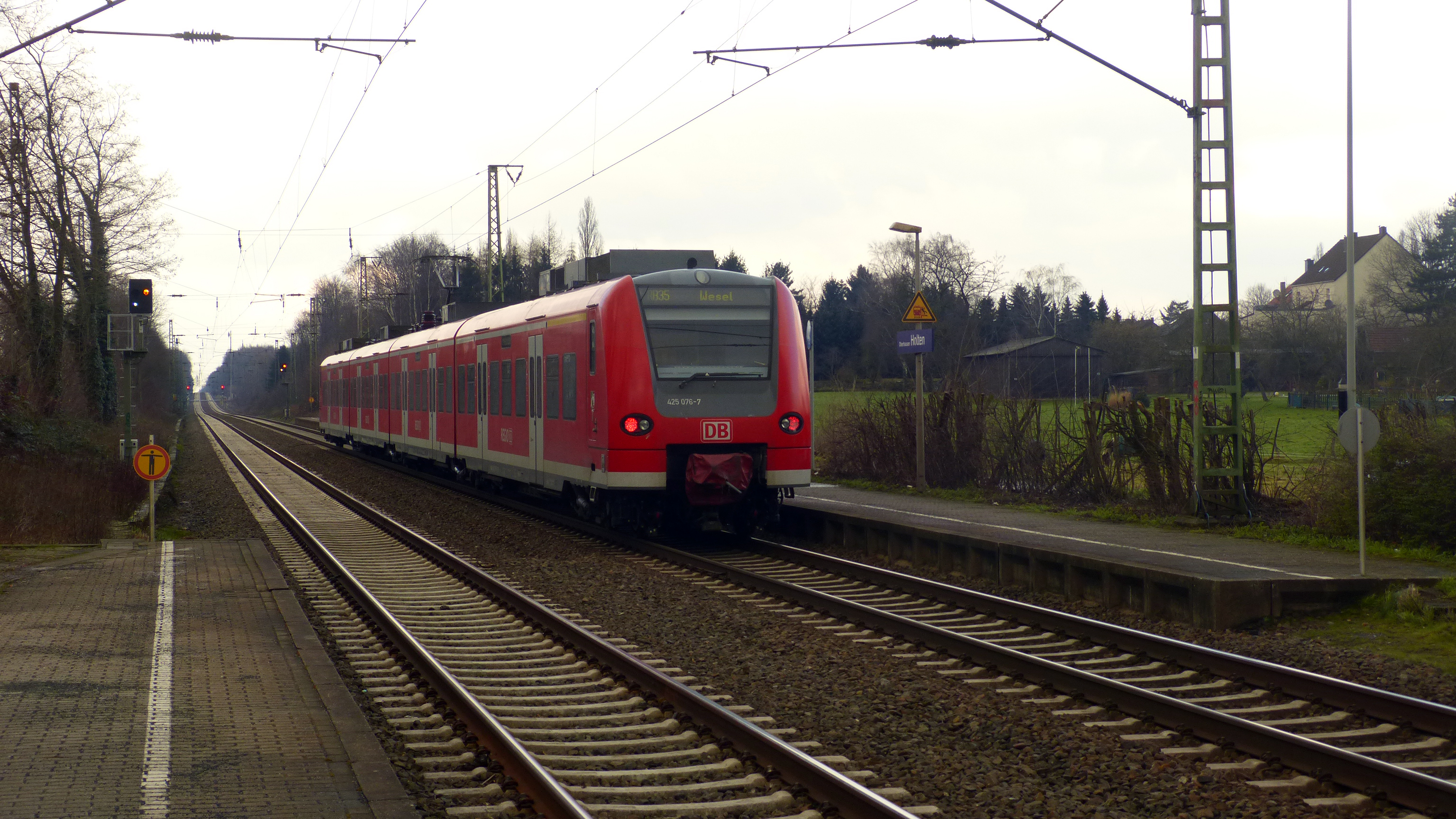

General information
- Location: Oberhausen, NRW, Germany
- Coordinates: 51°32′03″N 6°48′39″E
- Line: Arnhem-Oberhausen railway
- Platforms: 2
- Tracks: 2

Construction
- Accessible: Yes

Other information
- Station code: 4649
- DS100 code: EOHT
- IBNR: 8004540
- Category: 5
- Fare zone: VRR: 242
- Website: www.bahnhof.de

History
- Opened: 1886

Services
Preceding station	National Express Germany	Following station
Dinslaken towards Wesel	RE 5 (Rhein-Express)	Oberhausen-Sterkrade towards Koblenz Hbf
Preceding station	VIAS	Following station
Dinslaken towards Arnhem Centraal or Bocholt	RE 19	Oberhausen-Sterkrade towards Düsseldorf Hbf
Preceding station	DB Regio NRW	Following station
Dinslaken towards Wesel	RE 49	Oberhausen-Sterkrade towards Wuppertal Hbf
Location
- Location within North Rhine-Westphalia

Oberhausen-Holten is a railway station in Oberhausen, North Rhine-Westphalia, Germany. The station is located on the Arnhem-Oberhausen railway. The train services are operated by Deutsche Bahn and Abellio Deutschland.

== History ==
The Haltestelle Holten (Kr. Ruhrort) (Holten (Ruhrort district) halt) was opened in 1886 by the Cologne-Minden Railway Company (Cöln-Mindener Eisenbahn-Gesellschaft, CME) on the Oberhausen–Arnhem line, which had been built on 1 September 1853. A now demolished entrance building was built at that time. The area administered by the mayor of Holten had just been divided into areas administered by the mayor of Sterkrade and by the mayor of Beeck (the smaller, western part) and belonged to the district of Mülheim an der Ruhr.

At the turn of the twentieth century, the stop was upgraded to a station of III OR class. After the Holtener Bruch was drained by the channeling of the Emscher, there were plans to build one of the first German airports there.

Before the First World War, the station was renamed to Bahnhof Holten (Holten station). In 1917, Holten was incorporated into the new town of Sterkrade, which in turn became part of the city of Oberhausen in 1929; however, the station was not named Oberhausen-Holten station until 14 May 1950.

The station was reclassified as a Haltestelle (stopping place) on 28 January 1975 and is now classified as a Haltepunkt (stopping point), following the removal of a siding.

From mid-2014 to the end of 2015, the area at Holten station around the Emmericher Straße/Weseler Straße/Schmachtendorfer Straße/Bahnstraße intersection was upgraded. The intersection has turned into a roundabout and a small bus station with new bicycle boxes has been built on the green area between the station and Emmericher Straße.

== Transport services ==
Oberhausen-Holten station is served (as of 2020) by the following lines (the Wupper-Lippe-Express operates on weekdays only):

Line	Line name	Route	Frequency
RE 5	Rhein-Express	Emmerich – Wesel – Oberhausen-Holten – Duisburg – Düsseldorf – Cologne – Bonn – Remagen – Andernach – Koblenz	60 mins
RE 19	Rhein-IJssel-Express	Arnhem – Emmerich – Wesel – Oberhausen-Holten – Oberhausen – Duisburg – Düsseldorf	60 mins
RE 49	Wupper-Lippe-Express	Wesel – Oberhausen-Holten – Oberhausen – Mülheim – Essen – Wuppertal-Vohwinkel – Wuppertal	60 mins

=== Bus services ===
The station is served by several bus routes operated by Stadtwerke Oberhausen (STOAG) and Niederrheinische Verkehrsbetriebe (NIAG).

== See also ==
- List of railway stations in North Rhine-Westphalia
