= Voerde (Niederrhein) station =

Railway station in North Rhine-Westphalia, Germany

Voerde (Niederrhein)
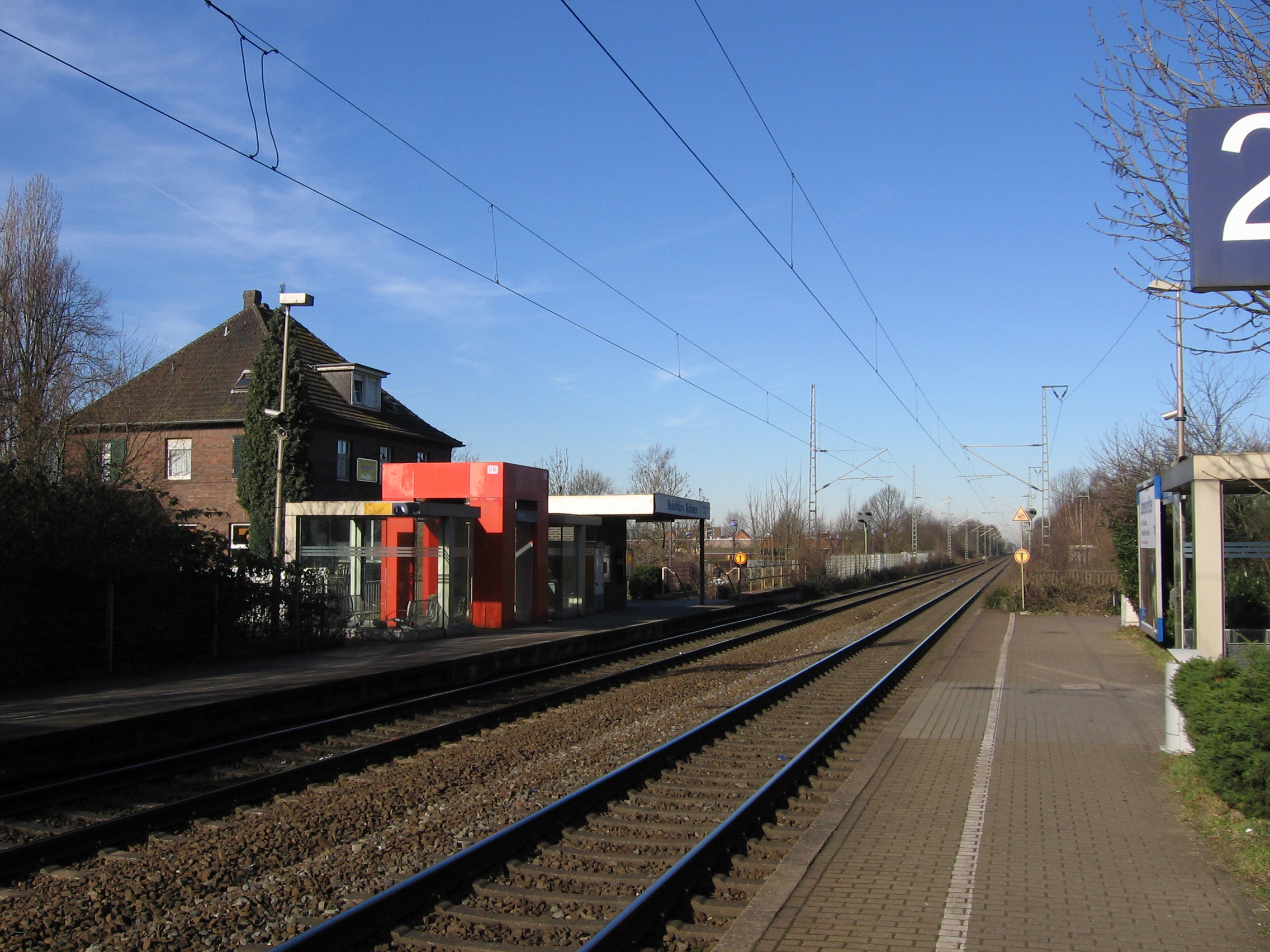

General information
- Location: Voerde, NRW, Germany
- Coordinates: 51°35′50″N 6°41′18″E
- Line: Arnhem-Oberhausen railway
- Platforms: 2
- Tracks: 2

Construction
- Accessible: Yes

Other information
- Station code: 6429
- DS100 code: EVD
- IBNR: 8006098
- Category: 5
- Fare zone: VRR: 133
- Website: www.bahnhof.de

History
- Opened: Between 1880 and 1897

Services
Preceding station	National Express Germany	Following station
Friedrichsfeld (Niederrhein) towards Wesel	RE 5 (Rhein-Express)	Dinslaken towards Koblenz Hbf
Preceding station	VIAS	Following station
Friedrichsfeld (Niederrhein) towards Arnhem Centraal or Bocholt	RE 19	Dinslaken towards Düsseldorf Hbf
Preceding station	DB Regio NRW	Following station
Friedrichsfeld (Niederrhein) towards Wesel	RE 49	Dinslaken towards Wuppertal Hbf
Location
- Location within North Rhine-Westphalia

Voerde is a railway station in Voerde, North Rhine-Westphalia, Germany. The station is located on the Arnhem-Oberhausen railway. The train services are operated by Deutsche Bahn and Abellio Deutschland.

== History ==
The station appears to have been opened sometime between 1880 and 1897 on the Oberhausen–Arnhem line, which was opened by the Cologne-Minden Railway Company (Cöln-Mindener Eisenbahn-Gesellschaft, CME) on 20 October 1856. It was opened under the name of Vörde, but it had been renamed Vörde (Bez.Düsseldorf) by 1905. It was renamed Vörde (Niederrh) by 1914 and Voerde (Niederrh) by 1936.

== Transport services ==
Voerde station is served (as of 2020) by the following lines (the Wupper-Lippe-Express operates on weekdays only):

Line	Line name	Route	Frequency
RE 5	Rhein-Express	Emmerich – Wesel – Voerde – Duisburg – Düsseldorf – Cologne – Bonn – Remagen – Andernach – Koblenz	60 mins
RE 19	Rhein-IJssel-Express	Arnhem – Emmerich – Wesel – Voerde – Oberhausen – Duisburg – Düsseldorf	60 mins
RE 49	Wupper-Lippe-Express	Wesel – Voerde – Oberhausen – Mülheim – Essen – Wuppertal-Vohwinkel – Wuppertal	60 mins

=== Buses ===
It is also served by two bus routes operated by NIAG at hourly intervals:

- 16 (Friedrichsfeld – Heidesiedlung/Oberemmelsum)
- 25 (Friedrichsfeld – Möllen - Dinslaken - Hiesfeld)

== See also ==
- List of railway stations in North Rhine-Westphalia
