= Friedrichsfeld (Niederrhein) station =

Railway station in Germany

Friedrichsfeld (Niederrhein)
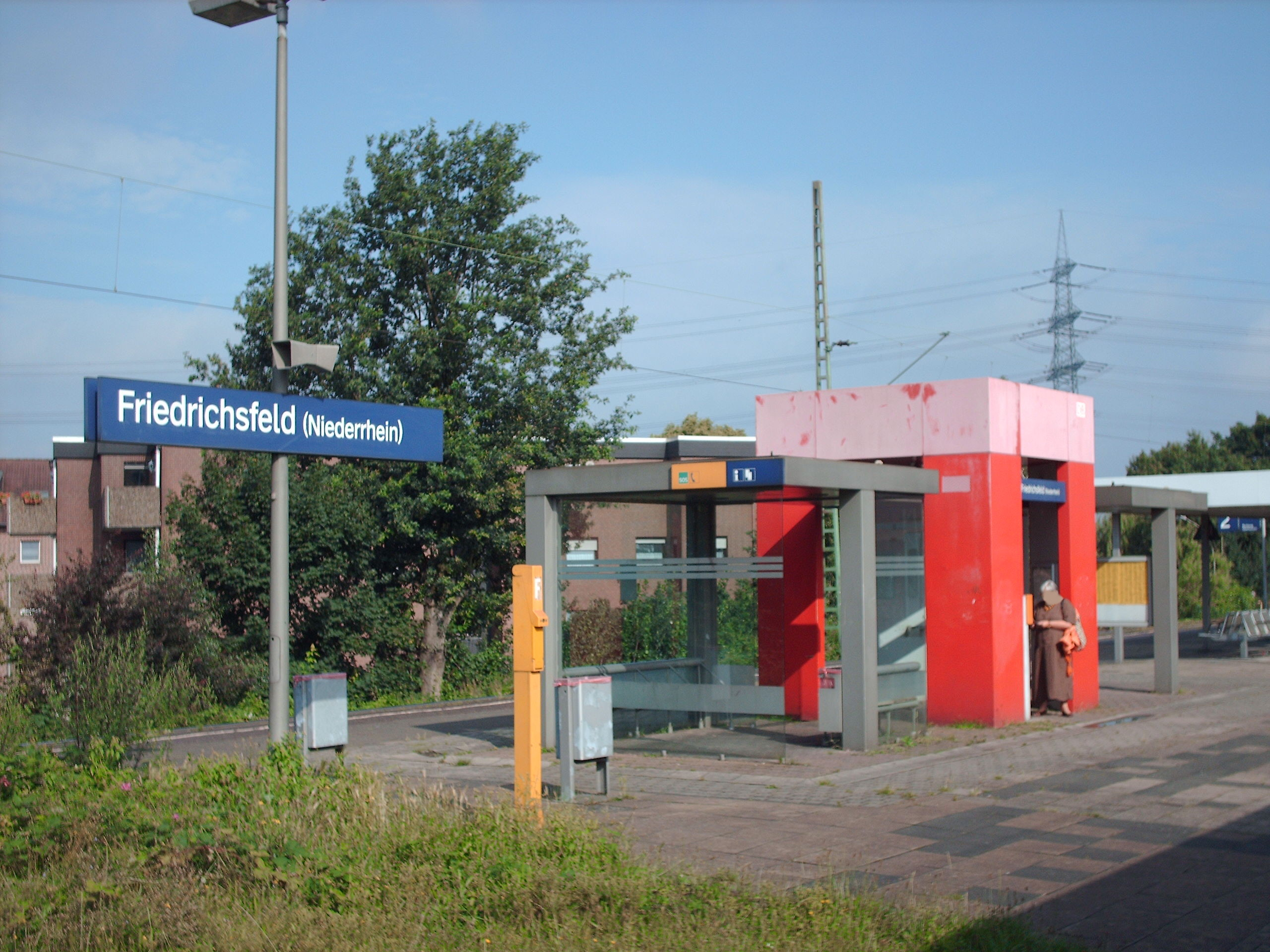

General information
- Location: Friedrichsfeld, Voerde, NRW, Germany
- Coordinates: 51°37′41″N 6°38′45″E
- Line: Arnhem-Oberhausen railway
- Platforms: 2
- Tracks: 2

Construction
- Accessible: No

Other information
- Station code: 1943
- DS100 code: EFFD
- IBNR: 8002109
- Category: 5
- Fare zone: VRR: 134
- Website: www.bahnhof.de

History
- Opened: Between 1880 and 1886

Services
Preceding station	National Express Germany	Following station
Wesel Terminus	RE 5 (Rhein-Express)	Voerde (Niederrhein) towards Koblenz Hbf
Preceding station	VIAS	Following station
Wesel towards Arnhem Centraal or Bocholt	RE 19	Voerde (Niederrhein) towards Düsseldorf Hbf
Preceding station	DB Regio NRW	Following station
Wesel Terminus	RE 49	Voerde (Niederrhein) towards Wuppertal Hbf
Location
- Location within North Rhine-Westphalia

Friedrichsfeld is a railway station in Friedrichsfeld, part of Voerde, North Rhine-Westphalia, Germany. The station is located on the Arnhem-Oberhausen railway. The train services are operated by Deutsche Bahn and Abellio Deutschland.

== History ==
The station appears to have been opened sometime between 1880 and 1886 on the Oberhausen–Arnhem line, which was opened by the Cologne-Minden Railway Company (Cöln-Mindener Eisenbahn-Gesellschaft, CME) on 20 October 1856. It was opened under the name of Friedrichsfeld, but it was renamed Friedrichsfeld (Niederrh) between 1927 and 1936.

== Transport services ==
Friedrichsfeld station is served (as of 2020) by the following lines (the Wupper-Lippe-Express operates on weekdays only):

Line	Line name	Route	Frequency
RE 5	Rhein-Express	Emmerich – Wesel – Friedrichsfeld – Duisburg – Düsseldorf – Cologne – Bonn – Remagen – Andernach – Koblenz	60 mins
RE 19	Rhein-IJssel-Express	Arnhem – Emmerich – Wesel – Friedrichsfeld – Oberhausen – Duisburg – Düsseldorf	60 mins
RE 49	Wupper-Lippe-Express	Wesel – Friedrichsfeld – Oberhausen – Mülheim – Essen – Wuppertal-Vohwinkel – Wuppertal	60 mins

=== Buses ===
It is also served by three bus routes operated by NIAG:

- 16 (Friedrichsfeld – Heidesiedlung/Oberemmelsum), 5 times a day
- 25 (Friedrichsfeld – Möllen - Dinslaken - Hiesfeld), every 60 minutes
- 81 (Wesel – Friedrichsfeld – Spellen – Löhnen – Voerde) at 30 to 60 minute intervals

It is also served by bus route 80 (to Wesel and Hünxe) operated by rvn at 60 to 120 minute intervals:

== See also ==
- List of railway stations in North Rhine-Westphalia
