= Dinslaken station =

Railway station in Dinslaken, Germany

Dinslaken
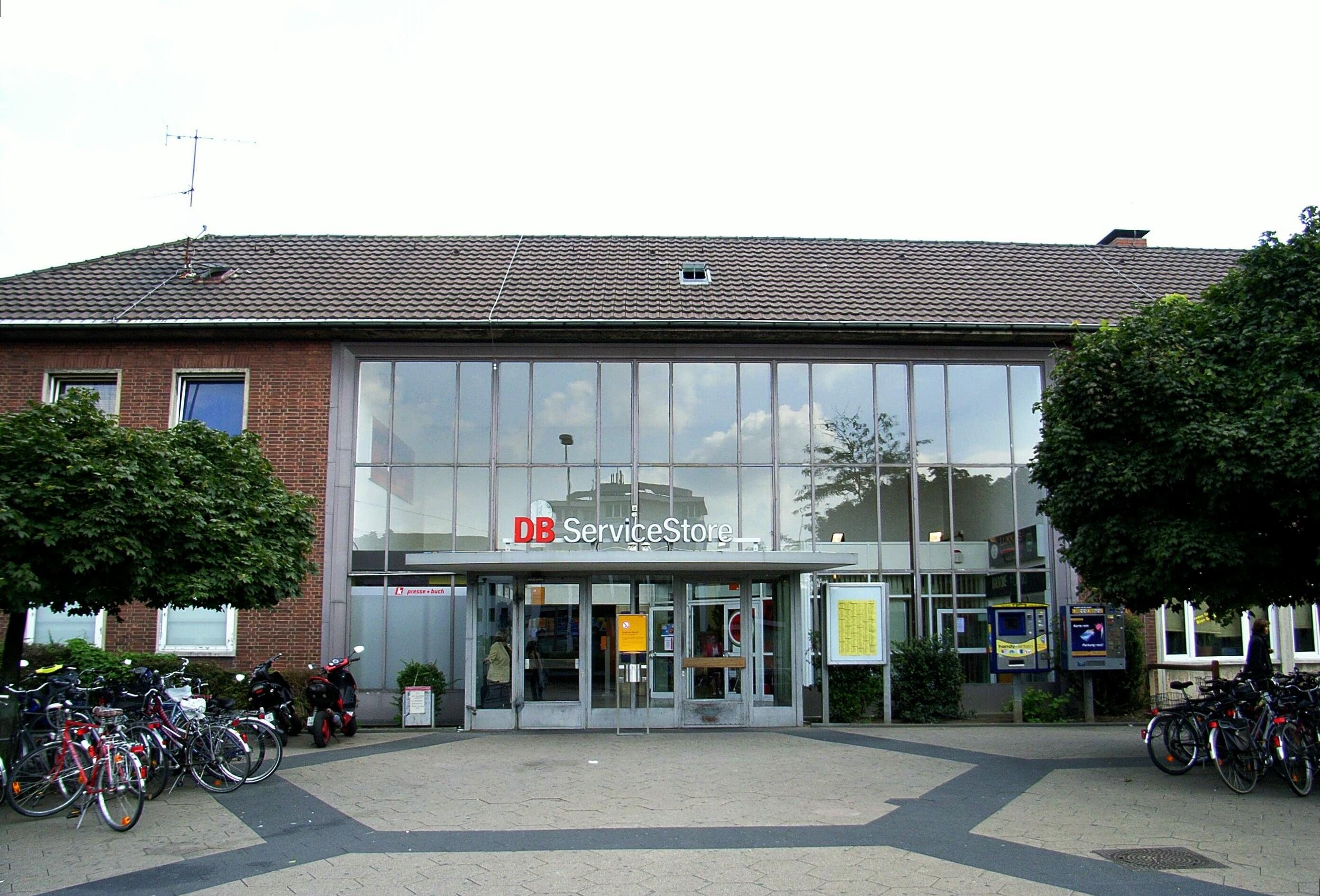

General information
- Location: Dinslaken, NRW, Germany
- Coordinates: 51°34′04″N 6°44′13″E
- Line: Arnhem-Oberhausen railway
- Platforms: 2
- Tracks: 3

Construction
- Accessible: Yes

Other information
- Station code: 1223
- DS100 code: EDIN
- IBNR: 8001469
- Category: 5
- Fare zone: VRR: 131
- Website: www.bahnhof.de

History
- Opened: 1856

Services
Preceding station	National Express Germany	Following station
Voerde (Niederrhein) towards Wesel	RE 5 (Rhein-Express)	Oberhausen-Holten towards Koblenz Hbf
Preceding station	VIAS	Following station
Voerde (Niederrhein) towards Arnhem Centraal or Bocholt	RE 19	Oberhausen-Holten towards Düsseldorf Hbf
Preceding station	DB Regio NRW	Following station
Voerde (Niederrhein) towards Wesel	RE 49	Oberhausen-Holten towards Wuppertal Hbf
Preceding station	Straßenbahn Duisburg	Following station
Neustraße towards Mannesmann Tor II	903	Terminus
Location
- Location within North Rhine-Westphalia

Dinslaken is a railway station in Dinslaken, North Rhine-Westphalia, Germany. The station is located on the Arnhem-Oberhausen railway. The train services are operated by National Express Germany and VIAS.

== Location and importance ==
The station is located at line-km 13.9 of the Oberhausen–Arnhem railway (Oberhausen Hbf–Emmerich–Arnhem). It has six mainline tracks, of which tracks 301 and 302 are the main through tracks. The station has a 325-metre-long and 76 centimetres-high island platform (tracks 301/302), while track 304 serves as a passing loop towards Emmerich. Tracks 305 to 307 are sidings. The station precincts are managed by DB Station&Service, which categorised it as a class 3 station.

The tracks have been remotely controlled from the Emmerich computer based interlocking since June 2013. The previously responsible relay interlocking "Dif" (class SpDrS60) built in 1975 was abandoned at its opening. The signal box still exists.

The station is located in the eastern part of the town centre. The shopping street in the pedestrian zone is within walking distance.

Dinslaken is only an intermediate stop on the line, but it is a major transport node. In addition to its role as a stop for trains from Oberhausen to Emmerich am Rhein, the station also serves for interchange between trains and Duisburg trams (line 903) and is therefore also important for the neighbouring city of Duisburg.

The districts in northern Duisburg such as Walsum or Fahrn have not been accessible by train since passenger services ended on the Walsum Railway. There is no rail-based local transport in northern Duisburg except for trams since the main line runs via Oberhausen. Tram line 903 thus serves the connection between Duisburg and Dinslaken and is the feeder line to regional rail transport for people in northern Duisburg. Within Duisburg, line 903 is the main line on the north–south axis of the city of Duisburg and is the most powerful line in the entire Duisburger Verkehrsgesellschaft (municipal transport company) network.

== History ==
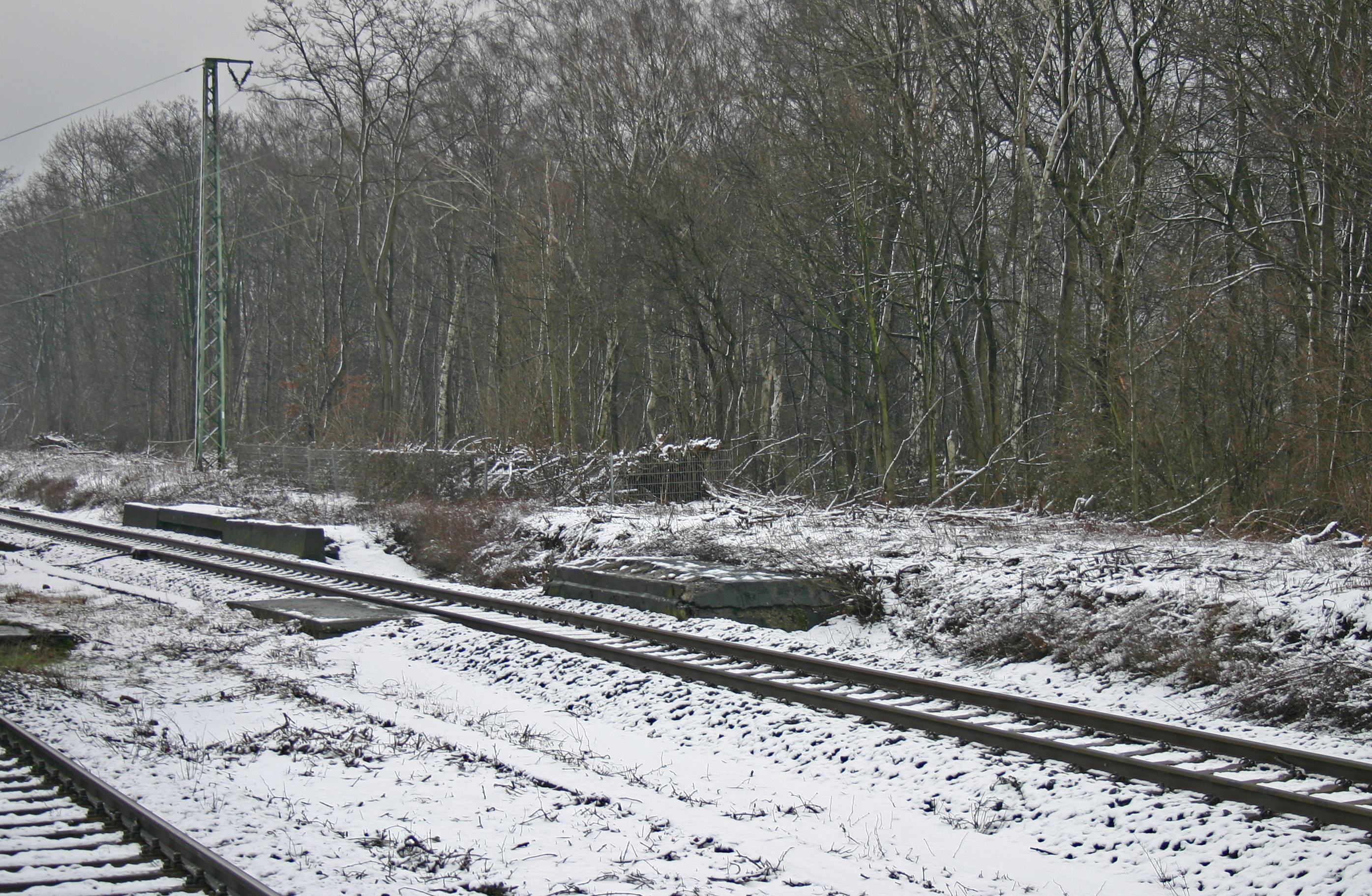
Former island platform on track 304 in 2015

The station was opened on 1 July 1856 by the Cologne-Minden Railway Company (Cöln-Mindener Eisenbahn-Gesellschaft, CME) when the first section of the Oberhausen–Arnhem line was opened to Dinslaken and it was the terminus of the line for a few months.

The section between Dinslaken and Emmerich went into operation on 20 October 1856, completing the line between Oberhausen and Arnhem. The existing post station and the daily express post service were closed after the completion of the line.

In 1916 a new entrance building was built. This was almost completely destroyed in the Second World War along with the other facilities at the station on 23 March 1945. 100 years after the opening of the first station, the current station building was opened on 10 July 1956. It is a two-story building with a flat hip roof. The counter area, which is two storeys high, is marked by a limestone framed glass facade.

The "Dif" central signal box went into operation on 30 November 1975. It replaced the old "Dib" and "Wt" mechanical signal boxes. The signal box was also responsible for the control of Voerde (Niederrhein) station.

International express trains stopped at the station until the end of the 1980s. This ended with the introduction of EuroCity services in 1987.

As part of the development of the Betuweroute, there are plans to build a second island platform with two further platform edges at the station. For this purpose, the former second island platform on track 304 will be reactivated and a track will be rebuilt to the west of it. Both platforms will also have a lift for barrier-free access.

== Transport services ==
Dinslaken station is served (as of 2020) by the following lines (the Wupper-Lippe-Express operates on weekdays only):

Line	Line name	Route	Frequency
RE 5	Rhein-Express	Emmerich – Wesel – Dinslaken – Duisburg – Düsseldorf – Cologne – Bonn – Remagen – Andernach – Koblenz	60 mins
RE 19	Rhein-IJssel-Express	Arnhem – Emmerich – Wesel – Dinslaken – Oberhausen – Duisburg – Düsseldorf	60 mins
RE 49	Wupper-Lippe-Express	Wesel – Dinslaken – Oberhausen – Mülheim – Essen – Wuppertal-Vohwinkel – Wuppertal	60 mins

=== Buses and trams ===
The station is served by several bus routes operated by Niederrheinische Verkehrsbetriebe (NIAG).

In front of the station building there is the terminal station of DVG tram line 903. Although now only double ended cars are used, the trams reverse through a loop.

== See also ==
- List of railway stations in North Rhine-Westphalia
