= Wesel station =

Railway station in Wesel, Germany

Wesel
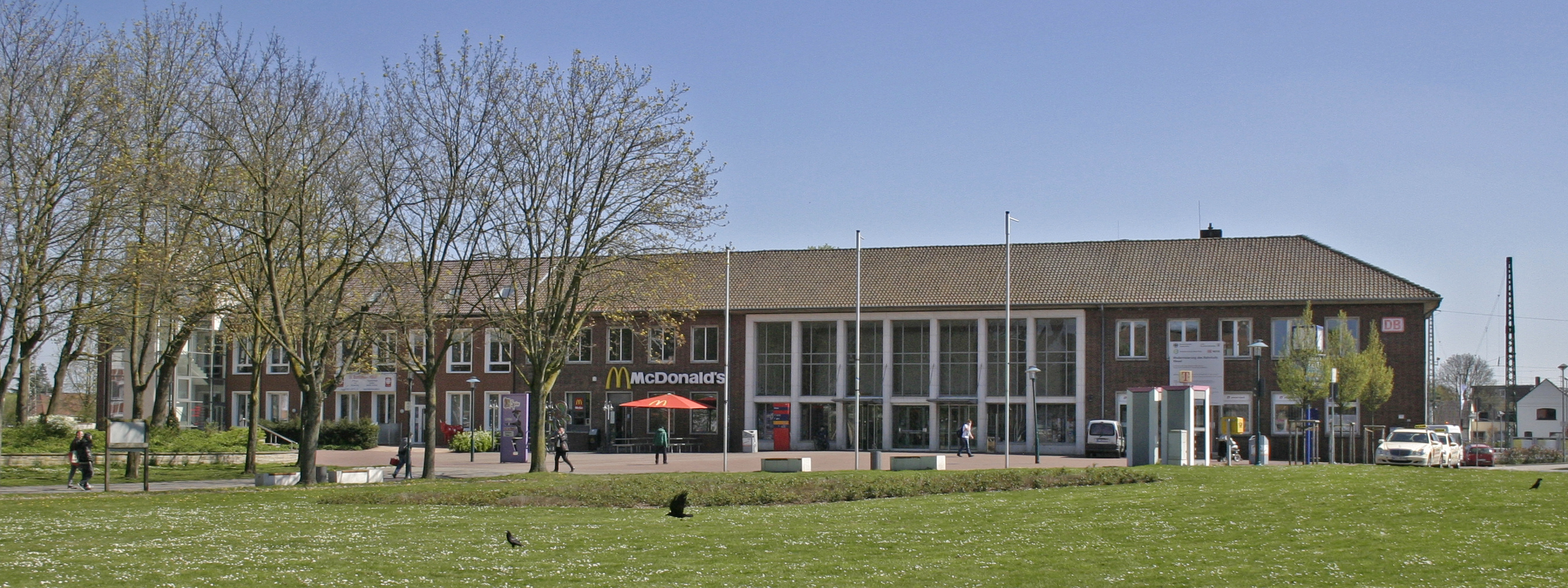
- Wesel station building from the street

General information
- Location: Wesel, North Rhine-Westphalia, Germany
- Coordinates: 51°39′21″N 6°37′38″E
- Lines: Arnhem-Oberhausen railway; Bocholt–Wesel railway
- Platforms: 4
- Tracks: 9

Construction
- Accessible: Yes

Other information
- Station code: 6701
- DS100 code: EWES
- IBNR: 8000242
- Category: 3
- Fare zone: VRR: 031
- Website: www.bahnhof.de

History
- Opened: 20 October 1856

Services
Preceding station	National Express Germany	Following station
Terminus	RE 5 (Rhein-Express)	Friedrichsfeld (Niederrhein) towards Koblenz Hbf
Preceding station	VIAS	Following station
Blumenkamp towards Bocholt	RE 19	Friedrichsfeld (Niederrhein) towards Düsseldorf Hbf
Wesel-Feldmark towards Arnhem Centraal	RE 19	Friedrichsfeld (Niederrhein) towards Düsseldorf Hbf
Preceding station	DB Regio NRW	Following station
Terminus	RE 49	Friedrichsfeld (Niederrhein) towards Wuppertal Hbf
Location
- Location within North Rhine-Westphalia

Wesel is a railway station in Wesel, North Rhine-Westphalia, Germany. The station is located on the Arnhem-Oberhausen railway and the Bocholt-Wesel railway. The train services are operated by Deutsche Bahn and Abellio Deutschland.

== History ==
As early as 1832, the Dutch Lieutenant Brade proposed the construction of a railway on the west bank of the Rhine from Amsterdam to Cologne. After preparatory work in the Netherlands had been largely completed, Brade began the first surveys in Prussia. He sought support from the Mayor of Wesel, who initially opposed the project. The town was more interested in expanding traffic on the Rhine and the Lippe. The town's view only changed after the opening of the first railway lines in Germany.

A railway committee was founded in Wesel under the leadership of Ludwig Bischoff, the headmaster of the Wesel high school, on 2 March 1841. During the preliminary considerations for the construction of the Cologne–Minden railway, the committee proposed a line through Wesel, Münster and Bielefeld to Minden. Bischoff referred in a memorandum to the advantages of this route, which could in the long term link the fortress city of Wesel with the Westphalian provincial capital of Münster and the Prussian capital of Berlin, and suggested that it would support the movement towards German national unity. In addition, the northern route was the shortest connection from Berlin to the Rhine and was favourable for railway building. The head of the Cologne-Minden Railway Committee, David Hansemann, rejected the initiative on the grounds that the line chosen should be the shortest route, especially since the connection between Berlin and the fortified city of Cologne was more important

After Hansemann's rejection, the Wesel Committee concentrated increasingly on a link between Cologne and Amsterdam, which would connect the Ruhr with the North Sea. The town of Emmerich, which was also seeking a connection at the time, received approval by cabinet order on 15 September 1845 for preparatory work for the construction of a branch line from Oberhausen on the Cologne-Minden Railway via Wesel and Emmerich with a connection to the Amsterdam–Arnhem railway, which was opened between 1843 and 1845. The Wesel and Emmerich Committee merged into a joint committee based in Wesel on 22 January 1846. After the March Revolution in 1848, Ludwig Bischoff had to resign from the school and leave the town of Wesel and the committee due to his liberal views.

In 1850, the town again contacted the Prussian Ministry of Commerce to promote the construction of the line. The town emphasised its loyalty to the king and the House of Hohenzollern and referred to its importance as the most northwestern bulwark in Prussia. To compensate for the obstacles associated with the law governing its fortress status, the town sought financial support for the line's construction and equal treatment with other unprofitable lines. As an alternative to the state assuming all construction costs, Wesel proposed state participation in the capital raising for the construction and a declaration that it would guarantee interest at the rate of three and a half percent. The town continued to seek support from some senior military personnel; as early as 1843, the Prussian Ministry of War had endorsed a rail connection to Wesel. In November 1850, the Prussian Minister of Commerce August von der Heydt instructed Wesel to stop promoting the scheme and indicated that the current situation made it impossible to issue an interest guarantee. This reflected ongoing negotiations between Prussia and the Netherlands.

After the Netherlands agreed to change the line from Amsterdam to Arnhem from (1,945 mm (6 ft 4 9/16 in)) to (1,435 mm (4 ft 8 1/2 in) standard gauge), nothing stood in the way of the project. On 1 October 1853, the Cologne-Minden Railway Company (Cöln-Mindener Eisenbahn-Gesellschaft, CME) received the concession for the Oberhausen–Arnhem route. Planning in the Wesel area had begun on the basis of various preliminary contracts as early as 1852.

=== Construction and commissioning of the Oberhausen–Arnhem railway ===
The construction of Wesel station was subjected to special conditions due to its proximity to the fortress. The Ministry of War initially wanted a station on the western side. This would have required the building of a 200 Prussian rod (≈ 753 metre)-long embankment to protect against flooding and ice on the Lippe. In addition, the Rheintor (Rhine Gate), which formed the entrance to the pontoon bridge over the Rhine, would no longer have been usable by horse-riders and wagons. In this case, the railway would have built an opening bridge for the railway. In addition, the station could have been fired on from the other bank of the Rhine. A station on the eastern side, on the other hand, satisfied the town and the CME and was ultimately built due to the problems with the western option. The CME intended to build the railway embankment to be flood-proof at 35 Prussian feet (≈ 11.0 metres) above the level of Wesel. The military administration required a reduction in the overall height to 30 feet (≈ 9.4 m), and later to 28.5 feet (≈ 8.9 m).

The Ministry of War permitted the station to be built within the fortress area so that it would not be too far away from the town. Since buildings this close to the walls could have offered protection for attackers, the station buildings had to be single-storey and made of wood. In addition, they had to be able to be dismantled within a day. The construction also resulted in demands from the military to expand the fortifications substantially. To protect the existing fortress, the Ministry of War called for the construction of Fort Fusternberg on the land between the station and the Lippe (at a cost of 185,000 thalers). The ministry also required the construction of a tower fort with extended walls on the town side of Fort Fusternberg (135,000 thalers) that would defend the Lippe crossing if Fort Fusternberg fell. Lunette 23 would have to be raised because of the railway embankment (1500 thalers). In addition, the construction of a horse-hauled railway including protective works from the station to the port was required in order to bring operating materials to safety in the fortress in the event of war (28,500 thalers). The CME rejected the additional costs of 350,000 thalers and declared itself ready to build a bulwark on the strong point of Flamer Schanze on the other side of the Lippe. The CME was ready to build the military railway, but was against the construction of the defensive structures. The company pointed out that the railway embankment would be demolished without compensation in the event of war and therefore could not bear the additional costs. In addition, the advantages of railway construction would be greater than the disadvantages for the fortress system. Since the Prussian Minister of War, Friedrich Graf von Waldersee, was not ready to agree, but the commitments made to the Netherlands in relation to the construction of the railway could not be postponed, the matter was referred to the Prussian King Frederick William IV. On 10 April 1856 the CME agreed to pay half of the cost of 174,250 thalers, while the other half was to be paid from the railway fund. The king approved the project on 14 April 1856.

The whole line became usable with the commissioning of the Dinslaken–Wesel–Emmerich section on 20 October 1856. The CME had held opening ceremonies over several days from 17 October 1856, including, among other things, a special trip from Deutz to Amsterdam and back. While the outward journey between Ruhrort and Emmerich used water transport on the Rhine with a stop in Wesel, a train was taken for the return journey. No fixed program was originally planned in Wesel. Because the steam locomotive had to replenish its water supplies in Wesel, the people of Wesel decided to take advantage of this ten-minute break; the festival committee was informed of the project and made no objection. The mayor asked all the town councilors to gather on the platform in festive clothes when the train arrived at 12:30 p.m. and a music corps would also line up. In addition, the project was promoted in the town, so that the citizens would be present in large numbers. The project was implemented as planned.

In the beginning, the station had a separate office building for the stationmaster in addition to the entrance building. An open loading ramp and loading road bordered the large goods shed. A two-track engine shed was available for the locomotives of the trains terminating in Wesel. Next to it was the water station; two water cranes were installed over an 1120 cubic Prussian feet (≈ 34.6 cubic metre) storage container. An average of 19 officials and workers were employed at the station in 1858. The station precincts contained track with a length of 650 rods (≈ 2.27 km) and 16 sets of points. There were already 22 sets of points and 715 rods (≈ 2,69 km) of track in 1862. 25 sets of points were installed in 1868 and 26 sets of points in 1870. The number of employees temporarily dropped to 13, after the completion of the remaining work, then rose continuously to 28 in 1870. The CME established a tree nursery on some land that could not be sold in order to demarcate the railway area.

Wesel station's freight traffic fell short of expectations in the early days, despite good traffic on the line. 101,375 outgoing passengers were counted at the station in 1858, which was similar to traffic at Essen and Hamm. Military tickets accounted for almost ten percent of passengers. The volume of freight traffic was significantly lower, with around 50 incoming and outgoing freight wagons per day. Due to the fortress ring, the establishment of factories within the town was technically impossible. Buildings outside the city walls were prohibited. The situation only changed gradually after the town was demilitarised in the early 1890s. Another disadvantage, which resulted from the fortress, was the route between town and the station. The entrance from Berliner Tor was angled and covered with gravel and coarse sand. Despite regular cleaning, the street was covered with horse manure and furrowed by wagon wheels. There was no paved sidewalk or railings to fence off the moats. Since the street was not illuminated until the beginning of the 1860s, serious injuries and fatalities occurred after falls, especially at night or in thick fog. The military railway to the port went into operation on 3 July 1865. The CME had delayed its construction because it feared that it would lose goods traffic to the shipping industry.

The first major renovation took place in 1870. The freight shed was expanded from 1059 square feet (≈ 104.3 square metres) to 5666 square feet (≈ 558.1 square metres) and the loading ramps for military traffic were extended. With the outbreak of the Franco-Prussian War on 24 July 1870, freight traffic was discontinued and passenger traffic was reduced from 18 trains to one pair per day. The mobilisation lasted until 14 August 1870 and the peacetime timetable was restored from 21 September 1870.

=== Construction of the Haltern–Venlo railway and expansion of the railway facilities ===
The first proposals for the construction of a Paris-Hamburg Railway were put forward by the French company, Etudes et Travaux de Chemins de Fer, which was backed by the French Rothschild Bank. In 1862, the company received permission to carry out preparatory work in Prussia. The Kingdom of Prussia, however, did not want a foreign railway company to operate the railway and transferred the project to the CME. The condition for the granting of an overall license was the construction of a fixed crossing of the Rhine near Wesel, since the fortress would be able to prevent its use in the event of war. The increasing tensions between Prussia and the French Empire, culminating in the Franco-Prussian War in 1870, led to the withdrawal of the Rothschild banking house from the project. For the CME, the eastern section of the railway, which would connect Hamburg with the Ruhr, was of greater importance. The company therefore always tried to delay the construction of the Haltern–Venlo line, which was not expected to be profitable, or to alter it to pass over a Rhine bridge near Ruhrort, which was rejected. Only when the Noord-Brabantsch-Duitsche Spoorweg-Maatschappij (North Brabantsch-German Railway Company; NBDS) agreed to run its trains to Wesel, was the CME ready to carry out its construction. The bridge was eventually built downstream from the town.

Wesel station was adapted for the integration of the Haltern–Venlo line and the sidings were lengthened. At the same time, it was decided to ensure that the radius of the two curves, which the Haltern–Venlo railway would follow in front of and behind Wesel station, would not to be too tight. Otherwise, two more bridges over the Lippe would have had to be built for a wider southern curve. A two-level interchange station was also categorically rejected by the fortress command because of its elevated location. This resulted in two tight curves with a radius of 200 Prussian rods (≈ 753 metres) towards Haltern and 120 rods (≈ 452 m) towards Venlo. The line ended in platform track 3, which was equipped with an island platform. The reconstruction dragged on until 1875. After the work was completed, the number of tracks had risen to 24. The track length increased by 7550 metres and 35 single sets of points, two three-way sets of points and four double crossing sets of points were installed. The CME had two sets of sidings facing the north and the south for shunting movements. The Haltern–Wesel section was opened on 1 March 1874 and the Wesel–Venlo section was put into operation on New Year's Eve 1874.

The CME had contractually guaranteed the NBDS, which shared the section over the Rhine bridge with the CME, the construction of a platform, a bypass track and a siding to the north of the existing entrance building. As the CME had also received the concession for the Bocholt–Wesel railway, it built another platform track. The two platform tracks and the bypass track built in between ended at a turntable near the entrance building. The sidings were further north. The track length was increased by a further 550 metres and two sets of points were also installed. In preparation for the construction of the tracks, the CME had previously moved all storage areas and two military ramps to the east side, where a goods shed was later built. The siding from the port railway remained on the west side as the only freight track. The (Wesel –) Gest (Büderich) – Goch line of the NBDS and the Wesel–Bocholt line were opened on 1 July 1878. After the commissioning the Winterswijk–Bocholt railway by the Nederlandsch-Westfaalsche Spoorweg-Maatschappij (Dutch-Westphalian Railway Company) in 1880, Wesel had direct connections from the Netherlands in four directions.

It quickly became apparent that the station was not able to cope with the increased traffic despite the expansion. It turned out to be a problem that trains of the Venlo Railway in each direction could not be processed at the same time, and that the two main tracks to/from Oberhausen had to be blocked so that passengers could cross the tracks to the platforms. The curve towards Haltern was only usable at low speed. The entrance building no longer coped with traffic after the extra lines were commissioned. Immediately after the nationalisation of the CME in 1880, the newly founded Königliche Eisenbahn-Direktion (Royal Railway Directorate, KED) of Cologne of the Prussian state railways (Preußische Staatseisenbahnen), which was responsible for railway facilities on the east (right) bank of the Rhine, started to renovate them. In order to separate the traffic of the two main lines, it moved the Venlo Railway facilities to the west side of the entrance building, which used up the last remaining space between the station and the fortifications. The Haltern curve was slightly reduced by widening of the platform. However, the Venlo Railway and the Oberhausen line intersected with different curve radii, each lying in the inner curve, which meant that the points could only be used at reduced speed. The entrance building was replaced by a larger building in the same place and as a result of the renovation it was now on an island between tracks and was accessible via a level crossing. The other high-rise structures such as the water tower, storerooms and workshops were also renovated during the renovation in the early 1880s. The first signal boxes were put into operation from 1881. The section between Sterkrade and Wesel was duplicated by 1886. The Venlo Railway between Wesel and Büderich was duplicated by 1899. The State railways replaced the old engine shed by a permanent eight-track roundhouse from 1895 to 1898.

By the turn of the century, the station building had an overall roof. The additional platform tracks on the Oberhausen and Venlo lines were equipped with platform canopies around 1904. A separate station section had to be built south of the level crossing for the Oberhausen–Walsum–Wesel line (Walsumbahn) which opened on 15 October 1912, since there was no space in the station itself to accommodate additional passenger trains. The part of the station called Hamborner Bahnhof (referring to Hamborn on the Oberhausen–Walsum–Wesel line) had a platform track with a platform and a bypass track. It also had a small entrance building. Direct operations were also possible for freight trains using a set of points.

=== Second World War and loss of significance ===
A direct connecting curve was opened from Haltern towards Oberhausen bypassing Wesel station in about 1943. In the Allied bombing of Wesel during the final phase of the Second World War the station was hardly affected in contrast to the town. On the morning of 10 March 1945, Wehrmacht forces blew up the Rhine bridge when retreating to the eastern side of the Rhine. The bridges over the Wesel–Datteln Canal and the Lippe were also blown up in the same month. The station building survived the war virtually unscathed, although it burned briefly. It was reopened in November 1945.

Temporary bridges were used on the line to Oberhausen until 1946 and the trains to the north terminated in Emmerich until 1949, when the section to the border near Elten was restored to operation. The first civilian passenger trains started running towards Haltern in May or June 1945. American pioneers built a makeshift bridge between Büderich and Wesel to transport supplies in spring 1945. The rail bridge was south of the old Rhine bridge and crossed the Rhine near the site of the Rheinbaben bridge (1917–1945). It met the Venlo Railway near Fort Fusternberg. The bridge and the curve built during the war were dismantled in the autumn of 1946. Nevertheless, the connections over the old Rhine bridge to Büderich and towards Walsum were not restored after the end of the war.

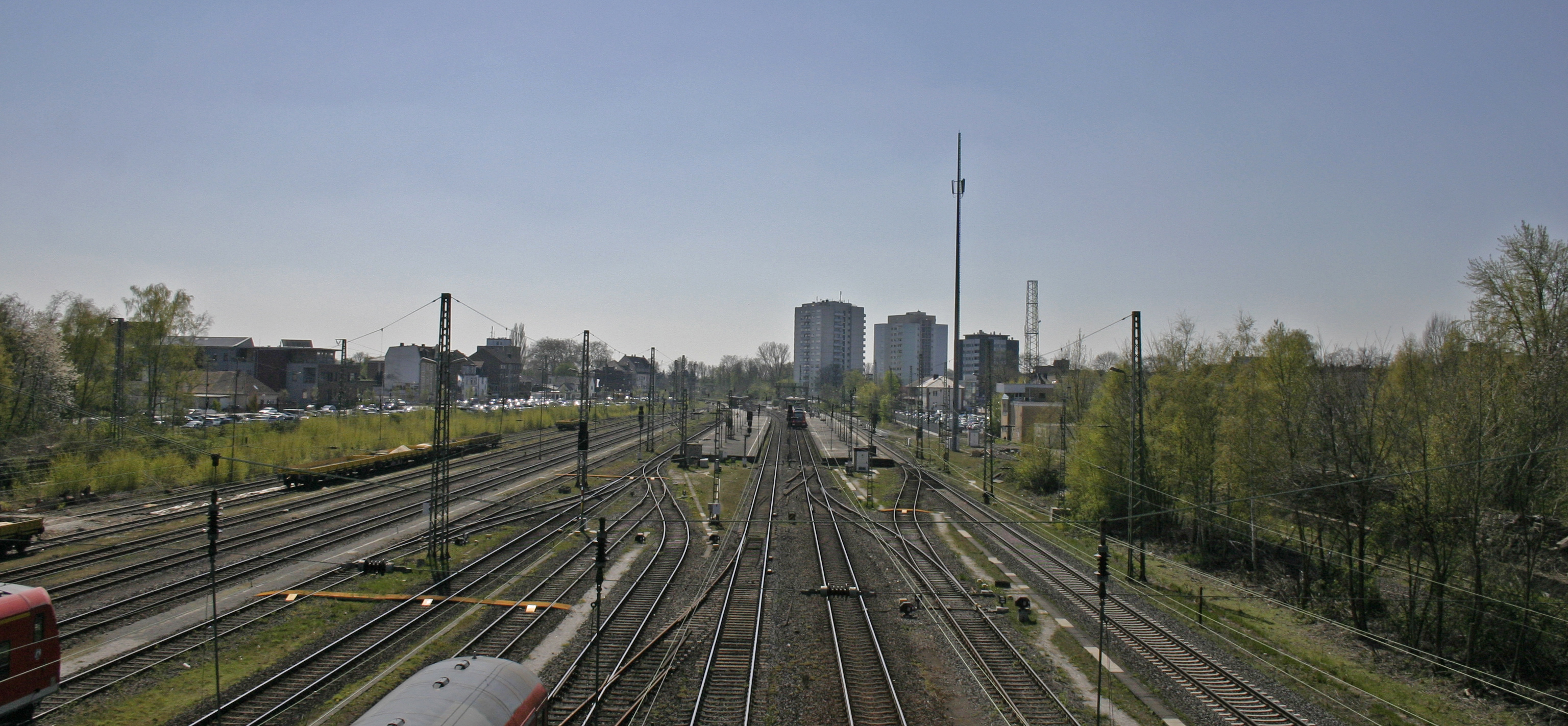
Wesel station in 2015

About 500 railway workers were employed at Wesel station in 1950. These were spread across the various departments of the station, including passenger and freight operations, infrastructure maintenance and rolling stock maintenance. At that time, the station was still classified as class I. Already in 1948 the former Reichsbahndirektion (railway directorate) of Essen had the second track on the Venlo Railway towards Haltern converted into a siding to Obrighoven. Five years later, sidings to businesses were connected directly to the main track and the connecting siding was dismantled. At the same time, the line was downgraded to a branch line. Deutsche Bundesbahn abandoned passenger services to Haltern on 30 September 1962 and freight traffic was abandoned on 26 May 1974. The track was retained as a siding to serve the Obrighoven substation. To speed up the traffic on the line to the Netherlands, Deutsche Bundesbahn had the through main tracks on this line relocated in the early 1960s. They now ran through the middle of the old island platform, so that after the reconstruction, there were two island platforms with four platform edges (tracks 2–5). The platforms were connected to the entrance building via a pedestrian tunnel. The speed for through trains increased to 110 km/h. The junction with the Venlo Railway was finally abolished in the absence of a bridge over the Rhine since 1945. The line towards Haltern was connected to the freight tracks on the east side, the number of which was reduced during the reconstruction. As a result of the reconstruction, the bay platform tracks and the turntable north of the island platform were also eliminated; the remaining trains to and from Bocholt subsequently reversed at platform 5. The level crossing at the entrance to the station building surrounded by tracks was replaced in 1961 by an overpass further north. In 1966, the mechanical and electromechanical signal boxes were replaced by signal box "Wf", which contained a track plan push button control panel for a relay interlocking.

The Bundesbahndirektion (Deutsche Bundesbahn Railway Directorate, BD) of Essen dissolved the Wesel operations office on 1 April 1954 and its tasks were taken over by the Oberhausen 2 operations office. The rolling stock depot closed with the electrification of the line to the Netherlands on 22 May 1966. In its last years, it had only served local passenger and freight traffic, while international trains were covered from Oberhausen or Emmerich. The infrastructure maintenance office (Bahnmeisterei, "Bm") took over the tasks of the similar offices in Bocholt, Emmerich and Dinslaken in the 1960s and 1970s and was absorbed by Bm Oberhausen in the 1980s. The Wesel freight handling office (Güterabfertigung, Ga), took over the tasks of the freight offices at Friedrichsfeld, Hamminkeln, Empel-Rees and Bocholt between 1961 and 1979, after BD Essen dissolved them as independent offices. In 1990, BD Essen combined the station and goods handling into one office. In the same year, Deutsche Bundesbahn abandoned the carriage of express parcels, which since the dismantling of the railway tracks to the west had to be handled on the passenger platforms. One year after the German railway reform (Bahnreform), goods handling closed on 31 December 1994. Deutsche Bundesbahn subsequently dismantled the sidings east of platform 9; this site has since been redeveloped.

=== Wesel station since the German rail reform ===
After the railway reform, the railway closed various facilities in the entrance building, which was exposed to vandalism. By the early 21st century the situation had so escalated that Deutsche Bahn launched its Sauberkeitskampagne NRW (NRW cleanliness campaign) in Wesel and the outsides of the building were cleaned up at a cost of DM 20,000. One year after this campaign, the lessee of the restaurant and the hotel surrendered his lease. After negotiations between the city of Wesel and Deutsche Bahn, further construction work was carried out in 2007. The pedestrian tunnel was extended to the east and a commuter parking area was established. The existing commuter parking lot on the west side was enlarged. At the same time, the town received barrier-free access to the platforms with the installation of ramps and lifts. In the middle of the construction work, Deutsche Bahn issued its preliminary plans for the expansion of the Oberhausen–Emmerich line as part of the Trans-European Networks Rotterdam–Genoa corridor. Initially, the construction of a third track between Wesel and Oberhausen on the east side was planned, but a short time later it became known that this would go all the way to Zevenaar in the Netherlands. The construction of a fourth track between Wesel and Oberhausen was also considered. This was to go into operation on the west side and thus occupy the space of a previously built pedestrian ramp. After another change of plan, the construction of the fourth track was reduced to the Oberhausen–Dinslaken section, but the track layout was changed so that the construction of a through track between the platforms and the entrance building was still planned. The construction of a new pedestrian ramp is therefore still necessary. The construction of noise barriers is also planned.

In August 2014, work began on raising and modernising the two platforms. The work stalled for several months after the construction company went bankrupt. It was completed at the end of 2017 except for some finishing work.

== Entrance building ==
The first entrance building was a single-storey timber-frame structure with a floor area of 4319 square Prussian feet (≈ 425.4 square metres). It was therefore very different from the other stations on the route. The building included a vestibule, a waiting room for 1st and 2nd class passengers and another for 3rd and 4th class passengers. In the middle there was a ticket office and a baggage check-in counter, with service rooms behind. The telegraph office was expanded for the construction of Haltern–Venlo railway. A station restaurant was established in the waiting rooms, probably at the beginning of the 1870s.

The second entrance building was built at the location of the first building, but as a two-storey building. As a result of the reconstruction of the station, it was now on an "island" surrounded by tracks. Since the Rayonbestimmungen ("radius regulations", which limited the type of buildings that could be built outside fortresses to avoid them providing cover for attackers) continued to apply, this building was also made of timber. The inside and outside layers of the walls consisted of planks that were sealed with earthen plaster. The cavity between the two layers were not filled in, which would have slowed the building's possible demolition during a war. The building was connected to the sewage system from the start. The external appearance of the building was enhanced by extensive woodwork. In the following years, a surrounding platform canopy was attached to the building. After the abolition of the remaining radius regulations after the First World War, a basement was built under part of the building.

The "Hamborn" platform of the Oberhausen–Walsum–Wesel line (Walsumbahn) built to the south of the south end of the main station was given a separate entrance building with an attached porch. It was built on a brick foundation in timber construction and, like the main entrance building, had double-layered walls. Inside, the surfaces were nailed with tubular fabric to which plaster and lime mortar were applied. The lower wall surfaces in the waiting and service rooms, up to 1.5 metres above the floor, were given a coating of planed board instead of plaster. The unobstructed height of the service rooms and the 3rd/4th class waiting room was four metres and that of the 1st/2nd class waiting room and the lobby was 2.65 metres. The wooden beams in the vestibule were given a horizontal ceiling made of planed boards. The interior was warmed by heaters. The roof was made of boards covered with bituminous waterproofing. As the wooden structures did not provide the minimum clearances as a result of the limits set by the regulations, a special permit was required. It was issued on the basis that the station would soon be upgraded; the entrance building was in use until the Second World War.

Despite the heavy Allied air raids on Wesel, the main entrance building survived the Second World War almost unscathed. The building burned down on 25 November 1945, shortly before the renovation of the station master's apartment was completed. A temporary structure was quickly built on the station forecourt as a replacement. This contained a ticket office and a station restaurant. After the new entrance building was put into operation, the temporary building served as an apprentice workshop for Deutsche Bundesbahn and was demolished in 1963.

The plans for a new building were drawn up in 1953. The current entrance building was opened on 8 July 1955. It was built to plans by Erich Eickemeyer. Its design is based on the entrance buildings of Borken (Westf) and Emmerich, but it was larger with an 80-metre-wide front. The town initially wanted a tower-like roof structure that was not realised. However, the size of the structure was increased by building a small hotel with ten beds. On the ground floor, next to the ticket office, there was a bookshop, a 3rd class waiting room and a station restaurant with a dining room, which also functions as a 1st/2nd class waiting room. The 3rd class waiting room was turned into a pub in 1972 and the station bookshop was enlarged in 1982. In the basement of the restaurant there was also a nine-pin bowling alley. Part of the premises was disused by 2002.

== Transport services ==
All long-distance services currently pass Wesel without stopping. The nearest stops for long-distance services are in Arnhem or Oberhausen.

=== Regional services ===
Wesel station is served (as of 2020) by the following lines (the Wupper-Lippe-Express operates on weekdays only):

Line	Line name	Route		Frequency
RE 5	Rhein-Express	Emmerich – Wesel – Duisburg – Düsseldorf – Cologne – Bonn – Remagen – Andernach – Koblenz		60 mins
RE 19	Rhein-IJssel-Express	Arnhem – Emmerich –	Wesel – Oberhausen – Duisburg – Düsseldorf (split/joined in Wesel)	60 mins
RE 19	Rhein-IJssel-Express	Bocholt – Dingden – Hamminkeln – Blumenkamp –	Wesel – Oberhausen – Duisburg – Düsseldorf (split/joined in Wesel)	60 mins
RE 49	Wupper-Lippe-Express	Wesel – Oberhausen – Mülheim – Essen – Wuppertal-Vohwinkel – Wuppertal		60 mins

=== Buses ===
It is also served by several regional and local bus routes operated by NIAG, RVN, and Rheinlandbus:

- SB3 (Wesel Bf – Drevenack – Krudenburg – Hünxe – Dinslaken-Lohberg – Dinslaken Bf)
- SB6 (Wesel Bf - Ginderich - Xanten)
- SB7 (Wesel Bf – Wesel-Büderich – Alpen Bf – Issum – Geldern Bf)
- SB21 (Wesel Bf – Drevenack – Krudenburg – Schermbeck)
- 37 (Wesel Bf – Wesel-Büderich – Alpen Bf – Bönninghardt – Sonsbeck – Kevelaer)
- 63 (Wesel Bf – Wesel-Feldmark, Marktplatz – Wesel-Flüren – Diersfordt – Hamminkeln-Mehrhoog – Mehrhoog Bf (– Hamminkeln Weststraße – Hamminkeln-Unterbauernschaft, Hasenheim) – Rees-Haldern Bf – Rees-Empel Bf)
- 64 (Wesel Bf - Blumenkamp - Hamminkeln - Dingden – Bocholt Bf – Bocholt, Bustreff)
- 66 (school bus: Wesel Bf – Wesel-Büderich – Ginderich – Xanten Krankenhaus – Xanten Bf)
- 67 (Wesel Bf – Wesel-Büderich – Alpen Bf – Issum – Geldern Bf)
- 68 (Wesel Bf – Wesel-Büderich – Rheinberg-Wallach – Rheinberg-Ossenberg – Rheinberg Rathaus – Rheinberg-Winterswick – Moers-Utfort – Moers, Königlicher Hof – Moers Bf)
- 72 (Wesel Bf - Hamminkeln - Raesfeld)
- 80 (Wesel Post – Wesel Bf – Friedrichsfeld Bf – Hünxe Gewerbepark – Bucholtwelmen – Hünxe Busbahnhof)
- 81 (Wesel Martinistraße – Wesel Bf – Friedrichsfeld Bf – Voerde-Spellen – Voerde-Mehrum – Voerde-Löhnen – Voerde, Rathausplatz)
- 82 (Wesel Martinistraße – Wesel Bf – Wesel-Schepersfeld – Wesel, Im Buttendicksfeld)
- 83 (Wesel-Lackhausen, Konrad-Duden-Straße – Stoppenbergstraße/Bf Feldmark – Wesel Martinistraße – Wesel Bf – Wesel-Fusternberg – Wesel, Im Buttendicksfeld)
- 85 (Wesel-Flüren, Waldstraße – Wesel-Feldmark, Marktplatz – Wesel Bf – Wesel-Schepersfeld-Nord – Obrighoven, Rosenstraße – Wesel, Im Buttendicksfeld)
- 86 (Rees Schulzentrum – Bergswick – Mehrbruch – Mehrhoog Bf – Bislich – Wesel-Flüren, Waldstraße – Wesel-Feldmark, Marktplatz – Wesel Bf – Wesel-Schepersfeld-Nord – Obrighoven, Voßhöveler Straße – Wesel, Im Buttendicksfeld)
- 96 (Wesel Bf – Wesel-Feldmark, Marktplatz – Wesel-Blumenkamp – Hamminkeln, Markt (– Brünen, Verbandsparkasse) – Hamminkeln Weststraße – Loikum – Wertherbruch, Kirche)

== Gallery ==
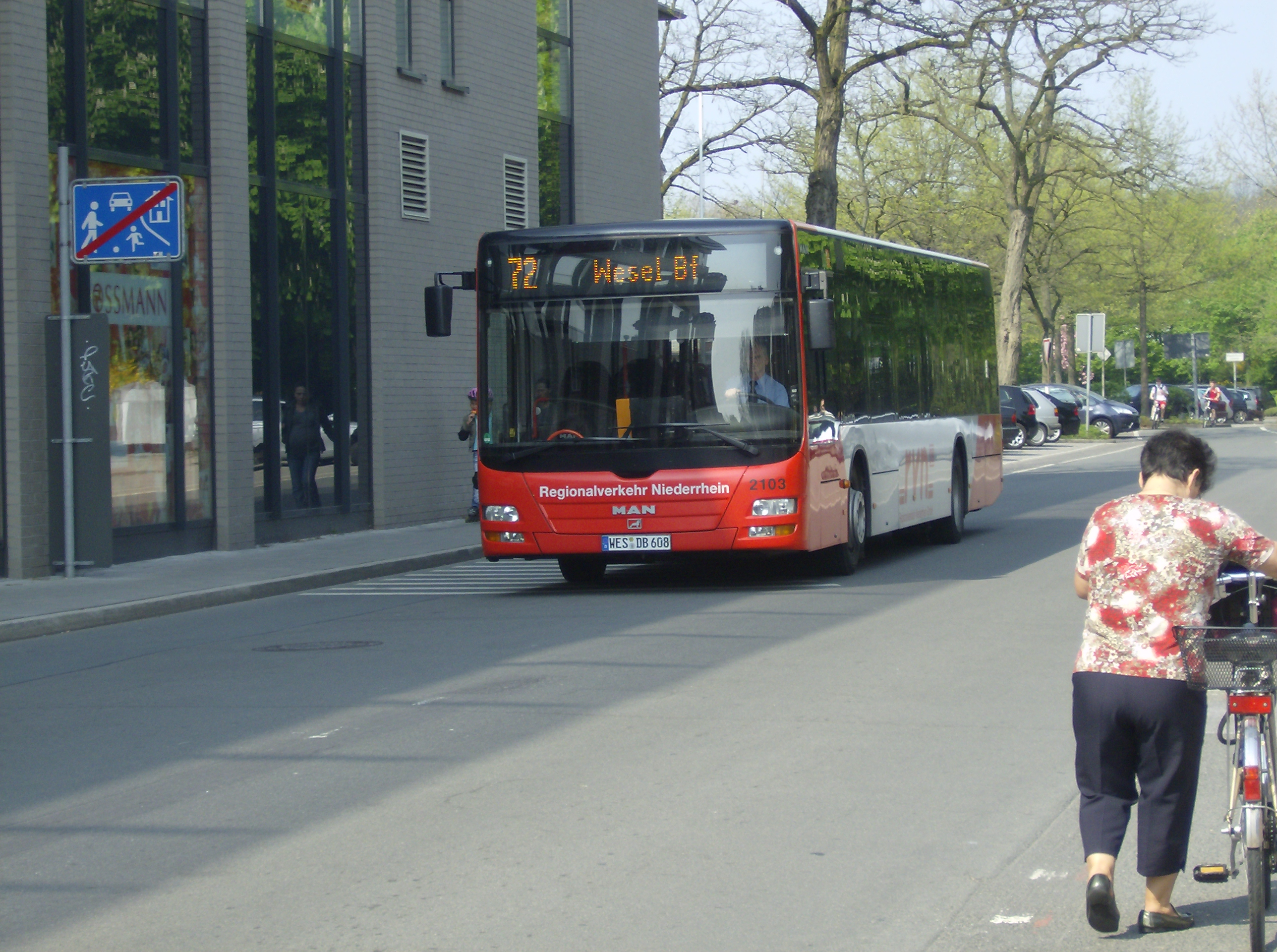
A Bus heading through Wesel heading for the station

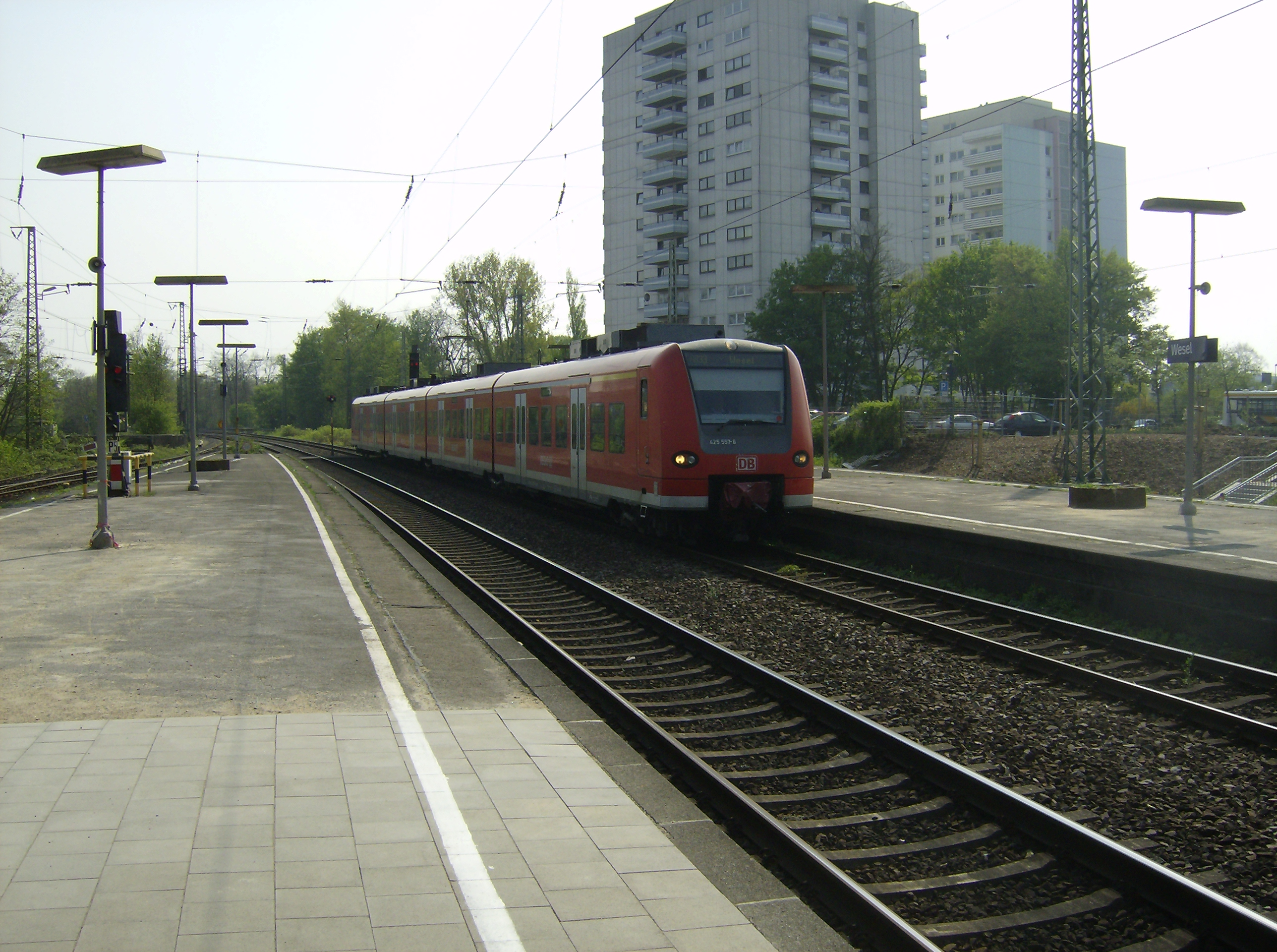
A Class 425 arrives at Wesel on RB33

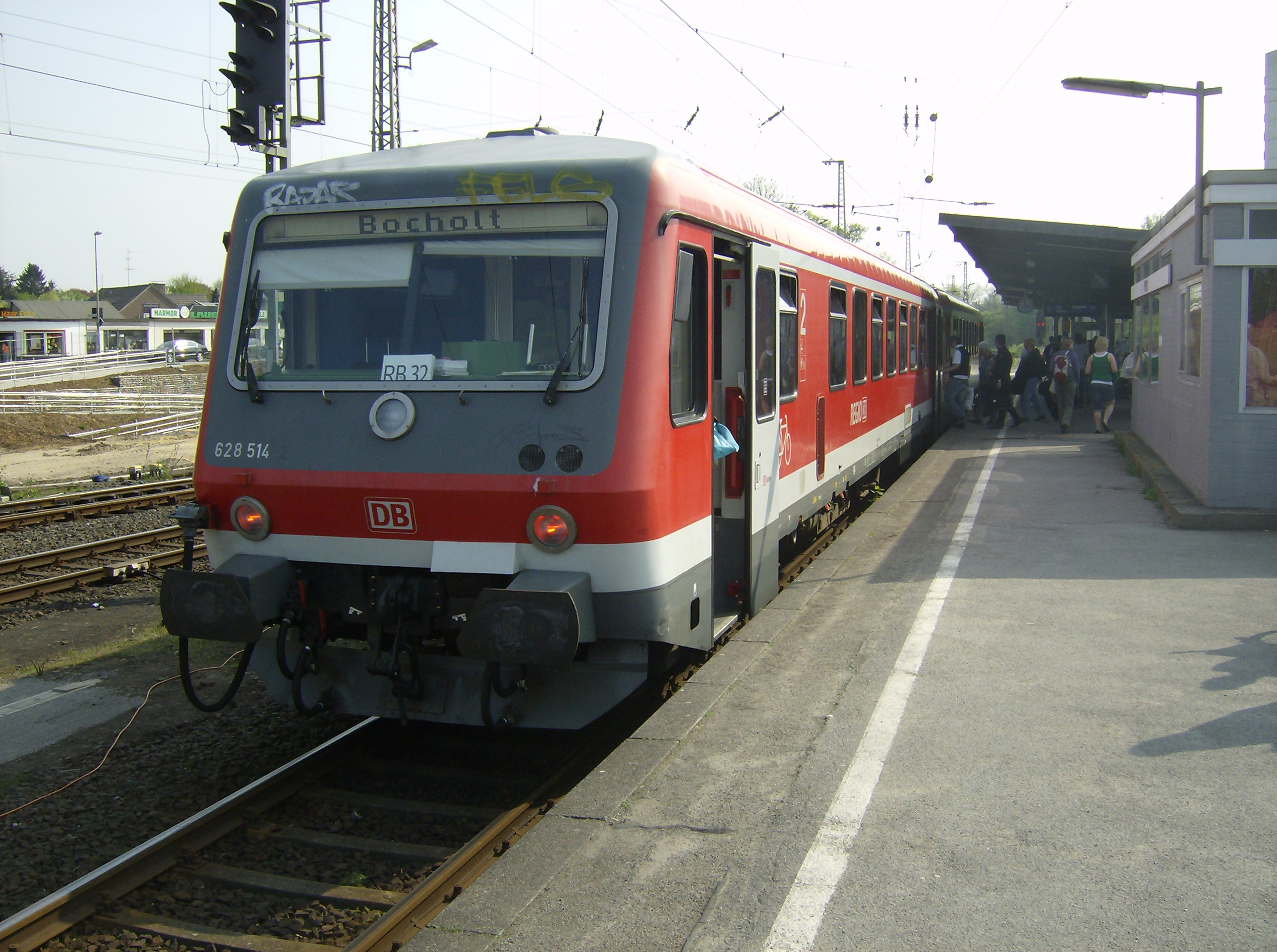
Class 628 on the service to Bocholt

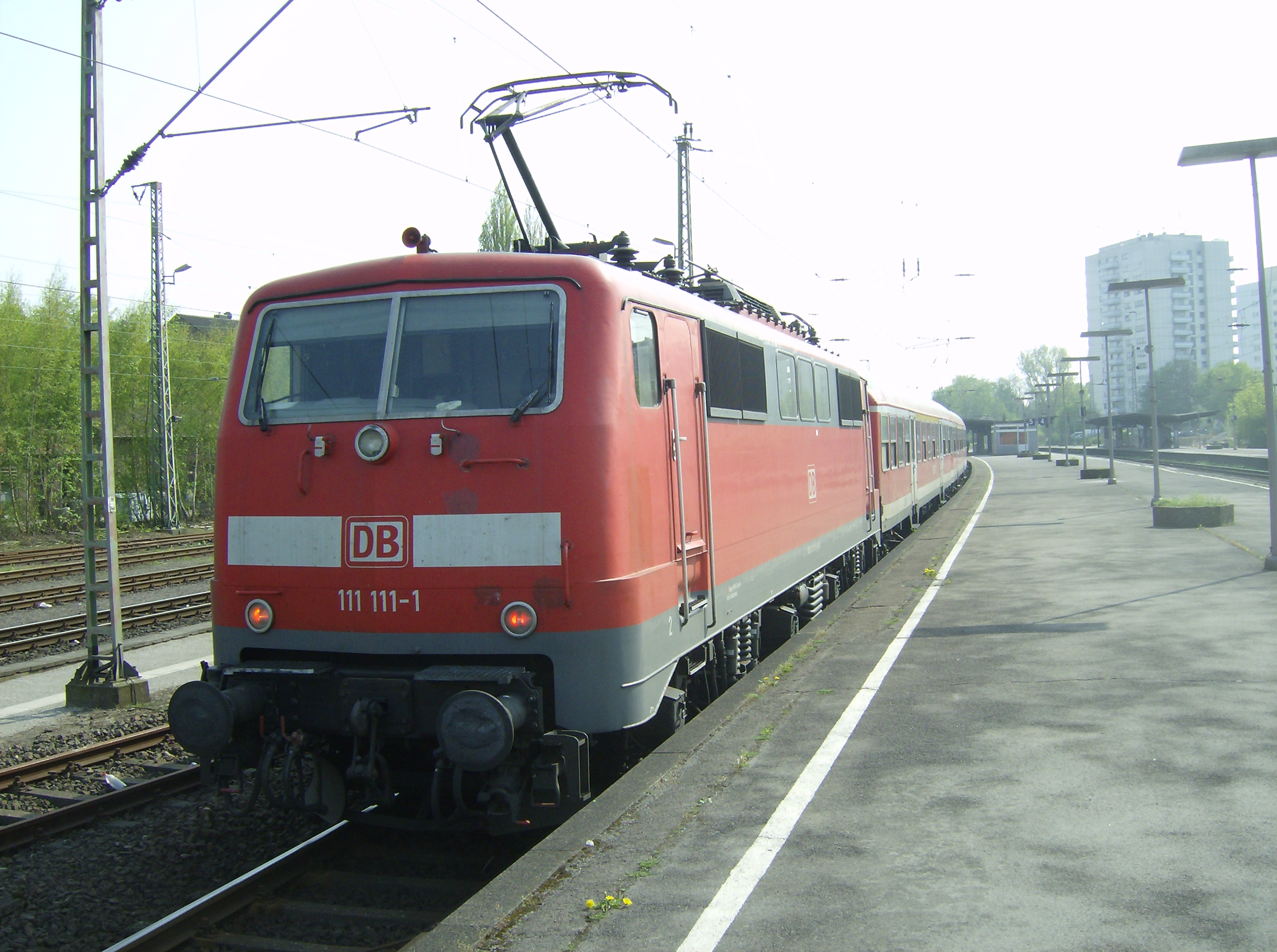
Class 111 on the service to Mönchengladbach

== See also ==
- List of railway stations in North Rhine-Westphalia
