= Andernach station =

Railway station in Germany

Andernach
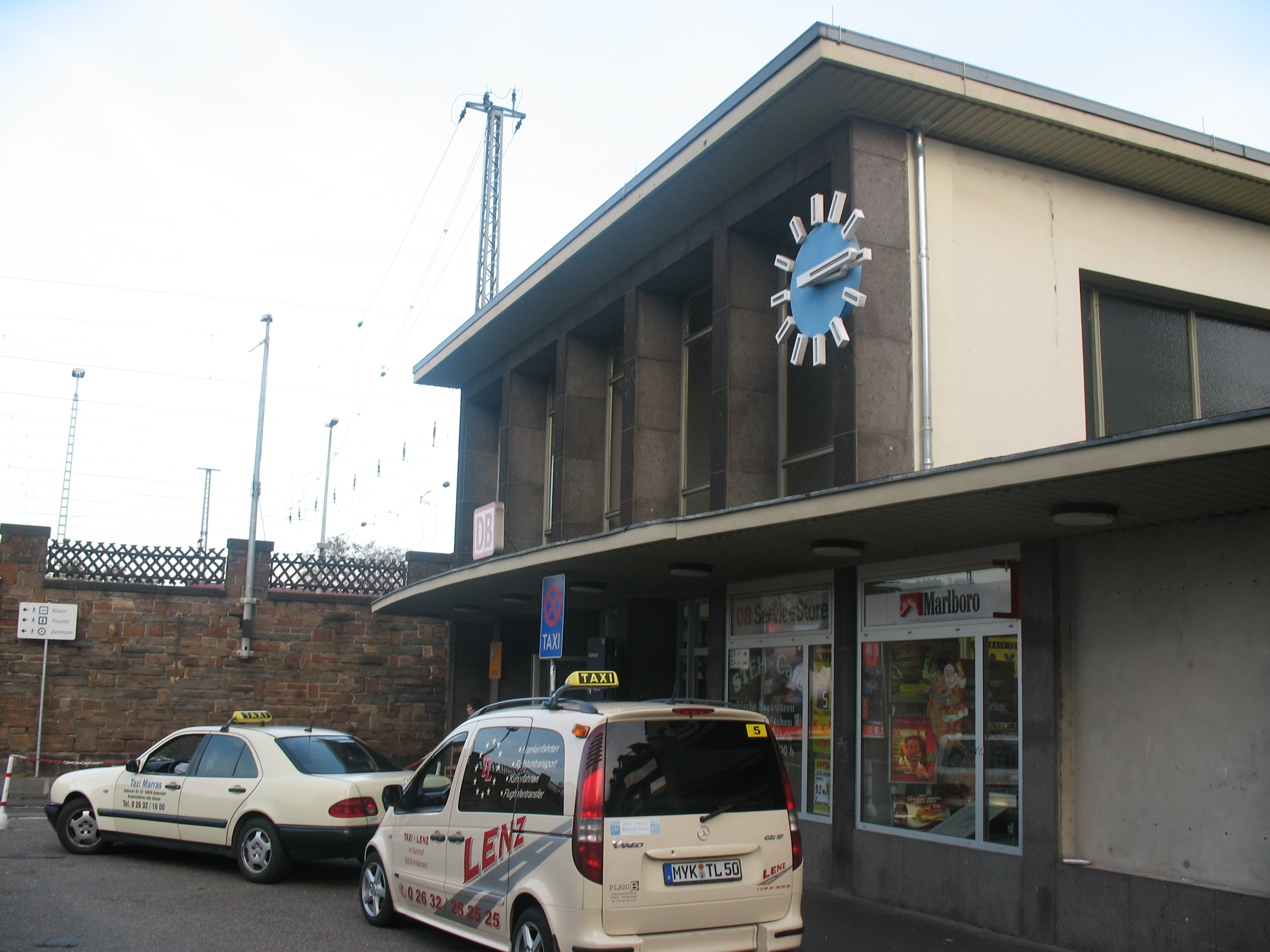
- Station and forecourt

General information
- Location: Andernach, North Rhine-Westphalia; Germany
- Coordinates: 50°26′08″N 7°24′12″E
- Lines: West Rhine Railway (KBS 470); Cross Eifel Railway (KBS 478)
- Platforms: 4

Construction
- Accessible: Yes

Other information
- Station code: 144
- DS100 code: KAND
- IBNR: 8000331
- Category: 3
- Fare zone: VRM: 306
- Website: www.bahnhof.de

History
- Opened: about 1858
Services
| Preceding station | DB Fernverkehr | Following station |
|---|---|---|
| Remagen towards Emden Außenhafen or Norddeich Mole | IC 35 | Koblenz Hbf towards Koblenz Hbf or Konstanz |
| Remagen towards Düsseldorf Hbf | IC 37 | Koblenz Hbf towards Luxemburg|Luxemburg |
| Remagen towards Hamburg-Altona | ICE 42 | Koblenz Hbf towards Frankfurt (Main) Hbf |
| Preceding station | DB Regio Mitte | Following station |
| Miesenheim towards Mayen Ost | RB 23 | Weißenthurm towards Limburg (Lahn) |
| Miesenheim towards Kaisersesch | RB 38 | Terminus |
| Preceding station | National Express Germany | Following station |
| Bad Breisig towards Wesel | RE 5 (Rhein-Express) | Koblenz Stadtmitte towards Koblenz Hbf |
| Preceding station | Trans Regio | Following station |
| Namedy towards Köln Messe/Deutz | RB 26 | Weißenthurm towards Mainz Hbf |
Location

Andernach station is the transportation hub of the city of Andernach in the German state of Rhineland-Palatinate. It is a mid-sized station with thousands of passengers each day. It is currently classified by Deutsche Bahn as a category 3 station. It has four passenger platforms (tracks 1, 2, 3 and 24), three with a length of more than 280 m, and sidings and freight tracks. It is on the Left Rhine line (German: Linke Rheinstrecke) and is the terminus of the Cross Eifel Railway (Eifelquerbahn). In addition to passenger operations, the station has container and freight operations to the east of the station, particularly serving the tin plate manufacturer, Rasselstein.

In the station forecourt, there is a bus station, served by all city buses and regional bus services to Mayen, Neuwied and Ochtendung. The regional bus service to Maria Laach stops 50 metres from the bus station.

== History ==
Andernach received a rail extension of the Rhenish Railway Company’s Left Rhine line from Oberwinter to Weißenthurm on 15 August 1858. On 11 November 1858 the first train ran on the Left Rhine line to Koblenz. A year later, the line was extended to Bingerbrück.

The Eifelquer line from Andernach to Niedermendig was opened for freight on 1 April 1878 and for passengers on 15 May. This line was also owned by the Rhenish Railway Company. On 20 September 1879, the 2.33 km long freight line to Rheinwerft was opened.

All regional and some express trains stopped in Andernach, while most higher-quality passenger trains went by without stopping.

During the Second World War, Andernach station was completely destroyed. It was rebuilt after the war.

The station was extensively modernised between 2010 and 2023. The height of the central platform was raised for its entire length to 76 centimetres, the platform roof was modernised, provided with barrier-free access using lifts, the environment was improved, including the bus station, bike-and-ride and park-and-ride facilities were installed, and new access was provides to the main platform.

Deutsche Bahn sold the station building to a private investor in 2019.

== Services ==
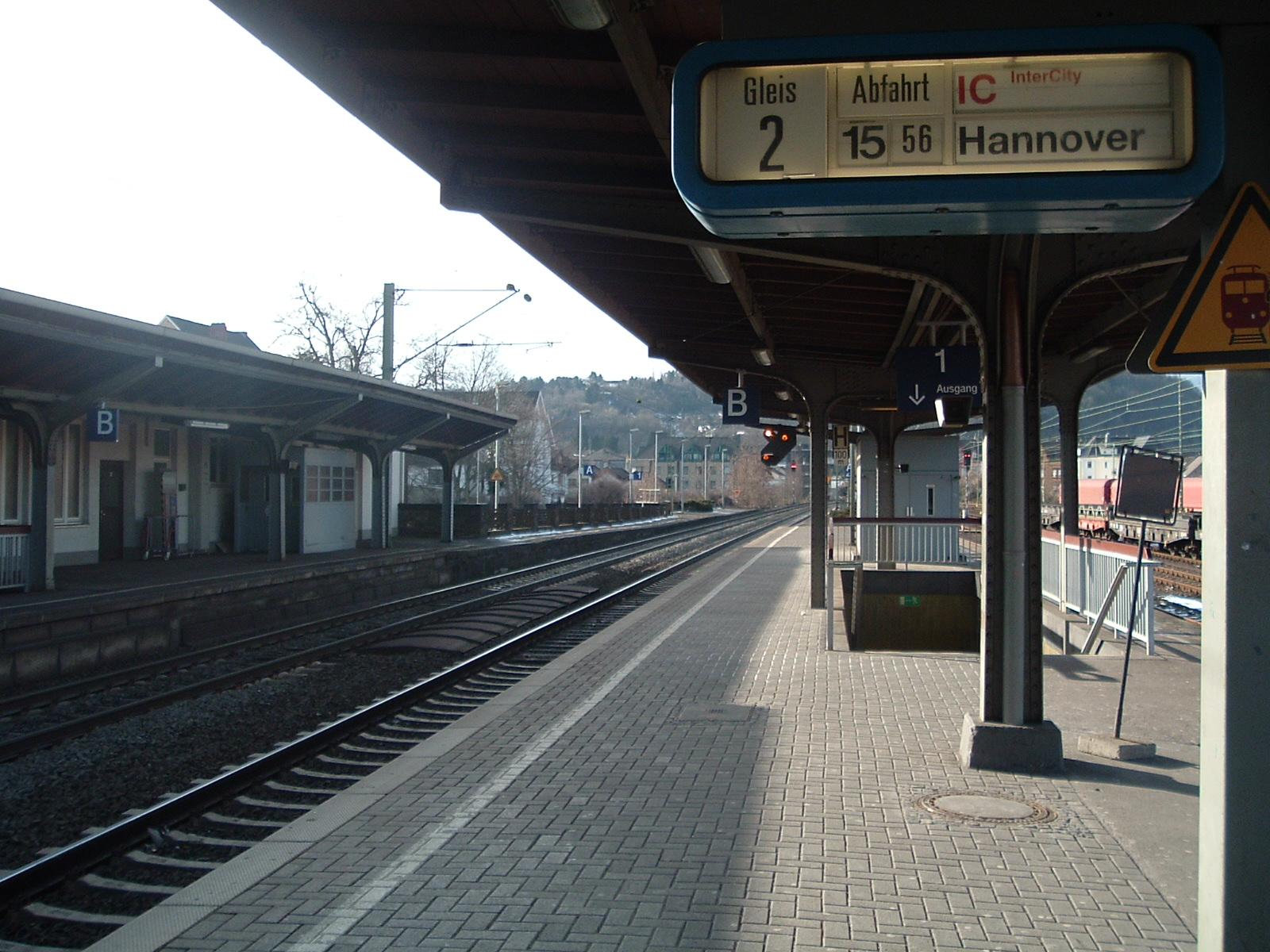
Track 2 with old split-flap display

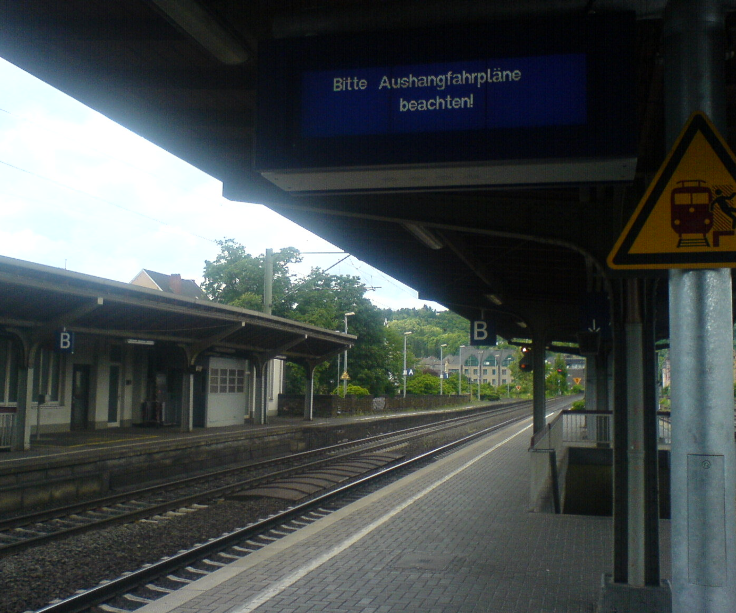
Track 2 with new LCD

The only facility available at the station is a Deutsche Bahn (DB) ticket office, which has two counters. The former station restaurant is used as a hackerspace, the former station bookstore is now a kiosk. The former taxi base is empty. There is also an ATM and seating. There is a park and ride parking lot for public transport users at Andernach station.

== Passenger operations ==
Trains stop on four platforms at Andernach station. Long-distance services stopping at the station consist of Intercity-Express and Intercity trains. Regional services consist of Regional-Express (RE) and Regionalbahn (RB) trains to cities within 200 kilometres, running towards Cologne/Emmerich, Koblenz, Mainz and Mayen/Kaisersesch. In the 2026 timetable, the following services stop at the station:

=== Long distance ===
| Line | Route | Frequency |
|---|---|---|
| IC 35 | (Norddeich Mole – Emden) or (Bremerhaven-Lehe – Bremerhaven – Bremen – Osnabrück –) Münster – Recklinghausen – Wanne-Eickel – Gelsenkirchen – Oberhausen – Duisburg – Düsseldorf – Cologne – Bonn – Remagen – Andernach – Koblenz – Mainz – Mannheim – Karlsruhe – Baden-Baden – Offenburg – Donaueschingen – Singen – Konstanz | Some trains on the weekend |
| IC 37 | Düsseldorf – Cologne – Bonn – Remagen – Andernach – Koblenz – Cochem – Bullay – Wittlich – Trier – Wasserbillig – Luxembourg | 1 train pair |
| ICE 42 | Hamburg-Altona – Hamburg – Bremen – Osnabrück – Münster – Dortmund – Wuppertal – Solingen – Cologne – Bonn – Andernach – Koblenz – Frankfurt Airport – Frankfurt | 1 train pair |

=== Regional services ===
| Line | Route | Frequency |
|---|---|---|
| RE 5 Rhein-Express | Wesel – Oberhausen – Duisburg – Düsseldorf – Cologne – Bonn – Remagen – Andernach – Koblenz-Stadtmitte – Koblenz Hbf | 60 min |
| RB 23; Lahn-Eifel-Bahn | Limburg (Lahn) – Bad Ems – Koblenz Hbf – Koblenz Stadtmitte – Andernach – Mendig – Mayen | 60 min |
| RB 26; MittelRheinBahn | Cologne – Bonn – Remagen – Andernach – Koblenz-Stadtmitte – Koblenz Hbf – Boppard – Oberwesel – Bingen – Ingelheim – Mainz | 60 min |
| RB 38; Lahn-Eifel-Bahn | Andernach – Mendig – Mayen – Kaisersesch | 60 min |

=== Other stations in Andernach ===
The town of Andernach has other stations in two suburbs:

- Namedy on the Left Rhine line and served by MRB (Mittelrheinbahn) 26 trains
- Miesenheim on the Eifelquer Railway and served by RB 92 trains.
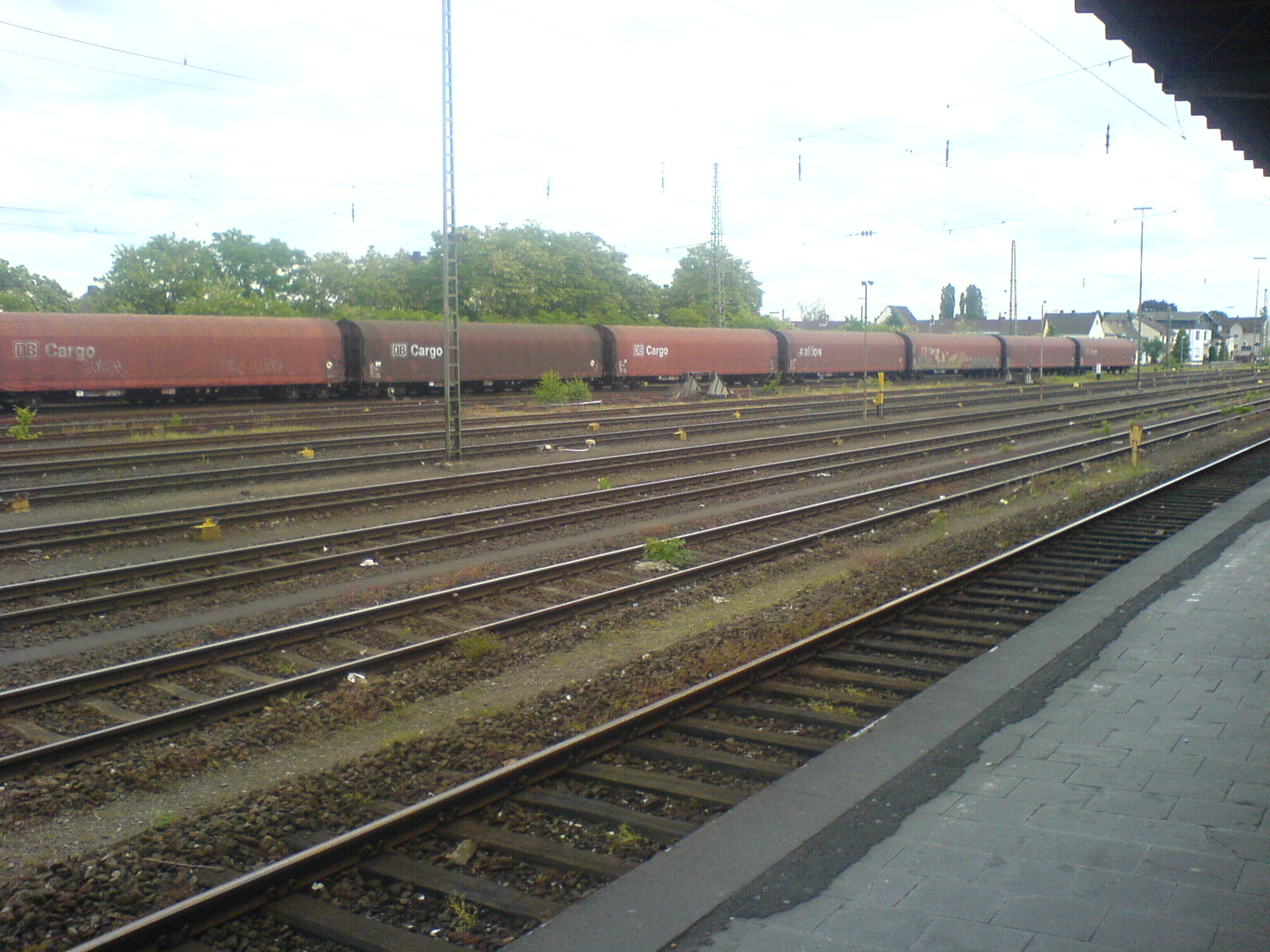
Andernach freight tracks

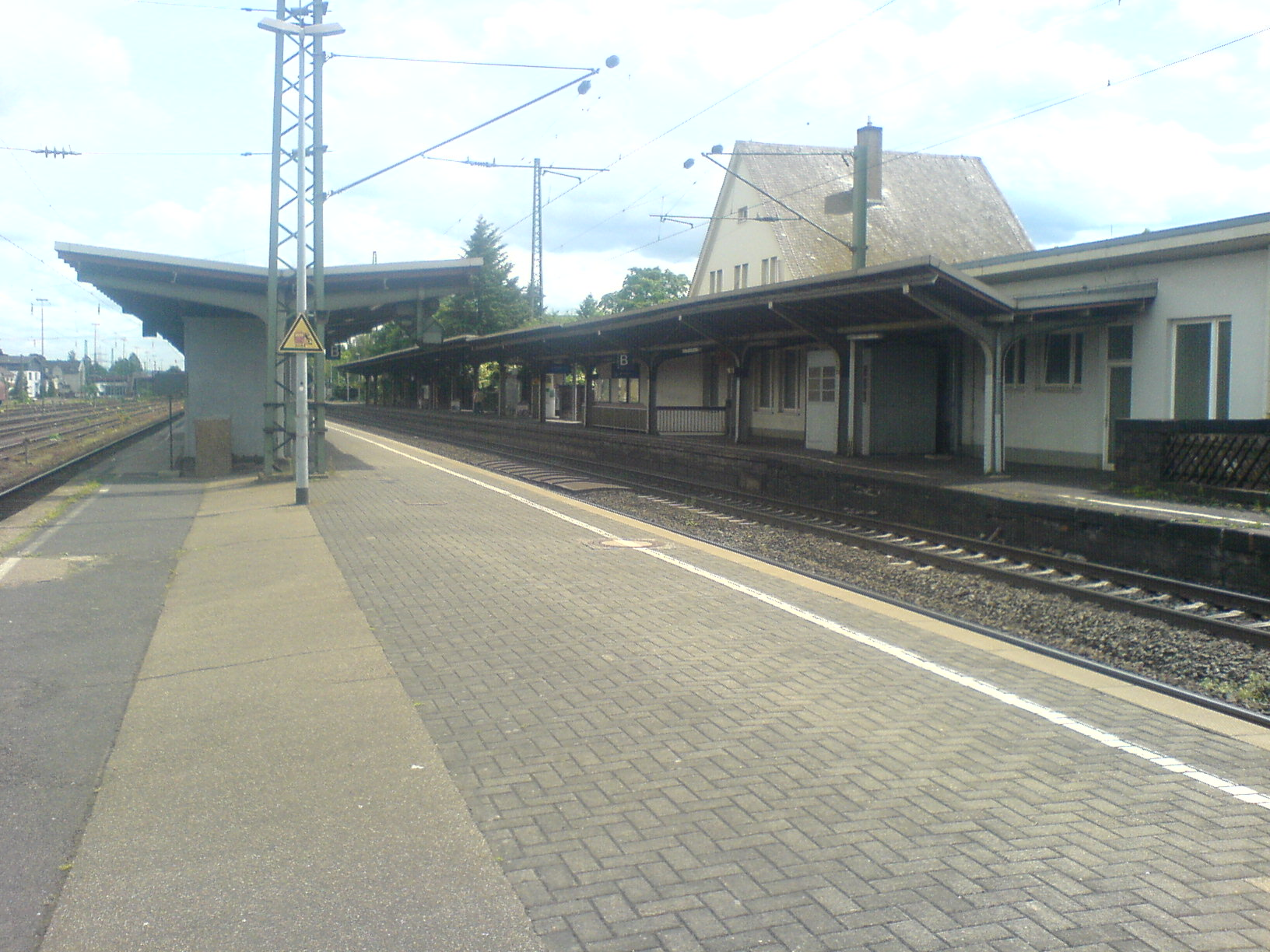
Tracks 1 and 2

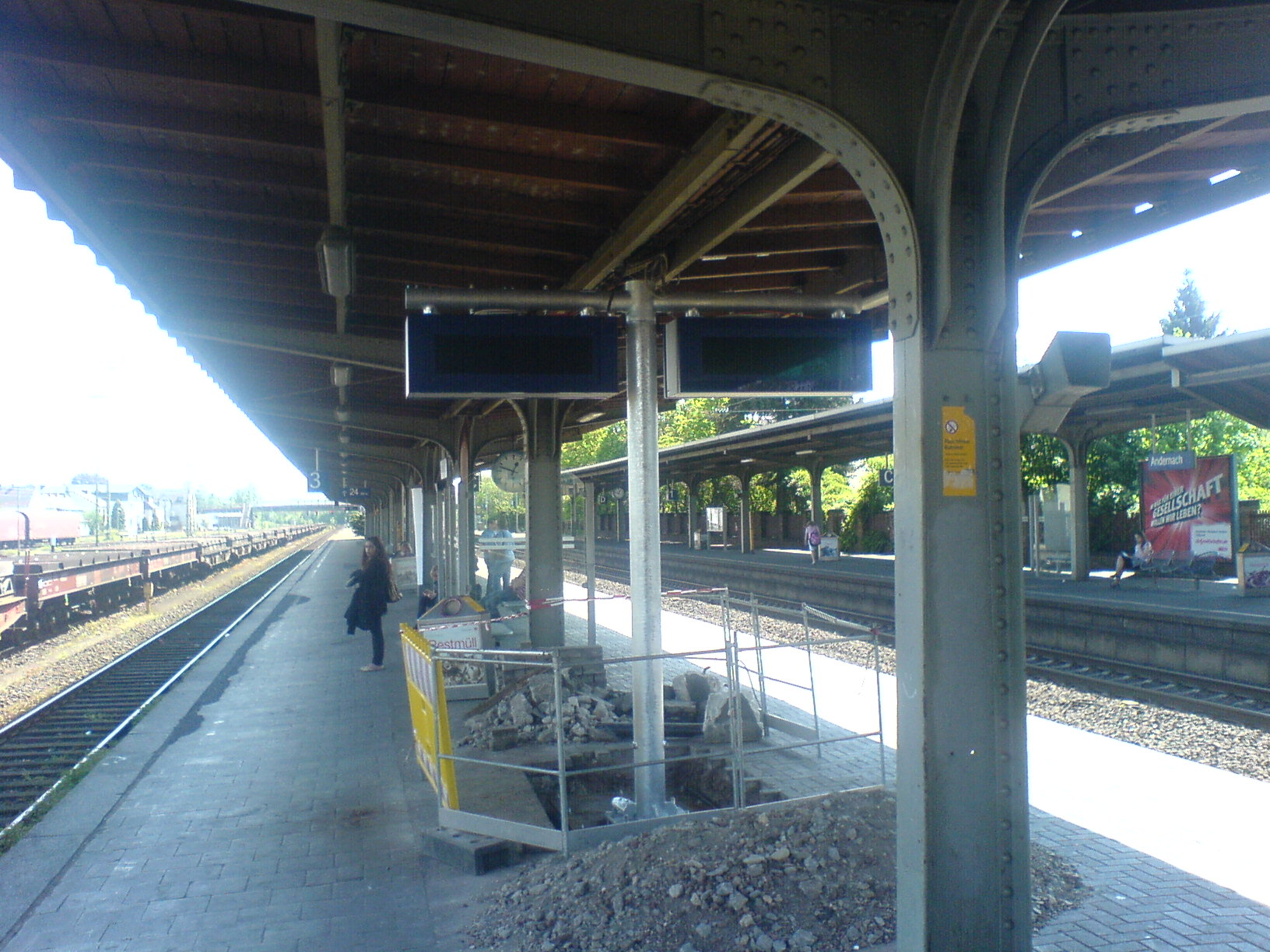
Tracks 2 and 3

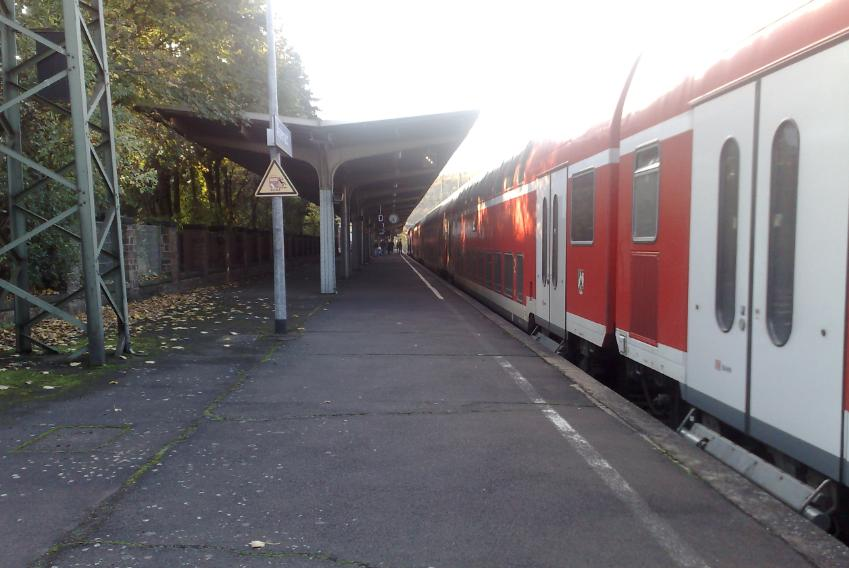
Track 1 with RE5
