= Wupper-Lippe-Express =

RE 49 Wupper-Lippe-Express

Overview
- Owner: VRR
- Line number: RE 49
- Locale: North Rhine-Westphalia, Germany

Service
- Operator(s): DB Regio NRW
- Rolling stock: Flirt 3XL

Technical
- Line length: 86 km (53 mi)
- Operating speed: 160 km/h (99 mph) (max)

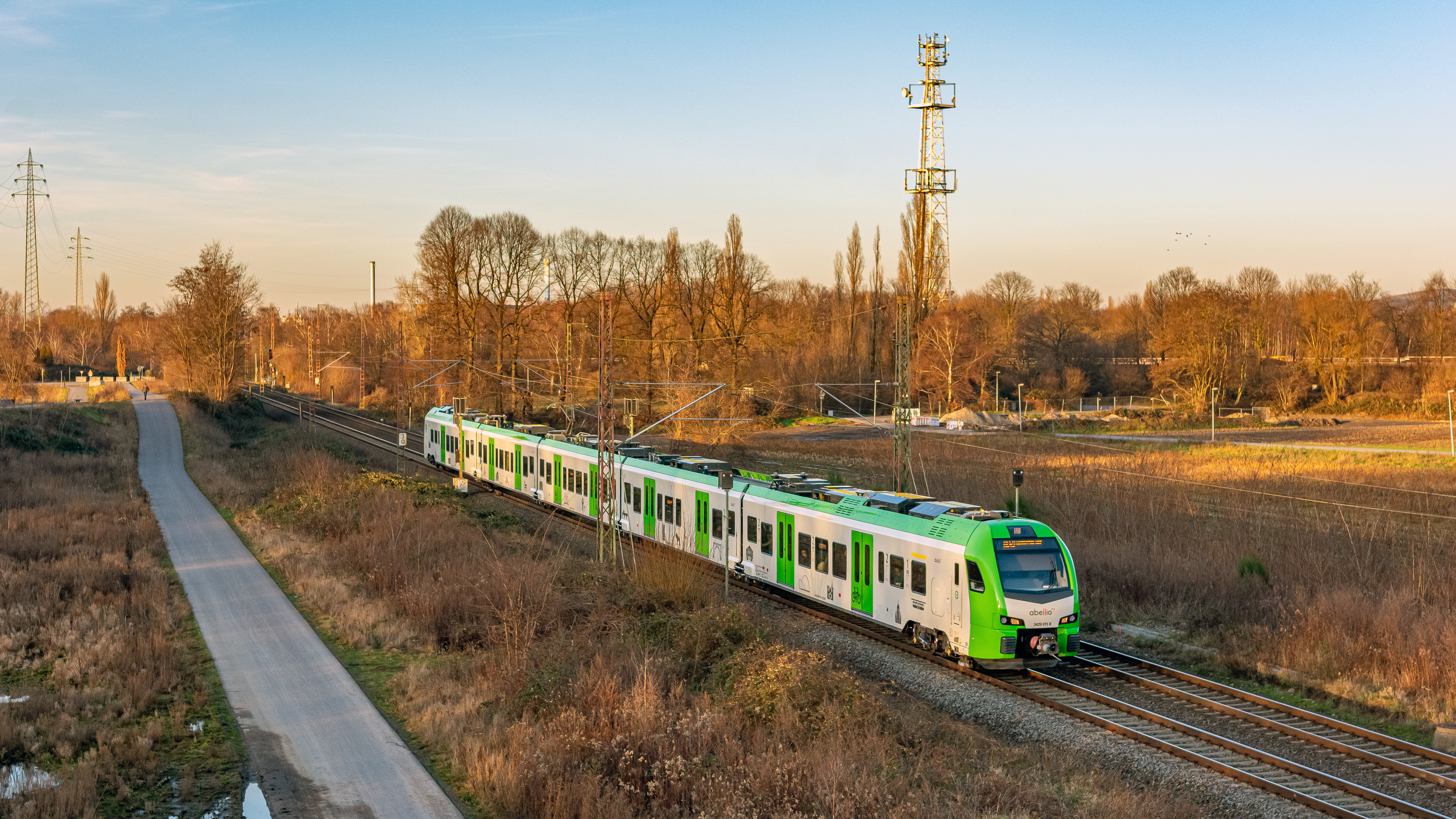
The Wupper-Lippe-Express in Oberhausen-Sterkrade

The Wupper-Lippe-Express is an hourly Regional-Express service in German state of North Rhine-Westphalia, which forms part of the Rhine-Ruhr S-Bahn. It connects Wesel with Wuppertal Hauptbahnhof via Oberhausen and Essen.

The line is operated by DB Regio NRW on behalf of the Verkehrsverbund Rhein-Ruhr (VRR).

== History ==
The RE 49 service was introduced with the timetable change on 15 December 2019. It was introduced together with changes to the S-Bahn network at the 2019 timetable. The service is based on the observation that interchange between the S 3 service from Essen and the RE 5, RE 19 and RB 35 services towards Wesel in Oberhausen was the busiest at any station in the VRR network and this route had no direct service before the introduction of the Wupper-Lippe-Express. In addition, a study found that thinning out the S-Bahn frequencies on the partially parallel S 3 and S 9 services while introducing an express service would result in higher demand. Even before the Wuppertal–Essen line was upgraded to an S-Bahn line, the Initiative S9-Plus lobby group advocated a fast local service between Wuppertal and Essen along with comfortable rolling stock. Originally, the long-planned upgrade of the network would have meant that all cities in the Rhine-Ruhr metropolitan region were served by S-Bahn trains. However, this idea was rejected in the planning phase.

The RE 49 service replaces the Emscher-Niederrhein-Bahn (RB 35) on the Wesel–Oberhausen section and connects the northern section of the S 3 with the southern section of the S 9 in Essen Hauptbahnhof.

DB Regio NRW replaced Abellio Rail NRW as the operator in 2022.

== Services ==
The service only runs from Monday to Friday between 5 a.m. and 7 p.m. An extension of the operating times is planned at a later date. A 20-minute frequency is offered from Monday to Friday on the Wesel–Oberhausen section in combination with the Rhein-Express (RE 5 (RRX)) and the Rhein-IJssel-Express (RE 19) services. There will be three trains an hour on the section from Oberhausen to Essen, taking into account the S 3 services. The same applies to the S 9 service between Essen and Wuppertal. The hourly service is added to 30-minute interval services of S 3 and S 9 on these sections, but the RE 49 services do not stop at all stations.

== Rolling stock ==
Stadler Flirt 3 sets, which are built to a standard VRR design, are used on the line. The VRR acquired a total of 41 railcars of this type for the following lines: S 2, S 3, S 9, RB 32, RB 40 and RE 49.

The VRR commissioned the manufacturer Stadler to maintain the rolling stock. The stock are serviced in a workshop on the site of the former Shamrock colliery in Herne.

== Route ==
The Regional-Express runs on the following lines:

- Düsseldorf–Elberfeld railway from Wuppertal Hbf to Wuppertal-Vohwinkel
- Wuppertal-Vohwinkel–Essen-Überruhr railway from Wuppertal-Vohwinkel to Essen
- Witten/Dortmund–Oberhausen/Duisburg railway from Essen to Oberhausen
- Oberhausen–Arnhem railway from Oberhausen to Wesel

== See also ==
- List of regional rail lines in North Rhine-Westphalia
