= Rhein-Express =

RE 5 Rhein-Express
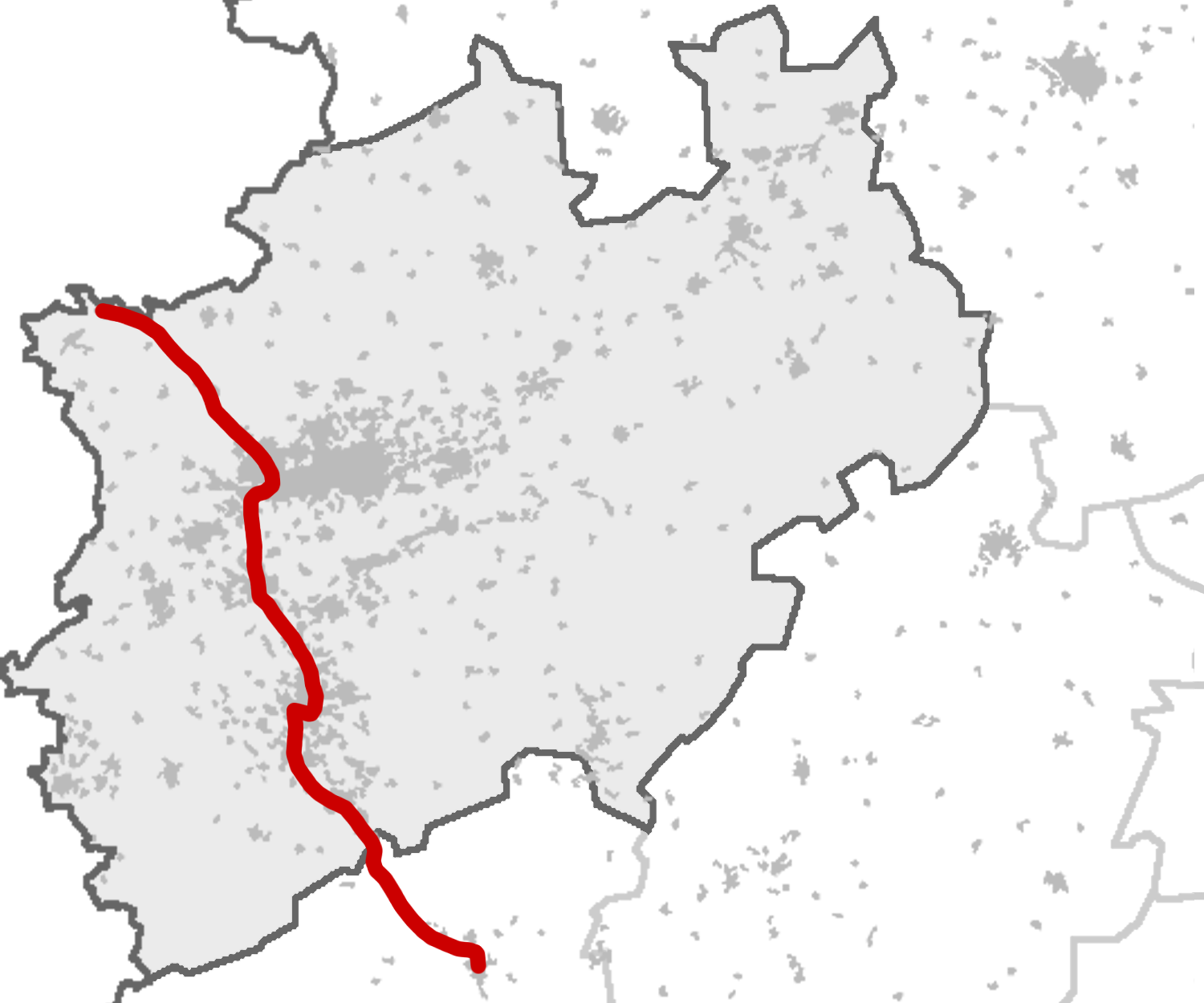

Overview
- Locale: North Rhine-Westphalia and Rhineland-Palatinate, Germany

Service
- Route number: 420 (Emmerich–Duisburg); 415 (Duisburg–Cologne); 470 (Cologne–Koblenz)

Technical
- Line length: 226 km (140 mi)
- Operating speed: 160 km/h (100 mph)

The Rhein-Express is a Regional-Express (RE 5 (RRX)) service, which generally follows the Rhine (German: Rhein) river. It runs daily every hour from 5 am to 9 pm from Wesel via Oberhausen, Duisburg, Düsseldorf, Cologne, Bonn, Remagen and Andernach to Koblenz, in the German states of North Rhine-Westphalia and Rhineland-Palatinate. It is the fourth-most used regional express line in the VRR network with approximately 48,000 passengers a day.

Until the timetable change in December 2016, the Rhein-Express ran to/from Emmerich. Operations on this section and the additional services provided by Regionalbahn service RB 35 (Der Weseler) have since been operated as part of the Rhein-IJssel-Express (RE 19).

== History ==
The Rhein-Express was established in 1998 with the introduction of the integrated regular interval timetable in North Rhine-Westphalia (called NRW-Takt) by combining two services that previously started or finished in Cologne. Originally, the RE 5 service stopped at almost all intermediate stations, as if it were a Regionalbahn service.

In December 2002, several intermediate stops and all overtaking by long-distance trains were eliminated, and the scheduled top speed was increased to 160 km/h (100 mph), shortening the journey time by over 30 minutes between Cologne and Koblenz. The acceleration and the simultaneous thinning of services between Emmerich and Wesel reduced the number of sets of vehicles that was required for the circulation from nine to seven.

Hourly services of the Rhein-Express were restored at the timetable change in 2007 between Emmerich and Wesel in order to compensate for the thinning of RB 35 (Der Weseler) services on the Emmerich–Wesel–Duisburg route as a result of reduced funds for regional transport. In order to reach Emmerich in time for the return journey, it was necessary to reduce stops at some minor stations to two-hour intervals in the direction of least loading.

The problematic section between Emmerich and Wesel was transferred with effect from December 2016 with the letting of the contract for the new Rhine-IJssel-Express (RE 19), since the Rhein-Express now only operates on the Wesel–Koblenz section.

The Rhein-Express was operated by DB Regio NRW from 1998 to June 2019, based at the depot at Cologne-Deutz. National Express has operated the service as the RE 5 (RRX) since June 2019

== Lines ==
The Rhein-Express uses four different lines with eight different route numbers:

- the Oberhausen–Arnhem railway between Wesel (formerly Emmerich) and Oberhausen (used by regional, long-distance and freight trains),
- the Duisburg–Dortmund railway between Oberhausen and Duisburg (all traffic without stops)
- the Cologne–Duisburg railway throughout (long-distance tracks, see note below)
- the Left Rhine line between Cologne and Koblenz (together with regional and intercity services).

In the four to six track section between Duisburg and Düsseldorf, the Rhein-Express and the NRW-Express (RE 1), use the long-distance tracks. The Rhein-Haard-Express (RE 2), the Rhein-Emscher-Express (RE 3), the Rhein-Weser-Express (RE 6), Rhein-Hellweg-Express (RE 11) and the Rhein-IJssel-Express (RE 19) use the so-called local tracks where they exist or the S-Bahn tracks.

== Rolling stock ==
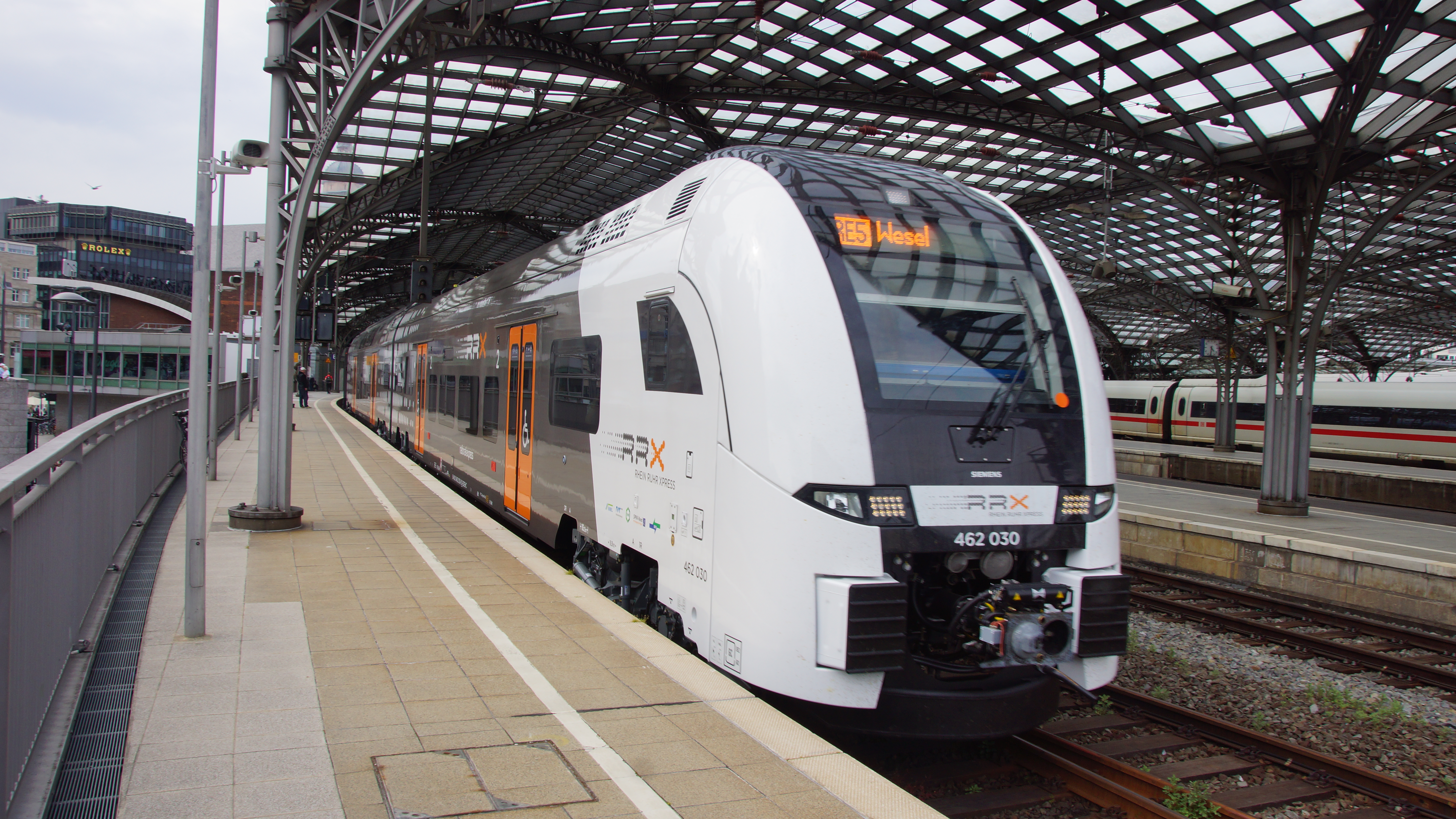
Rhein-Express in Cologne (2019)

Originally, the Rhein-Express was operated with class 110 locomotives and six modernised Silberling carriages without control cars. During 2002, the service was converted to push-pull train trains made up of newly delivered class 146 locomotives and five double-deck carriages. Because of flood damage at the manufacturer of the seats, the delivery of the double-deck carriages was delayed, so that until the summer of 2003 two sets of Silberling carriages could still be found on the service.

Between August and November 2011, the capacity was increased by another car, which means that each train now included a first-class only carriage. This first-class car was usually coupled directly to the engine, while the two-class compartment is in the control car at the other end of the train.

It has been operated with Siemens Desiro HC rolling stock since June 2019.

== Contract ==
Four public transport associations are involved in the operation of the Rhein-Express: the Nahverkehrs-Zweckverband Niederrhein (local transport association of the Lower Rhine), the Verkehrsverbund Rhein-Ruhr (Rhine-Ruhr public transport association), Verkehrsverbund Rhein-Sieg (Rhine-Sieg public transport association) and the Zweckverband Schienenpersonennahverkehr Rheinland-Pfalz Nord (Rhineland-Palatinate North rail transport association).

Tenders for the RE 5 were called on 31 January 2014 as part of the award of the Rhein-Ruhr-Express for the period for the period from December 2019 to December 2033. National Express won the contract for operating the service. The company began operating Siemens Desiro HC rolling stock in June 2019, the provision and maintenance of which was outsourced to Siemens.

Regionalbahn service RB 35, which supplemented the Rhein-Express until December 2016, ran mostly only between Wesel and Duisburg, but in the peak ran between Emmerich and Düsseldorf. It was extended from April 2017 across the Dutch border to Arnhem and was renamed, in accordance with its international importance, the Rhine-IJssel Express (RE 19). The line number RB 35 is now being used for what used to be operated as the northern section of the Rhein-Niers-Bahn (RB 33), which has run between Mönchengladbach and Gelsenkirchen since 2019. The Wupper-Lippe-Express (RE 49) running between Wesel and Wuppertal Hauptbahnhof via Oberhausen was also established in 2019.

As part of the so-called RRX interim contract, services were provided by DB Regio from December 2016 until the commissioning of RRX rolling stock in June 2019. From the beginning of May 2019, single runs of RRX rolling stock were operated in trial mode by National Express.

== See also ==
- Rhein-Sieg-Express
- Lahn-Eifel-Bahn
- List of regional rail lines in North Rhine-Westphalia
- List of scheduled railway routes in Germany
