= Remagen station =

Railway station in Remagen, Germany

Remagen
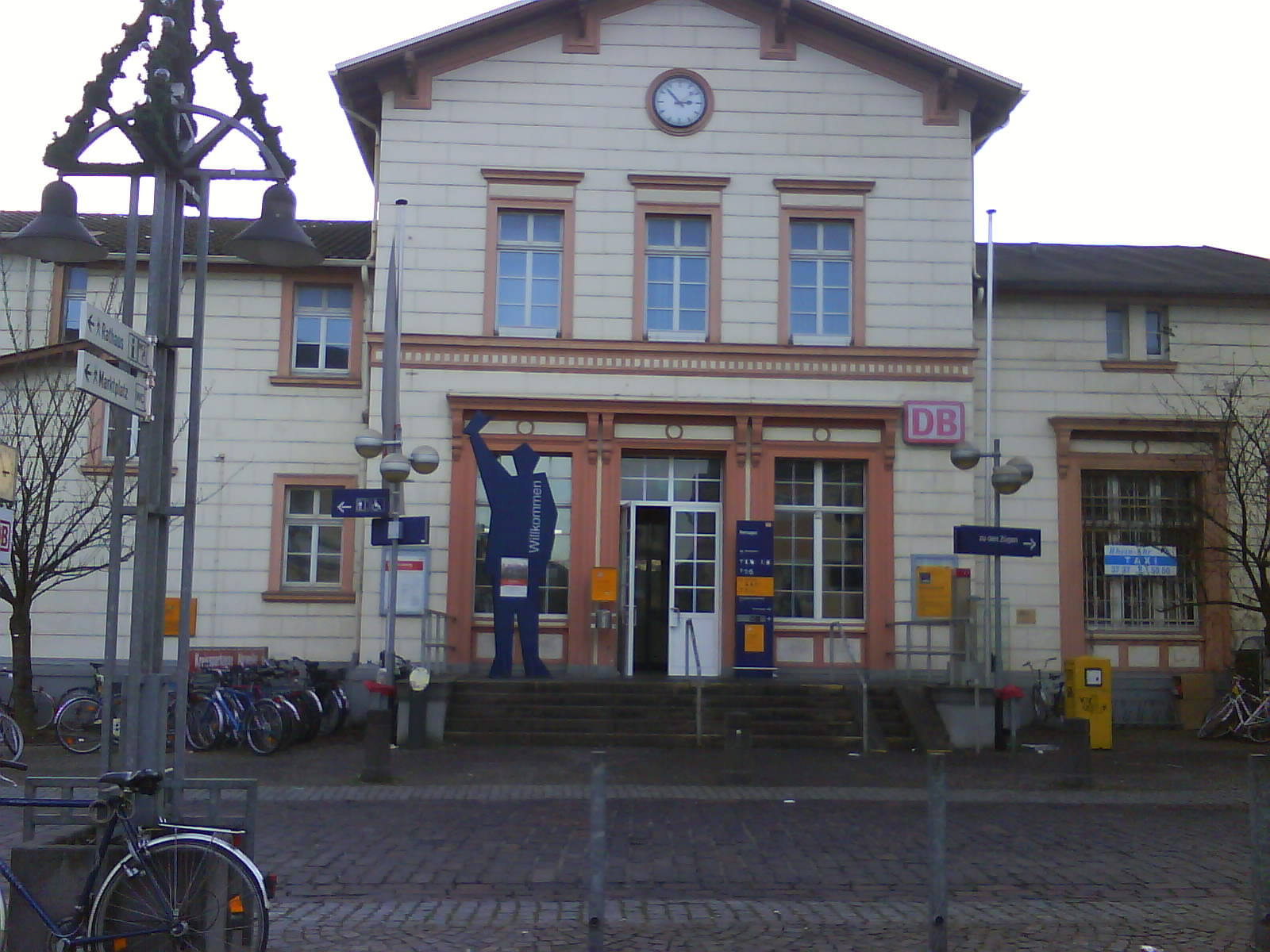
- Entrance building

General information
- Location: Maisons-Laffitte-Platz 2, Remagen, Rhineland-Palatinate; Germany
- Coordinates: 50°34′37″N 7°13′49″E
- Owner: DB Netz
- Operator: DB Station&Service
- Lines: West Rhine Railway (KBS 470); Ahr Valley Railway (KBS 477)
- Platforms: 5

Construction
- Accessible: Yes

Other information
- Station code: 5214
- DS100 code: KRE
- IBNR: 8000310
- Category: 3
- Fare zone: VRM: 817; VRS: 2982 (VRM transitional tariff)
- Website: www.bahnhof.de

History
- Opened: 1858
Services
Preceding station	DB Fernverkehr	Following station
Bonn Hbf towards Berlin Ostbahnhof	ICE 19	Andernach towards Koblenz Hbf
Bonn Hbf towards Emden Außenhafen or Norddeich Mole	IC 35	Andernach towards Koblenz Hbf
Bonn Hbf towards Düsseldorf Hbf	IC 37	Andernach towards Luxemburg|Luxemburg
Preceding station	DB Regio NRW	Following station
Oberwinter towards Bonn Hbf or Brühl	RB 30	Bad Bodendorf towards Ahrbrück
Terminus	RB 39	Bad Bodendorf towards Dernau
Preceding station	National Express Germany	Following station
Oberwinter towards Wesel	RE 5 (Rhein-Express)	Sinzig towards Koblenz Hbf
Preceding station	Trans Regio	Following station
Oberwinter towards Köln Messe/Deutz	RB 26	Sinzig towards Mainz Hbf
Location
- Location within Rhineland-Palatinate

Remagen station is on the Left Rhine line (German: Linke Rheinstrecke) in the city of Remagen in the German state of Rhineland-Palatinate. It is classified by Deutsche Bahn as a category 4 station. The station is served by regular regional services as well as Intercity and EuroCity services. It is also the starting point of the Ahr Valley Railway (Ahrtalbahn).

== History ==
The Left Rhine line from Cologne to Bonn was extended to Rolandseck in 1856 and through Remagen to Koblenz in 1858. The Remagen station building was built in 1860. It has been the beginning and end of the Ahr Valley Railway since 17 September 1880. The station was rehabilitated in the 1930s. Further renovation work was carried out in 2007 and 2008. It has been served by the private railway company trans regio since 14 December 2008.

== Structure ==
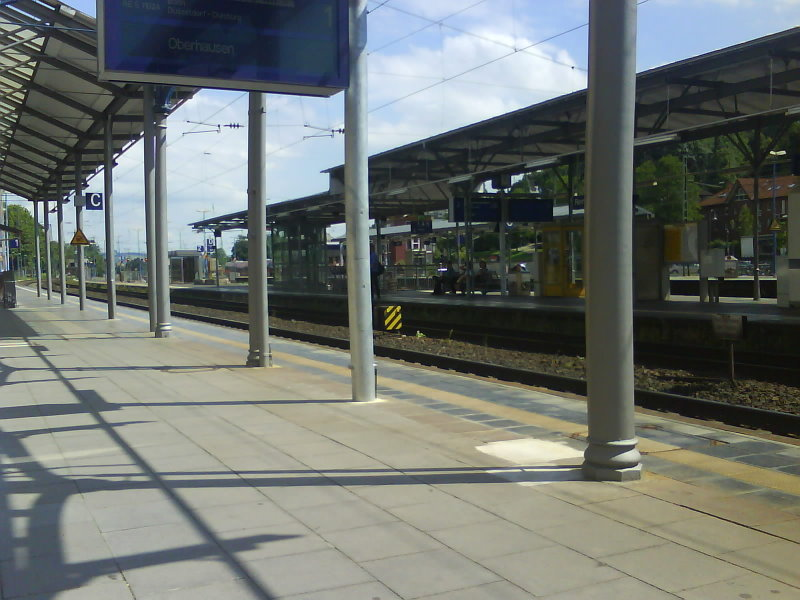
The station seen from the platform at track 1

Remagen station has an entrance building, in which a DB ticket office and ticket machines are located. There are food vending machines on platform tracks 2 and 3 and in the reception building. In the course of renovation work in 2008, the platform roofs were renewed and new LCD destination displays were erected. Each platform has a lift, making them accessible for wheelchairs. Platform track 5 is used only for the Ahr Valley Railway, operated as the Rhein-Ahr-Bahn towards Ahrbrück.

A special feature is the station's cast-iron portico, which is not anchored to the building, but rather stands on its own. The station hall was originally in Bonn and it was removed during the construction of Bonn railway station in 1883/84 and re-erected in Remagen. The hall is thus older than the station itself.

Since 21 March 2009, Remagen station has had a DB service store with access from the main platform and the station building.

== Operations ==
The platforms tracks of Remagen railway station are operated as follows:

Track	Type	Destination	Direction	Length
1	Regional and long distance	Bonn and Cologne	North	404 m
2	Regional	Bonn and Cologne	North	403 m
3	Regional and long distance	Koblenz	South	403 m
4	Regional	Koblenz	South	226 m
5	Regional	Ahrbrück	South/West	226 m

== Train services ==
In the 2026 timetable, the following services stop at the station:

Line	Route	Frequency
ICE 19	Berlin Ostbahnhof – Berlin – (Wolfsburg –) Hannover – Bielefeld – Hamm – Hagen – Wuppertal – Cologne – Bonn – Remagen – Andernach – Koblenz	3 train pairs
IC 35	Norddeich Mole – Emden – Münster – Recklinghausen – Wanne-Eickel – Gelsenkirchen – Oberhausen – Duisburg – Düsseldorf – Cologne – Bonn – Remagen – Andernach – Koblenz	Some trains
IC 37	Düsseldorf – Cologne – Bonn – Remagen – Andernach – Koblenz – Cochem – Bullay – Wittlich – Trier – Wasserbillig – Luxembourg	1 train pair

It is served by services on the following regional lines:

Line	Route	Frequency
RE 5 Rhein-Express	Emmerich – Oberhausen – Duisburg – Düsseldorf – Cologne – Bonn – Remagen – Andernach – Koblenz-Stadtmitte – Koblenz Hbf	60 min
RB 26; MittelRheinBahn	Cologne – Bonn – Remagen – Andernach – Koblenz-Stadtmitte – Koblenz Hbf – Boppard – Oberwesel – Bingen – Ingelheim – Mainz	60 min
RB 30; Rhein-Ahr-Bahn	Bonn – Remagen – Bad Neuenahr – Dernau – Ahrbrück	60 min
RB 39; Ahrtalbahn	Remagen – Bad Neuenahr – Dernau (– Kreuzberg)	60 min
