= Gelduba =

Ancient Roman fort and settlement in present-day Germany

Coordinates: 51°19′59″N 6°40′58″E

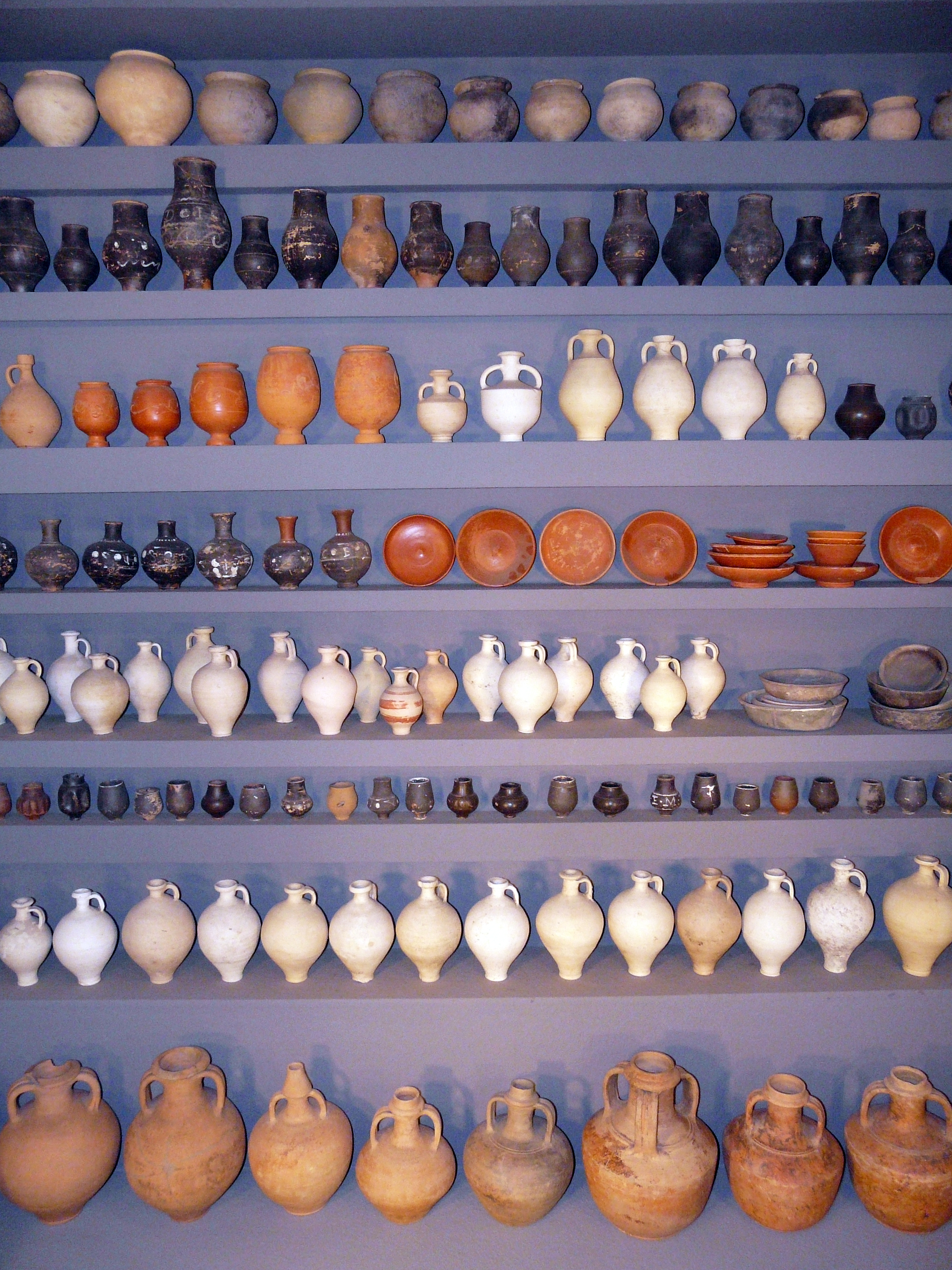
Pottery from Gelduba

Gelduba was a location in ancient Germania Inferior, the modern site of Gellep in the Gellep-Stratum district of Krefeld, Germany.

A cemetery at the site was in use at least from the reign of Nero (AD 54–68). Tacitus mentions the place as the site of a Roman camp and a battle during the revolt of the Batavians in 69–70. Afterwards, a castellum was built there, according to Pliny's Natural History. The original fort of wood and earth went through three stages before it was converted to stone by 150. It was held by the Cohors II Varcinorum equitata. It was destroyed by the Franks after the revolt of Postumus in 259 and again in 275–276. Under the Tetrarchy, it was rebuilt with only a rampart of stone. In 295, it was raised to a castrum. In 353–355, during the reign of Magnentius, it was again destroyed by the Franks. Valentinian I (r. 364–375) had it rebuilt. Around 380, semicircular towers and new ditches were added. It continued in use as a Roman fortress until at least the 5th century.

Gelduba's vicus (village) was still inhabited in the early 5th century, but it was destroyed in a fire a century later. The cemetery remained in continuous use until the later 8th century. It has over 6,000 identified graves. In the Roman period, both the fort and the village made use of it. The graves of Germanic auxiliaries under the late Empire are distinctive for their grave goods. In the course of the 4th century, the orientation of graves changed from north–south to east–west and the prevalence of grave goods declined. By the mid-5th century, the graves assume a distinctly 'Merovingian' character. A new burial space was founded on the western edge of the existing one with a tumulus over a richly adorned grave. Other rich Franks are buried around the tumulus. During the Merovingian period, the cemetery continued to be used by all classes.

== Gallery ==
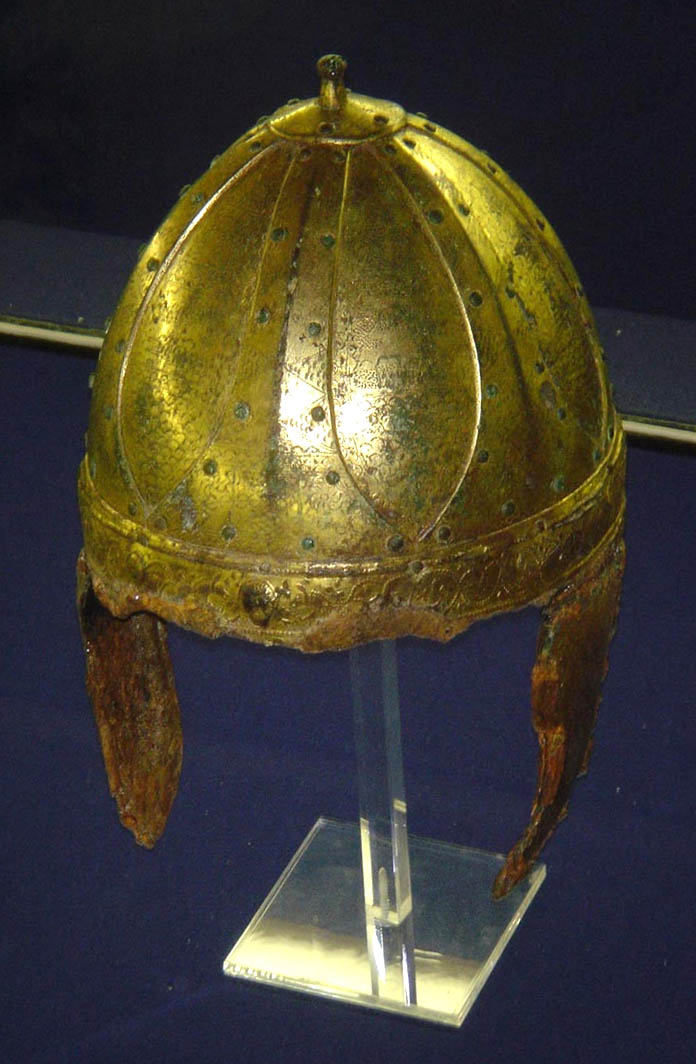
Spangenhelm (6th century)

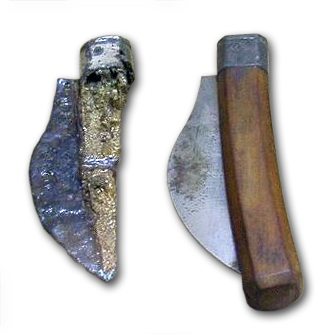
Roman pocketknife and reconstruction

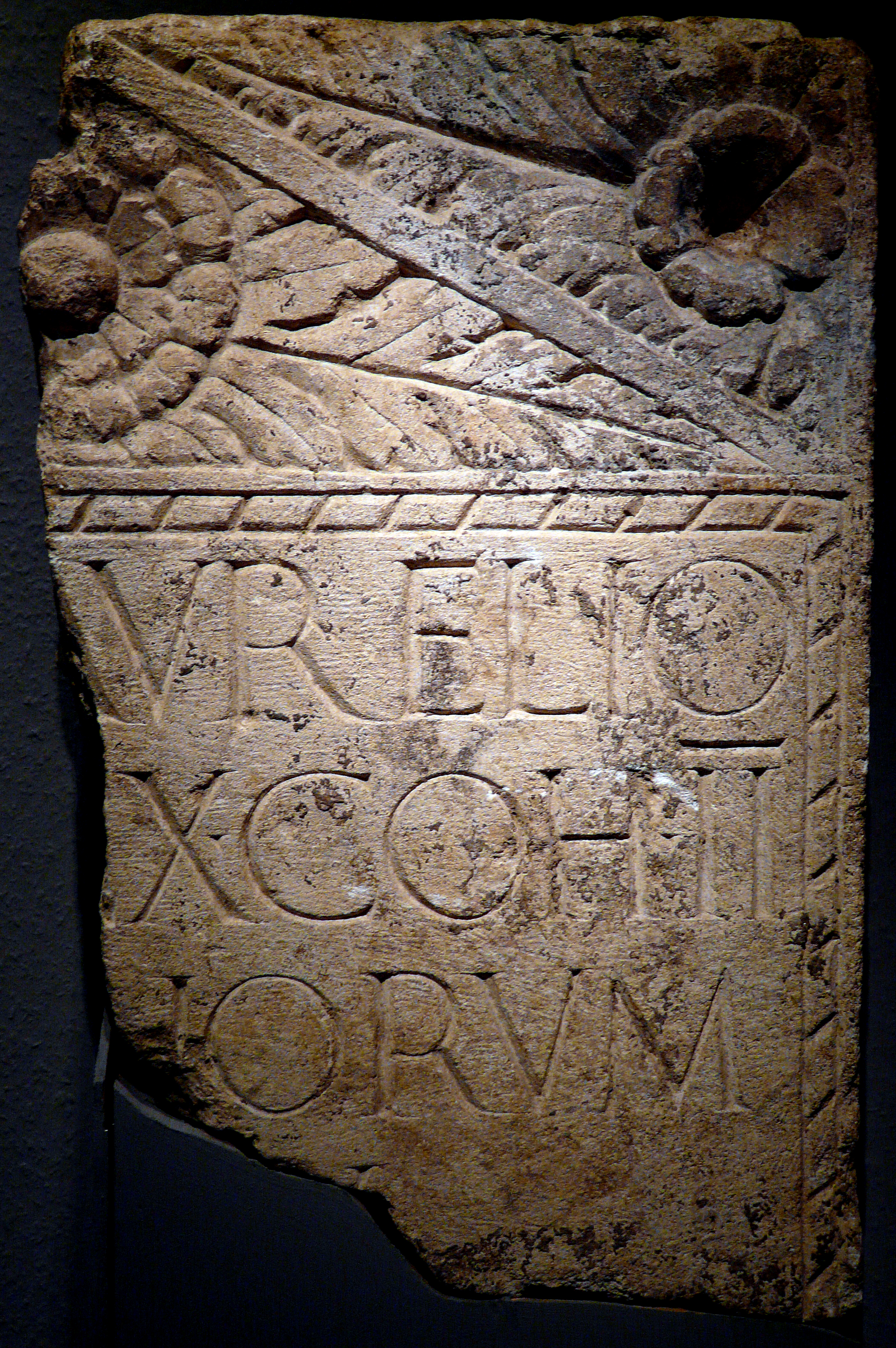
Roman gravestone

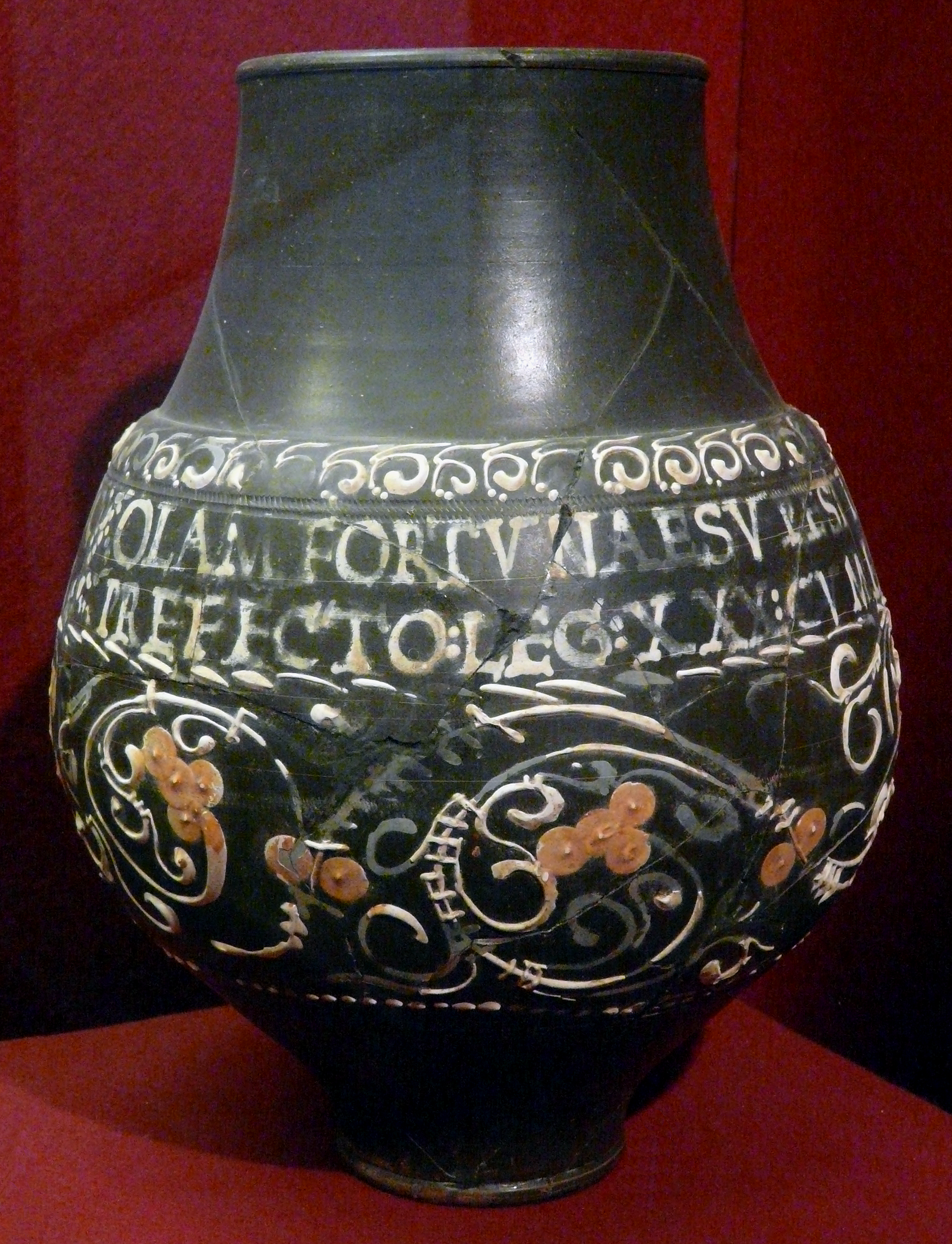
Roman pottery

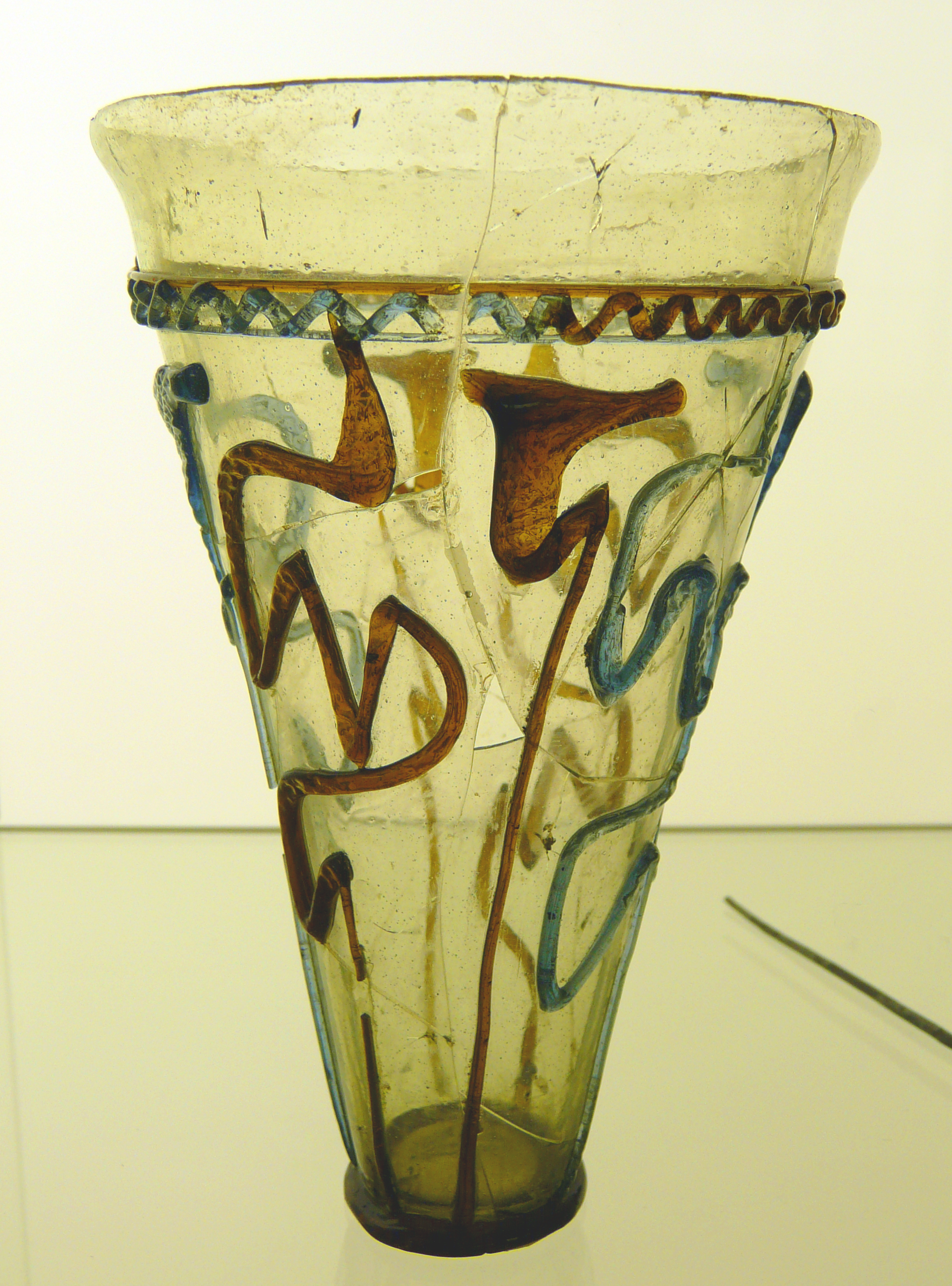
Roman glassware (4th century)

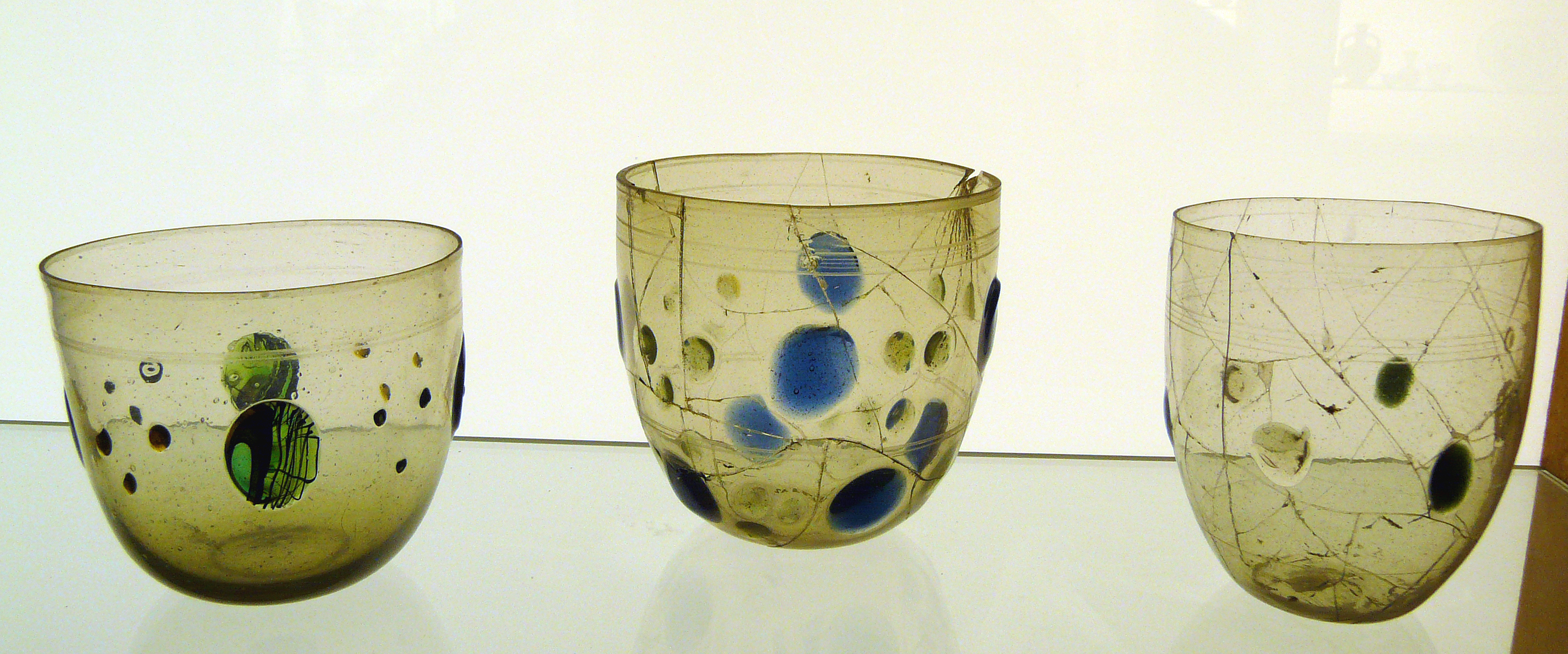
Roman glassware (4th century)

== Bibliography ==
- Brulet, Raymond (2018). "Krefeld-Gellep". In Nicholson, Oliver (ed.). The Oxford Dictionary of Late Antiquity. Oxford: Oxford University Press. ISBN 978-0-19-866277-8.
- Dietz, Karlheinz (2006). "Gelduba". Brill's New Pauly Online. Brill. doi:10.1163/1574-9347_bnp_e420920.
