= Oppum =

Coordinates: 51°19′45″N 6°36′46″E

Oppum is a quarter (Stadtteil) of Krefeld, a city in North Rhine-Westphalia, Germany.

Oppum probably developed as a Frankish farmer settlement. Its existence was first documented in the year 1072. Its population is 12,906 (2019) and its area is 5.37 km^{2} (2.07 sq mi). Together with another quarter called Linn, they form the district Oppum-Linn.
