= Kate Wallach =

American lawyer

Käte Wallach
- Born: May 17, 1905; Krefeld, Germany
- Died: December 27, 1979 (aged 74); Baton Rouge, United States
- Occupations: Lawyer, librarian

Kate Wallach (1905–1979) was a legal scholar and librarian in Baton Rouge, Louisiana, known for her work Research in Louisiana Law.

== Education ==
Kate Wallach was a Jewish woman born to Ludwig Wallach and Berta Wallach (née Schönbeck) on May 17, 1905, in Krefeld, Germany. Her father was a partner in a silk wholesale firm, but lost his position following the rise of the Nazis.

Wallach attended a girls' high school in Krefeld, and attended a Lyzeum in Dahlem after moving to Berlin. Unsatisfied with the level of education, she then continued to attend classes established by Helene Lange. She passed her Abitur (a final examination taken at the conclusion of secondary education) in September 1924. Wallach studied law at Berlin, Freiburg, Würzberg, and Bonn Universities and passed her First State Examination in January 1930 at Cologne University. She then passed her Second State Examination in 1933, but was not allowed to work as a lawyer or assessor following the Law for the Restoration of the Professional Civil Service, that targeted Jews in civil service.

In 1938, Wallach enrolled at the University of Wisconsin–Madison, where she graduated with an LL.B in just two years. She was also admitted to the Order of the Coif, was an honorary editor of the Wisconsin Law Review, and was in the Kappa Beta Phi sorority. In 1942 Wallach received a B.A. In library science. She passed the bar exam in 1942 and was admitted at court.

== Career ==
In 1935, Wallach obtained a temporary visa to emigrate to the United States, and worked as a secretary and taught German. After being rejected from studying law, she worked without pay for a patent lawyer to learn about the American legal system. She moved to New Haven, Connecticut, in 1937 to work as a secretary for Harry Shulman at Yale University. After completing law school, Wallach worked as a cataloger at the law library at the University of Michigan. She became a US citizen in 1942.

She worked as a lawyer in Washington, D.C., with the Office of Price Administration and then the National Labor Relations Board. She was also a member of the Wisconsin State Bar Association. After World War II, Wallach was an advisor on international legal aspects of war crimes. In 1947, she returned to librarianship at the University of North Carolina at Chapel Hill.

In 1949 Wallach moved to Baton Rouge to be an assistant professor for the Louisiana State University law school. Also a member of the library at the law school, she increased the number of books from 75,000 to 205,464 by her retirement. She also conducted academic research, and published Bibliographical History of Louisiana Civil Law Sources, her most important work, in 1955, along with Research in Louisiana Law in 1958, and Union List of Basic Latin American Legal Materials in 1971. She became a chair of the library in 1964, and received a JD in 1966. She resigned from administrative work with the library in 1970.

Wallach was a member of the Soroptimists, and became director in 1951 and president in 1954.

== Personal life ==
Wallach's younger brother Ernst came to the US in 1937. In the process of getting their parents out of Germany, they lost their father in 1941 to a heart attack, their grandmother in 1942 after she was sent to Theresienstadt, and their mother in 1944, who was sent to Auschwitz. Wallach died on December 27, 1979, due to cancer.

== Selected works ==
- "Nichtige Kündigungen nach deutschem Arbeitsrecht. Ein Beitrag zur Lehre vom Bestandsschutz des Arbeitsvertrages." Diss. Köln: 1931
- "Designations of Super-employer Unit under National Labor Relations Act." Wisconsin Law Review (1940): 556–567
- "Postwar Problems of the Law Library Equipment and Quarters." Law Library Journal (1948): 329–334
- Manual for Legal Bibliography. Baton Rouge: 1951; Oil and Gas Bibliography. Baton Rouge: 1953
- Bibliographical History of Louisiana Civil Law Sources. Baton Rouge: 1955
- Research in Louisiana Law. Baton Rouge: 1958
- Union List of Basic Latin American Legal Materials. South Hackensack, New Jersey: 1971
- Louisiana American Legal Research Manual. Baton Rouge: 1972
- Co-author of Comparative Coastal Zone Management. Baton Rouge: 1977.
