= County of Moers =

Historical state (county from ca. 1160, principality from 1702–1801)

County of Moers Grafschaft Moers
- before 1160–1798
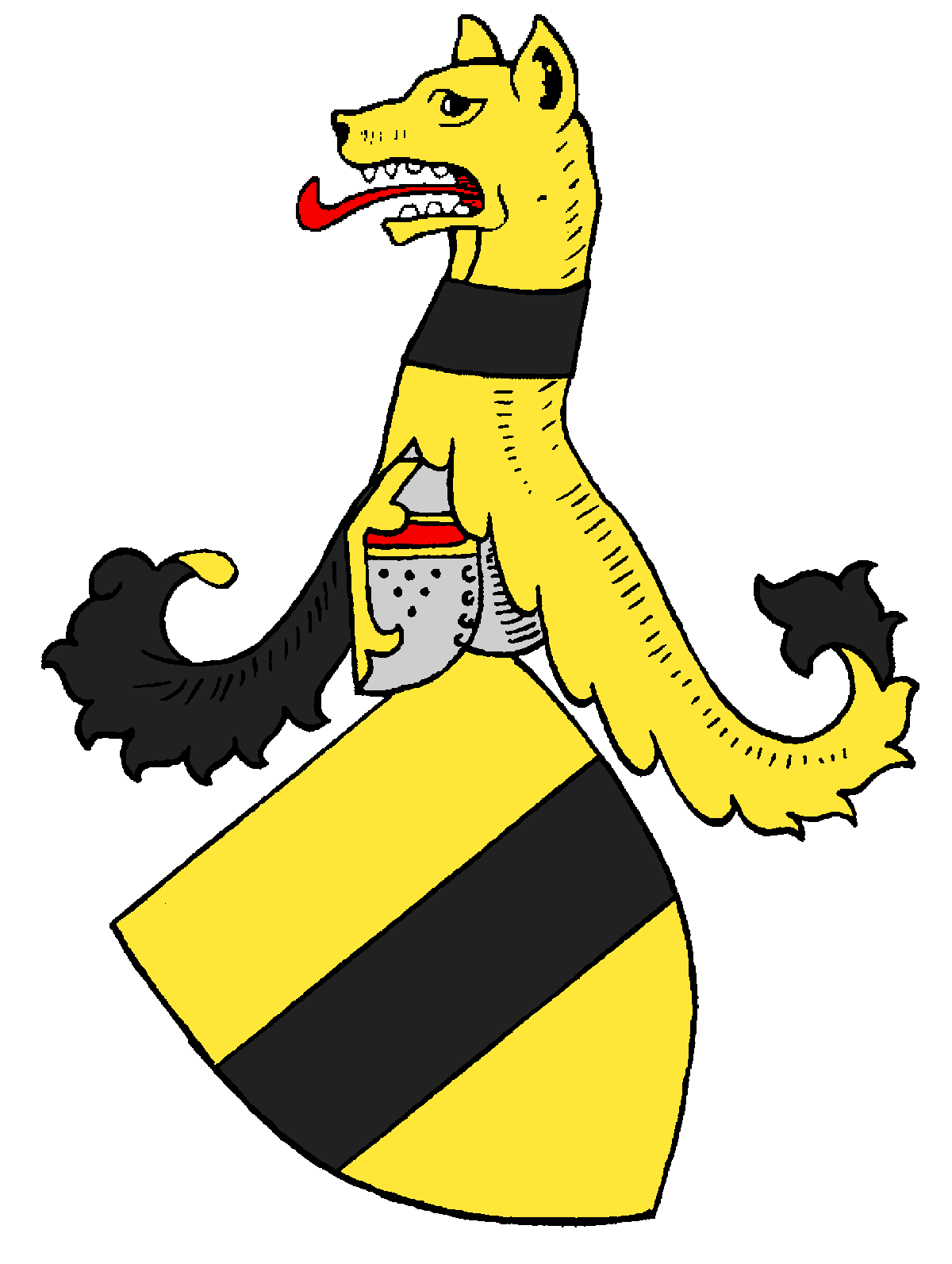
- Coat of arms

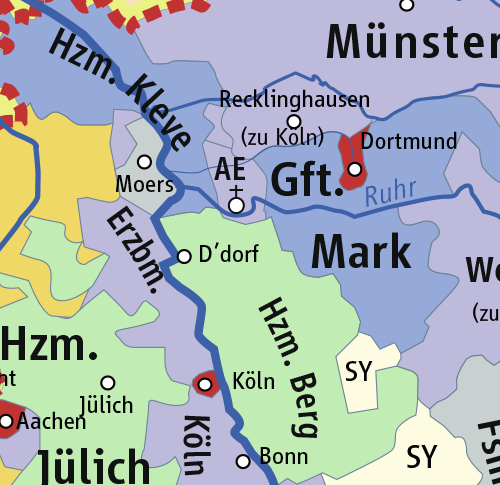
- County of Moers in 1648
- Status: County from 1706 Principality
- Capital: Moers
- Common languages: German; Dutch; Limburgish
- Religion: Roman-Catholic, from 1560 Protestant
- Historical era: Middle Ages
  - Established: before 1160
  - Disestablished: 1798

Area
- c. 1800: 180 km^{2} (69 sq mi)

Population
  - c. 1800: 38,000
Preceded by	Succeeded by
Ruhrgau	Roer (department)

The County of Moers (German: Grafschaft Moers, Dutch: Graafschap Meurs) was a historical princely territory on the left bank of the Lower Rhine that included the towns of Moers and Krefeld as well as the surrounding villages and regions.

== History ==
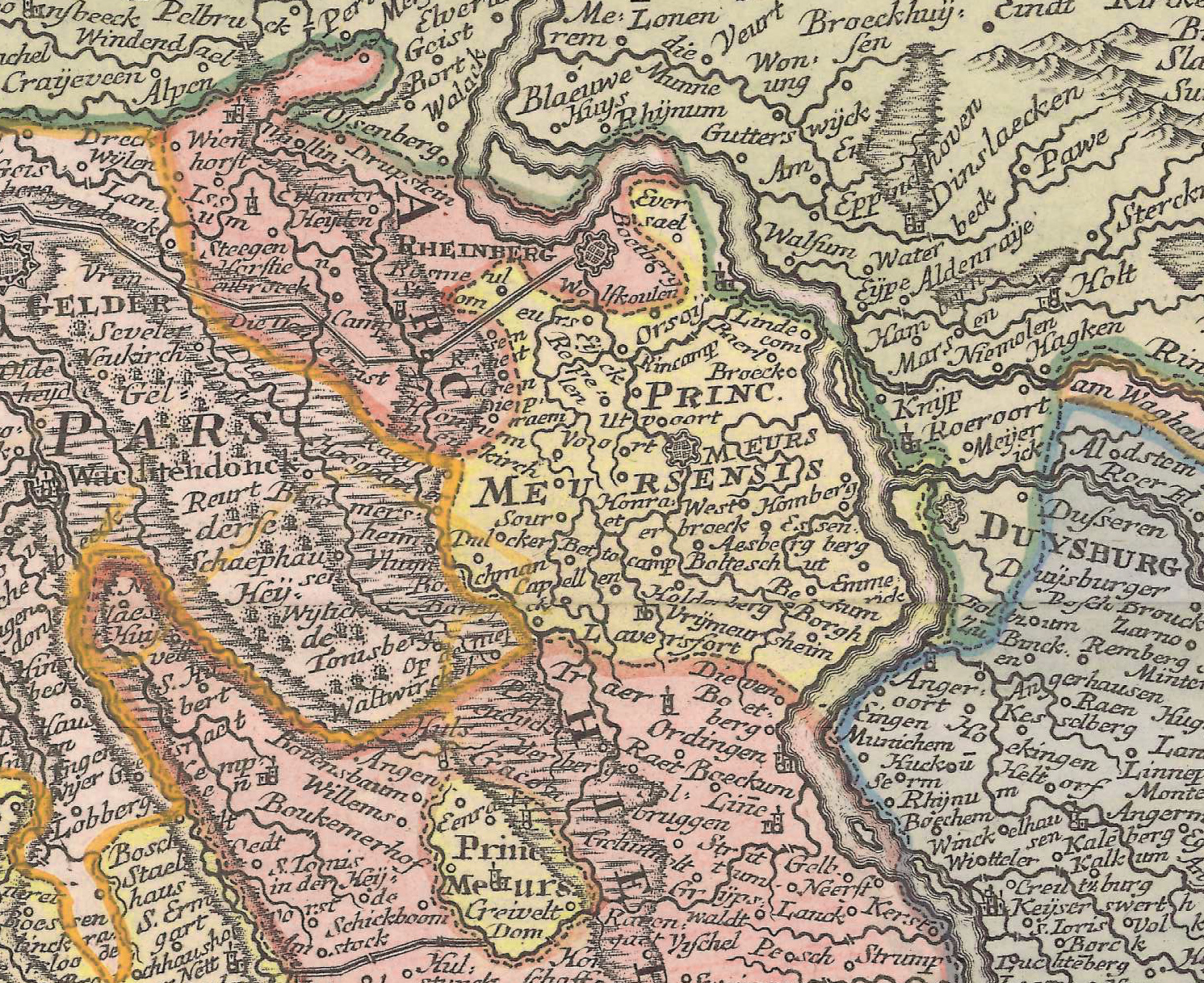
Map of the Principality of Moers (Meurs) in 1730 between Duisburg (Duysburg) on the right and Geldern (Gelder) on the left

The House of Moers went extinct in 1578, after which the county was claimed by the House of Orange-Nassau as well as the Duchy of Cleves.

On the extinction of Orange-Nassau in 1702, the County of Moers was acquired by the Kingdom of Prussia, and elevated to a principality on 6 May 1705.

Although the county was legally dissolved as far back as 1797/1801, the names of communal institutions and local firms often incorporate the word Grafschafter ("comital") which harks back to the County of Moers.

== Literature ==
- Hermann Altgelt: Geschichte der Grafen und Herren von Moers. Düsseldorf, 1845.
- Karl Hirschberg: Historische Reise durch die Grafschaft Moers von der Römerzeit bis zur Jahrhundertwende, Verlag Steiger, Moers, 1975
- Gerhard Köbler: Historisches Lexikon der deutschen Länder. Die deutschen Territorien vom Mittelalter bis zur Gegenwart. Beck, Munich, 1995, ISBN 3-406-39858-8.
- Theodor Joseph Lacomblet: Urkundenbuch für die Geschichte des Niederrheins oder des Erzstifts Cöln, der Fürstenthümer Jülich und Berg, Geldern, Meurs, Cleve und Mark, und der Reichsstifte Elten, Essen und Werden. From sources in the Royal Provincial Archives of Düsseldorf and in the Church and Municipal Archives of the Province, Vol. 4, J. Wolf, 1858.
- Guido Rotthoff: Zu den frühen Generationen der Herren und Grafen von Moers. In: Annalen des Historischen Vereins für den Niederrhein. (AnnHVNdrh) 200, 1997, pp. 9–22.
- Margret Wensky: Moers Die Geschichte der Stadt von der Frühzeit bis zur Gegenwart. In: Von der preußischen Zeit bis zur Gegenwart. 2. Band, 2000, Böhlau Verlag, Cologne, Weimar, Vienna. ISBN 3-412-04600-0.
- Irmgard Hantsche: Preußen am Rhein. Kleiner kommentierter Atlas zur Territorialgeschichte Brandenburg-Preußens am Rhein, Essen, 2002.
- Joachim Daebel: Die Reformation in der Grafschaft Moers 1527–1581. Jubiläumsschrift zur offiziellen Einführung der Reformation in der Grafschaft Moers vor 450 Jahren (1561–2011), Neukirchen-Vluyn, 2011.
- Margret Wensky (ed.): 400 Jahre oranische Befestigung von Schloss und Stadt Moers 1620–2020, Moers, 2020.
- Horst Carl: Das 18. Jahrhundert (1701-1814) – Rheinland und Westfalen im preußischen Staat von der Königskrönung bis zur „Franzosenzeit“. In: Georg Mölich, Veit Veltzke, Bernd Walter (eds.): Rheinland, Westfalen und Preußen. Eine Beziehungsgeschichte, 2nd ed., Münster, 2023, pp. 51–118.
- Martin Früh: “Pour avoir toujours libre accès”: Die DFG-geförderte Digitalisierung der Territorialarchive Geldern und Moers als Beitrag des Landesarchivs Nordrhein-Westfalen zur Erforschung der Rheinischen Landesgeschichte. In: Rheinische Vierteljahrsblätter 88 (2024), pp. 207-224.
