= Marc Schaub =

German ice hockey player

- Born: April 12, 1992 (age 32); Krefeld, Germany
- Height: 6 ft 2 in (188 cm)
- Weight: 194 lb (88 kg; 13 st 12 lb)
- Position: Right wing
- Shoots: Right
- DEL team: Krefeld Pinguine
- NHL draft: Undrafted
- Playing career: 2010–present

Marc Schaub (born April 12, 1992) is a German professional ice hockey player. He is currently playing for Krefeld Pinguine in the Deutsche Eishockey Liga.
