= Fressnapf =

Pet Store

- Industry: Pet food
- Founded: First store in Erkelenz, Germany, founded in 1990
- Founder: Torsten Toeller
- Headquarters: Krefeld, Germany
- Area served: Europe
- Products: Pet food
- Number of employees: 8,000 (2009)
- Parent: Fressnapf Tiernahrungs GmbH
- Website: fressnapf.com

Fressnapf Tiernahrungs GmbH is a German franchise company for pet food. With over 1400 stores and 20 000 employees in 12 European countries it is the largest European pet product retailer.

== History ==
At 24 years of age, Torsten Toeller founded his first store for pet food and pet supplies in Erkelenz, Germany. Inspired by similar American pet superstores, he adapted the concept for the European market. From 1992 on, franchise stores were developed. In 1997, the first stores outside Germany were founded. Since then, the company has been awarded several prizes in Germany, ranking the franchise system among Burger King and McDonald's.

== Franchises ==
Today, Fressnapf has stores in eleven European countries. The highest number of stores is in Germany (777), followed by Austria (90) and Netherlands (52). The company is also present in Switzerland, Belgium, France, Hungary, Romania, Denmark, Poland, Luxembourg, Ireland and Italy. In many non-German speaking countries, the chain is called Maxi Zoo, with the exception of Fressnapf in Hungary and Romania. Jumper in the Netherlands no longer has a partnership with Fressnapf. Fressnapf used to have stores in Italy under the MaxiZoo brand but in 2022 they fused their MaxiZoo italian branch (MaxiZoo S.p.a.) into their competitor Arcaplanet, which was bought by the Cinven investment fund earlier. The merging left Arcaplanet as the only surviving brand, with Fressnapf being a minority shareholder of the Arcaplanet chain, while Cinven held the majority of shares. In 2024 Fressnapf bought all shares from Cinven and became the sole owner of the Arcaplanet brand.
