= Forstwald =

Coordinates: 51°18′00″N 06°29′51″E

Forstwald is a quarter (Stadtteil) of Krefeld, western Germany, located to the west of the main city center. It is marked by its forest landscape and more up-scale housing than other regions of Krefeld. Its population is 3,545 (2019) and its area is 4.12 km^{2} (1.59 sq mi).
