= Krefeld =

Krefeld Krieëvel (Limburgish)
- City
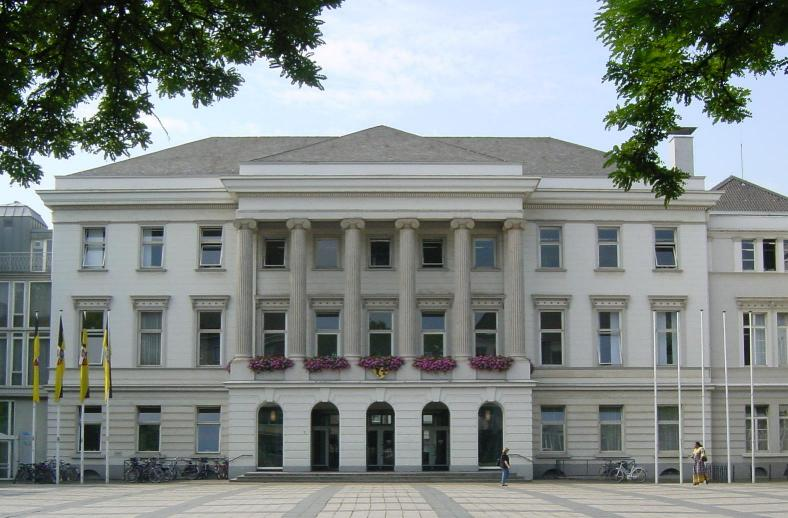
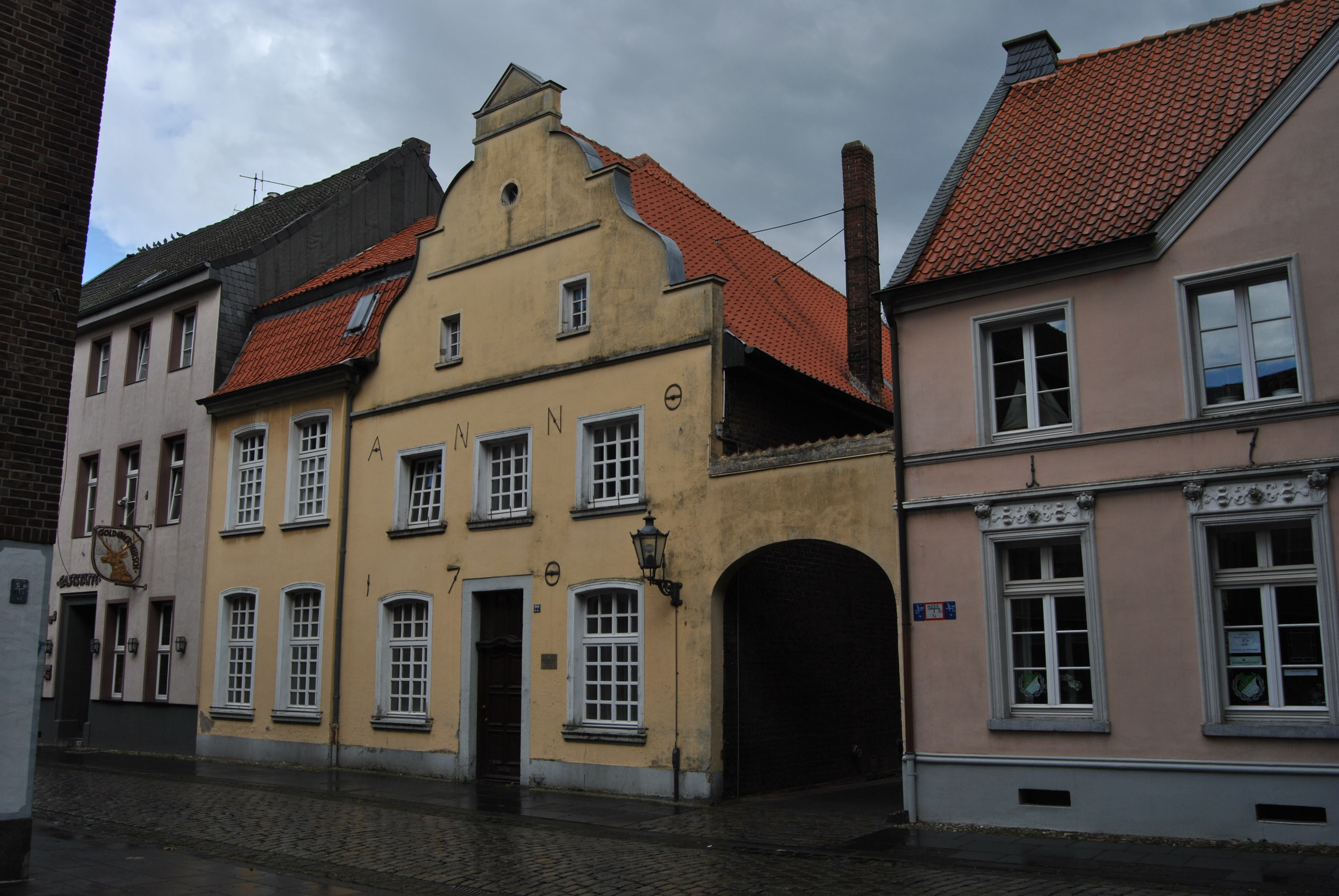
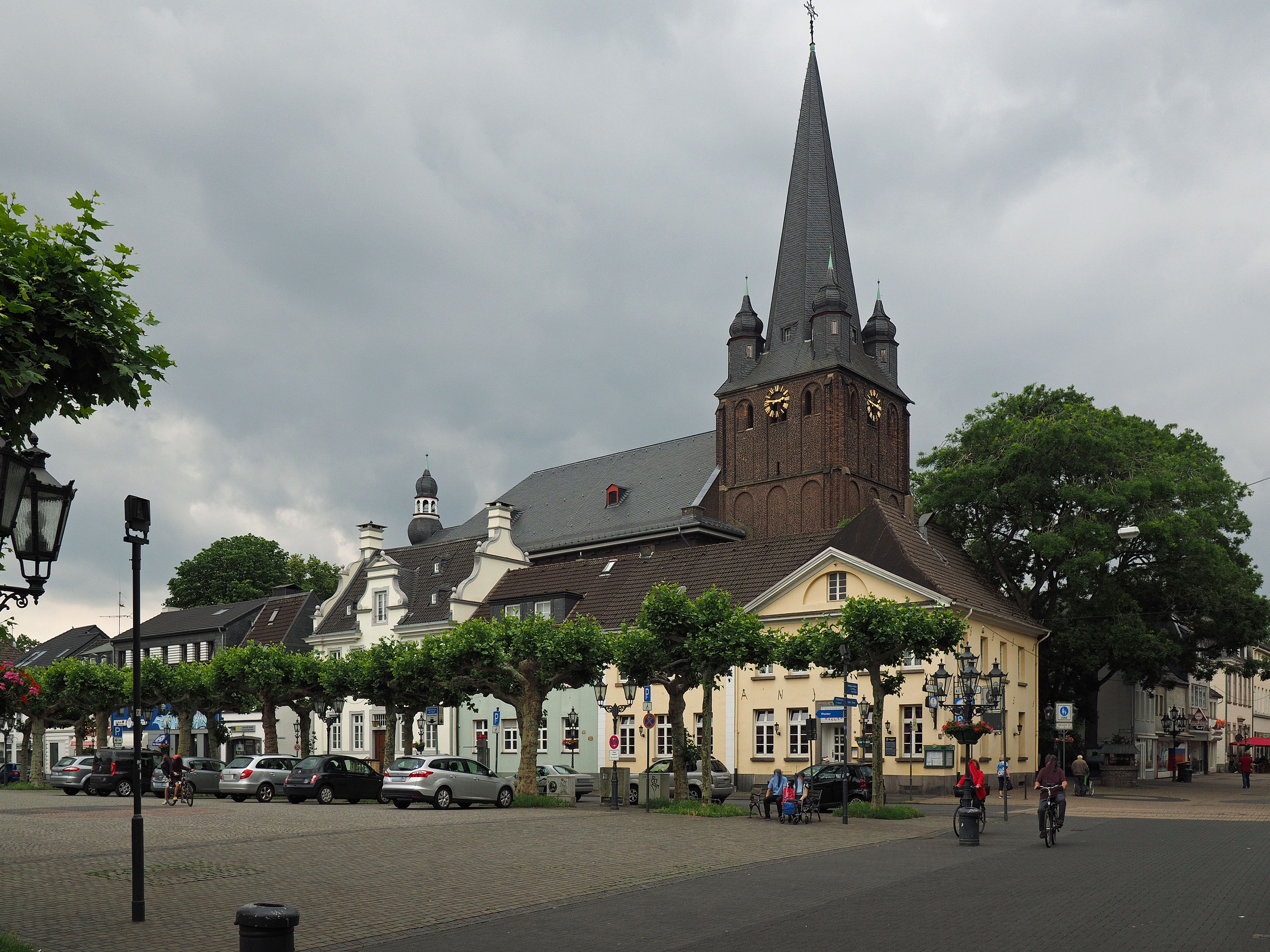
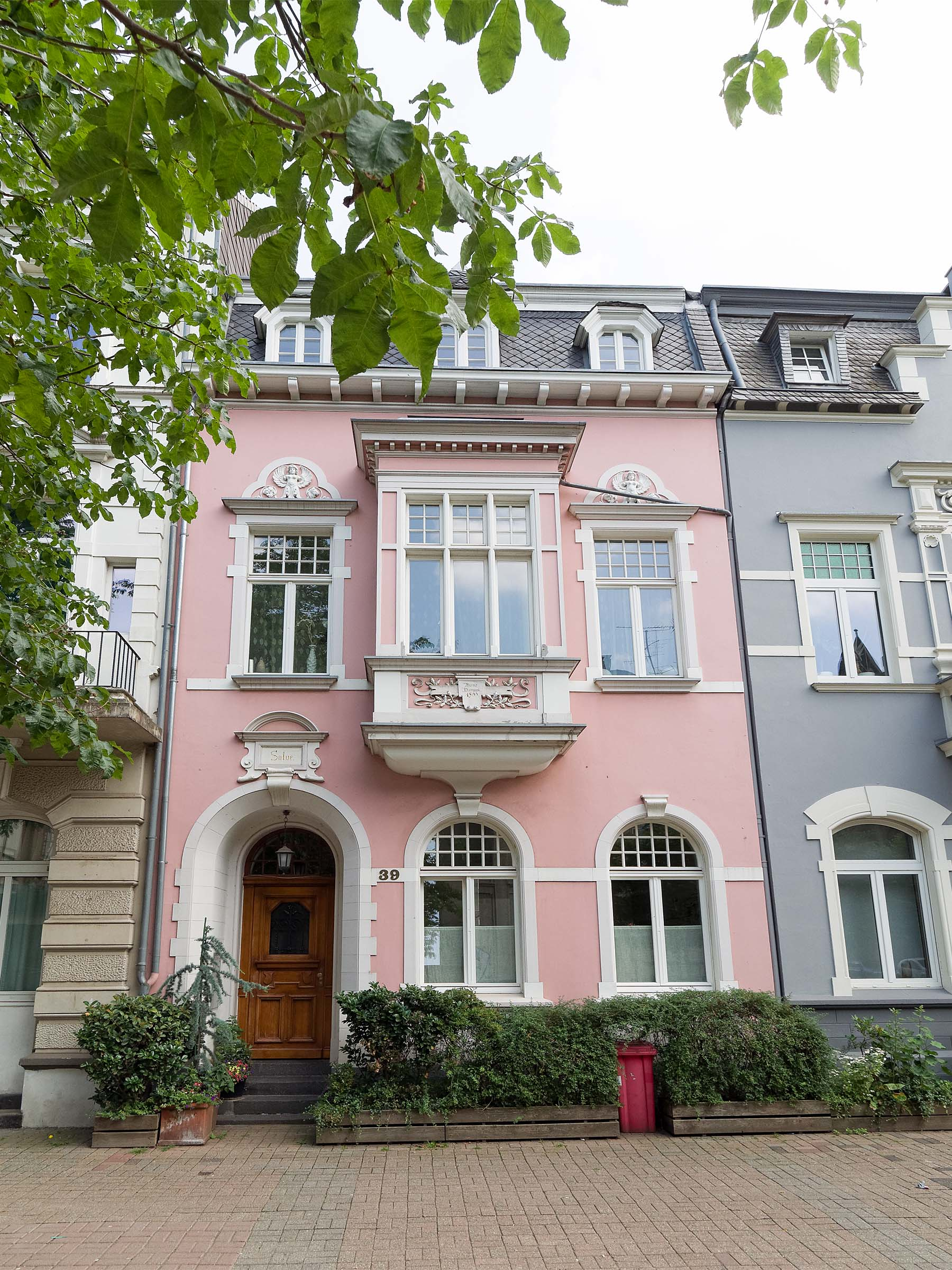
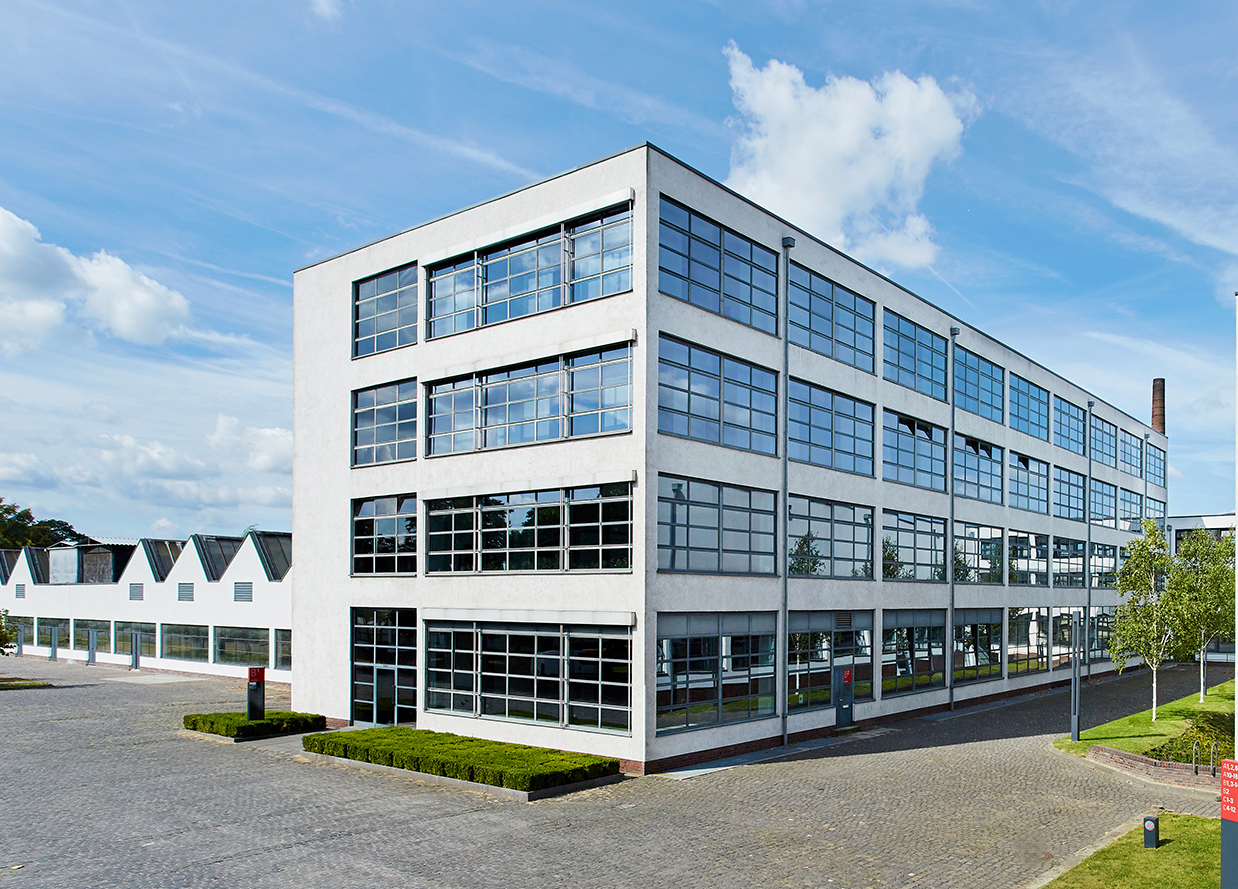
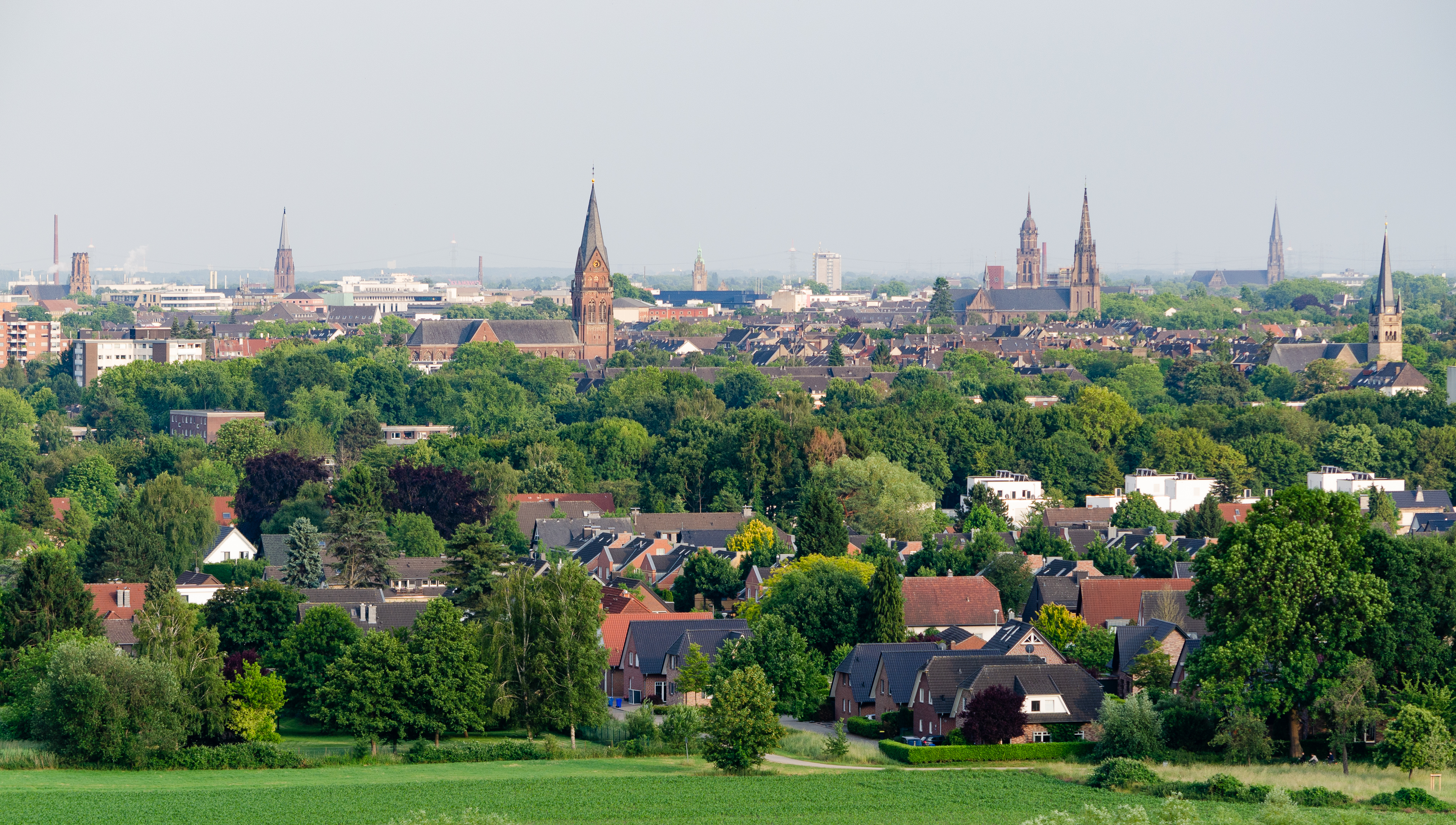
- City Hall Hüls old town Uerdingen market square Gründerzeit style buildings Bauhaus style building view of the centre from Kapuzinerberg

- Flag Coat of arms
- Interactive map of Krefeld
- Location within Germany Location within North Rhine-Westphalia
- Coordinates: 51°20′N 06°34′E
- Country: Germany
- State: North Rhine-Westphalia
- Admin. region: Düsseldorf
- District: Urban district

Government
  - Mayor (2020–25): Frank Meyer (SPD)

Area
  - Total: 137.68 km^{2} (53.16 sq mi)
- Elevation: 39 m (128 ft)

Population (2025-12-31)
  - Total: 230,738
  - Density: 1,675.9/km^{2} (4,340.6/sq mi)
- Time zone: UTC+01:00 (CET)
  - Summer (DST): UTC+02:00 (CEST)
- Postal codes: 47701-47839
- Dialling codes: 02151
- Vehicle registration: KR
- Website: www.krefeld.de

Krefeld (/ˈkreɪfɛld, -ɛlt/ KRAY-feld, -felt; German: [ˈkʁeːfɛlt]; Limburgish: Krieëvel [ˈkʀiə˦vəl]), also spelled Crefeld until 1925 (though the spelling was still being used in British papers throughout the Second World War), is a city in North Rhine-Westphalia, in western Germany. It is located northwest of Düsseldorf, its center lying just a few kilometers to the west of the river Rhine; the borough of Uerdingen is situated directly on the Rhine. Because of its economic past, Krefeld is often referred to as the "Velvet and Silk City". It is reached by the autobahns A57 (Cologne–Nijmegen) and A44 (Aachen–Düsseldorf–Dortmund–Kassel).

The city's origins lie in a medieval settlement first documented in the 12th century. After passing to the County of Moers, Krefeld came under the rule of the House of Orange-Nassau in the early modern period, when policies of religious toleration encouraged the settlement of Mennonites, whose commercial networks contributed significantly to its economic growth. The city became part of the Kingdom of Prussia in 1702 and expanded rapidly during the Industrial Revolution. In 1929 it was enlarged through the incorporation of neighbouring municipalities, including Uerdingen, forming the modern city.

Krefeld is known for its extensive parks and tree-lined avenues, as well as for cultural institutions including the Kunstmuseen Krefeld. Notable sights include the medieval Linn Castle and the adjoining historic old town of Linn. The city is also associated with modern architecture, particularly Haus Lange and Haus Esters, designed by Ludwig Mies van der Rohe.

== History ==
=== Early history ===
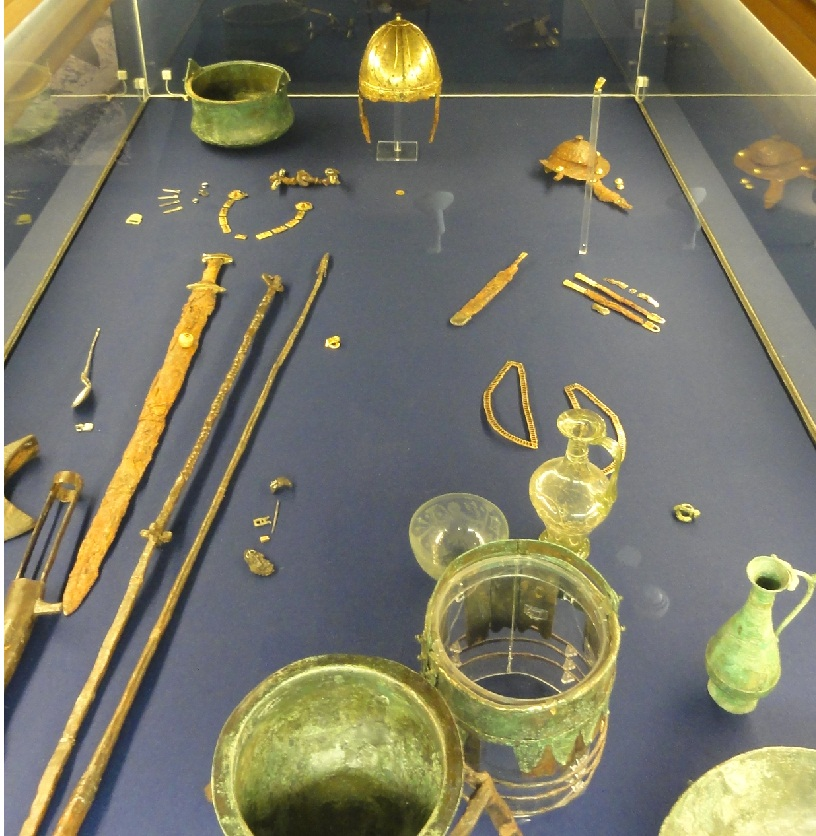
Frankish grave, c. 500 AD, with golden Spangenhelm from Gelduba (modern-day Gellep)

The territory of modern Krefeld includes settlements with distinct histories. At Gelduba (modern-day Gellep), beside the Rhine, a Roman fort existed from about AD 70 into the fifth century. Archaeological finds also document subsequent Frankish occupation.

Records first mention Krefeld in 1105 under the name of Krinvelde.

Medieval Krefeld belonged to the counts of Moers. It received market rights in 1361 and town privileges in 1373, with the approval of Emperor Charles IV.

In February 1598, Walburga, wife of Adolf van Nieuwenaar, and last Countess of Limburg and Moers, gave the County of Moers, which included Krefeld, to Maurice, Prince of Orange. After her death in 1600, John William of Cleves took possession of these lands, but Maurice successfully defended his heritage in 1601. Krefeld and Moers would remain under the jurisdiction of the House of Orange and the Dutch Republic during the Dutch Golden Age (1588–1672). Krefeld was one of few towns spared the horrors of the Thirty Years' War (1618–1648). The town of Uerdingen, incorporated into Krefeld in the 20th century, had been destroyed at the hands of troops from Hesse during the Thirty Years' War, and almost ceased to exist.

Krefeld's economic development in the Early Modern Period was closely associated with religious migration. Refugees from Jülich and Berg contributed to the growth of linen manufacture during the seventeenth century.

After the death of William III of Orange in 1702, Krefeld passed to the Kingdom of Prussia. The Battle of Krefeld occurred nearby in 1758 during the Seven Years' War. Krefeld and Uerdingen were included within the Prussian Province of Jülich-Cleves-Berg in 1815 (after 1822 the Rhine Province).

The population of the settlement was 16,325 in 1825 but had grown to 30,000 by the 1840s.

In 1872 Krefeld became an independent city within Rhenish Prussia. In 1918 during the First World War the Belgian Army used it as a base during the occupation of the Rhineland. In 1929 Krefeld and Uerdingen merged to form Krefeld-Uerdingen; in 1940 the name was shortened to simply Krefeld.

=== The Mennonites of Krefeld ===
From 1607 Mennonites arrived in Krefeld, as in nearby Gronau, from neighboring Roman Catholic territories where they were persecuted. In 1609 Herman op den Graeff, originally from Aldekerk, moved with his family to Krefeld. There he became a lay preacher and chairman of the Mennonite religious community. In 1637, Op den Graeff was referred to as "the Mennonite lord Bishop" (der hiesigen Mennoniten Herrn Bischof) of Krefeld in the reformed community's minutes book. They sought refuge in the lands of the more tolerant House of Orange-Nassau, at the time rulers of Krefeld; in 1657 their congregation was officially recognized and in 1693 they were allowed to build their own church, although hidden in a back yard (which still exists, reconstructed after World War II, with about 800 members). Also the Quaker Evangelists received a sympathetic audience among the larger of the German-Mennonite congregations around Krefeld, Gronau, Emden and Altona, Hamburg. In 1683 a group of thirteen Mennonite families (twelve of them Mennonite-Quakers), the so called Original 13, including three of the Op den Graeff families left Krefeld to re-settle in Pennsylvania in order to enjoy religious freedom. They crossed the Atlantic on the ship Concord, and founded the settlement of Germantown (now incorporated in Philadelphia), invited by William Penn, and thus beginning the Pennsylvania Dutch ethnic identity. The most important Mennonite family of Krefeld were the silk merchants and silk weaving industrialists Von der Leyen who, by 1763, employed half of Krefeld's population of 6,082 in their factories. Their residence, built from 1791, is the current City Hall.

=== The Jews of Krefeld ===
Jews were listed as citizens of Krefeld from 1617. In 1764, a synagogue was erected, and by 1812, under French rule, the town included 196 Jewish families, with three Jewish-owned banks. Under Napoleon, the town became the capital for the surrounding Jewish communities including over 5000 Jews, and by 1897 they comprised 1.8% of the population. In 1846 a Jewish representative was voted onto the town's municipal council, while rising antisemitism was noted during these elections. A reform synagogue was built in 1876, arousing opposition from the Orthodox community. A Jewish school existed in the town, with more than 200 students around 1900.

In November 1938, during the November pogroms, a synagogue on Marktstraße, as well as synagogues in Linn, Uerdingen and Hüls were destroyed, in addition to attacks on Jewish shops and homes. In 1941 following an order from Hitler to deport the German Jews to the east, Jews from the town were sent to the area around Riga and murdered there.

In 2008, a new synagogue, library and Jewish cultural center were erected on the location of one of the demolished synagogues. Around 1100 Jews were reported to live in and around Krefeld at the time.

=== World War II ===
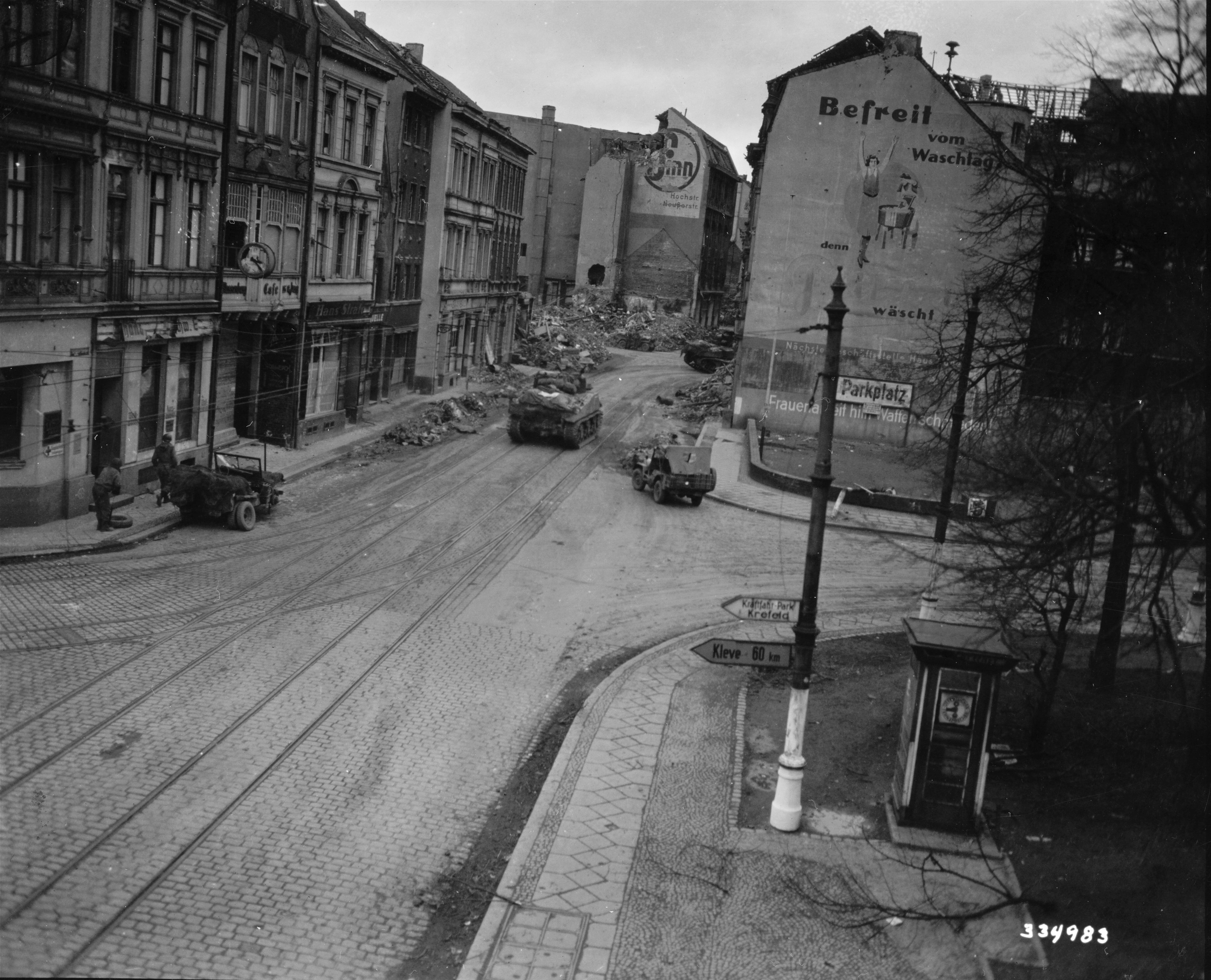
5th Armored Division of the US Army in Krefeld in March 1945

On 11 December 1941, during World War II, a detailed report on the transport of Jews from Krefeld and its surroundings listed 1007 Jews from Krefeld and Duisburg that were deported to the Šķirotava Railway Station near Riga, later to become Jungfernhof concentration camp. They were transported in freezing conditions with no drinking water for more than two days. Almost immediately upon arrival, they were shot in the Rumbula forest massacre.

Forced laborers of the 3rd SS construction brigade were dispatched in the town in 1943.

On 21 June 1943, British bombs destroyed many buildings in the east part of the city; a firestorm consumed large parts of the city center (apart from the central train station, which remained intact apart from minor damage). On 3 March 1945 US troops entered Krefeld. After occupying the city and due to a lack of fluent German speakers in the intelligence unit to which he was assigned, the U.S. Army placed Henry Kissinger, then a private, in charge of the city administration.

During the Cold War, the city was host to the 16th Signal Regiment of the United Kingdom's Royal Corps of Signals stationed at Bradbury Barracks. The town became part of the new state of North Rhine-Westphalia after World War II.

== Geography ==
Krefeld is located in the Lower Rhine region of the state of North Rhine-Westphalia in western Germany. The city lies on the western bank of the Rhine, opposite the city of Duisburg, and is part of the Rhine-Ruhr metropolitan region.

Krefeld shares borders with several municipalities, including Duisburg, Meerbusch, Willich, Tönisvorst, Kempen, and Moers.

=== Districts ===
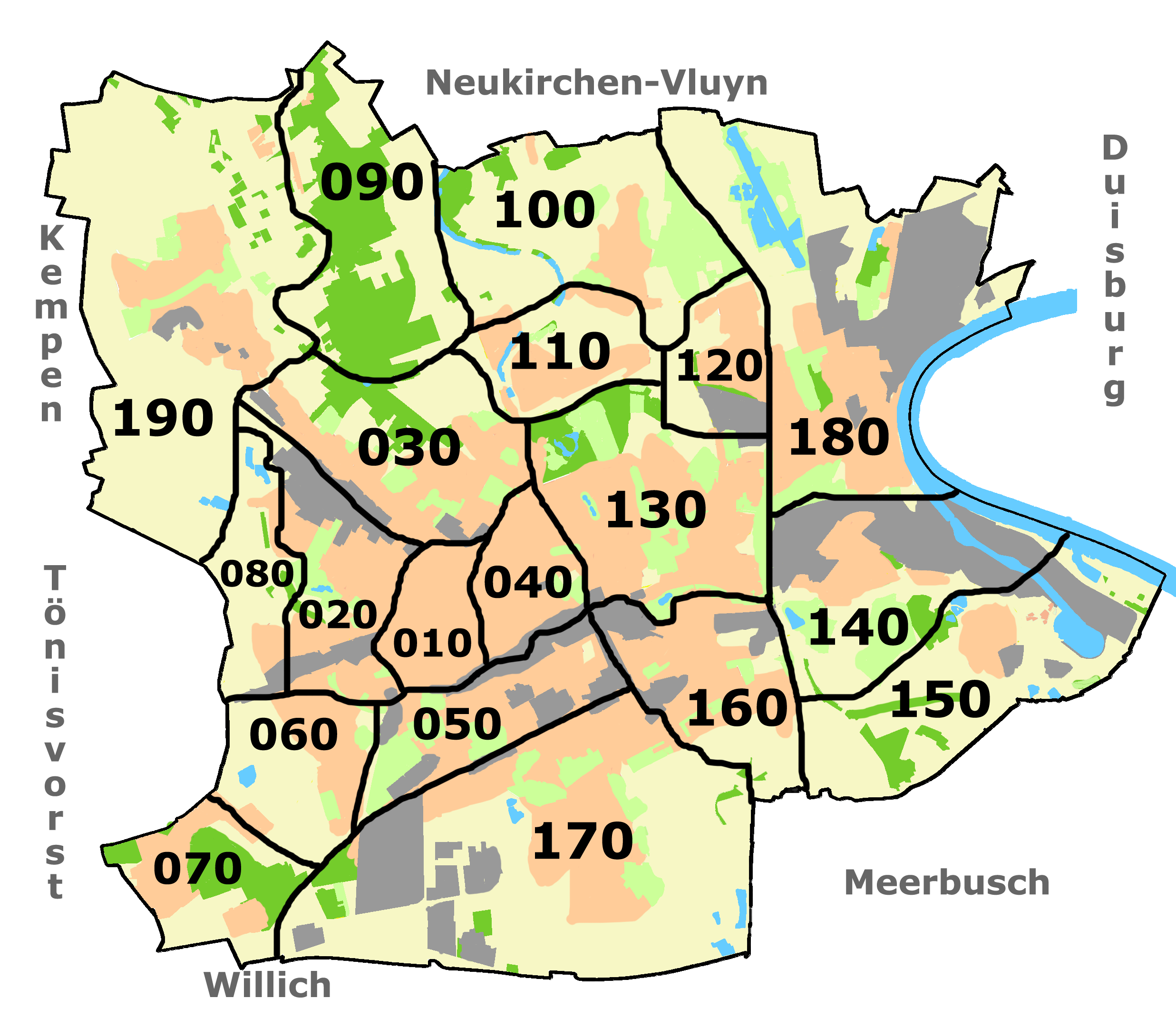
Stadtbezirke in Krefeld

There are a number of districts in Krefeld. Each has a municipal representative, with representatives chosen by local elections. The districts are:

- 010 Stadtmitte
- 020 Kempener Feld/Baackeshof
- 030 Inrath/Kliedbruch
- 040 Cracau
- 050 Dießem/Lehmheide
- 060 Benrad-Süd
- 070 Forstwald
- 080 Benrad-Nord
- 090 Hülser Berg
- 100 Traar, pop: about 5,000, postal code: 47802
- 110 Verberg
- 120 Gartenstadt
- 130 Bockum, pop: about 21.903, elevation: 35 m, postal code: 47800 (old: 4150 Krefeld 1)
- 140 Linn

Linn, with its own history reaching to between 1090 and 1120, was situated on the banks of the Rhine. In Linn, there is a park built around a Wasserburg, a castle built at the water's edge, and with a water-filled moat. The Burg Linn, as the castle is known, has been preserved for the city's residents as a park and museum.

- 150 Gellep-Stratum
- 160 Oppum postal code: 47809
- 170 Fischeln postal code: 47807
- 180 Uerdingen, pop: about 18,507, elevation: 31 m, postal code: 47829
- 190 Hüls

==== Municipal absorptions ====
Cities and places that were incorporated into Krefeld:

- 1901: Linn (Stadtrecht since 1314)
- 1907: Bockum, Verberg und Oppum (all mayoralty Bockum)
- 1929:
  - Krefeld became an independent city
  - Uerdingen, Krefeld (received municipal law in 1255/1344, added Hohenbudberg in today's Duisburg district Friemersheim)
  - Fischeln, Krefeld district
  - Traar, Krefeld district
  - Gellep and Stratum (in Lank), Krefeld district
  - Forstwald (Vorst), Krefeld district
  - Benrad und Hülserberg (Hüls), Kempen
- 1975: Locality of Hüls from Kempen (since 1970 integrated and belonged since 1929 to the Kempen-Krefeld district; in 1936 Orbroich had been independent)

== Culture ==
=== Local dialect ===
Krefeld's residents now speak Hochdeutsch, or standard German, but the native dialect is a Low Franconian variety, sometimes locally called Krefelder Platt, Krieewelsch Platt, or sometimes simply Platt. The Uerdingen line isogloss, separating general dialectical areas in Germany and neighboring Germanic-speaking countries, runs through and is named after Krefeld's Uerdingen district, originally an independent municipality.

== Points of interest ==
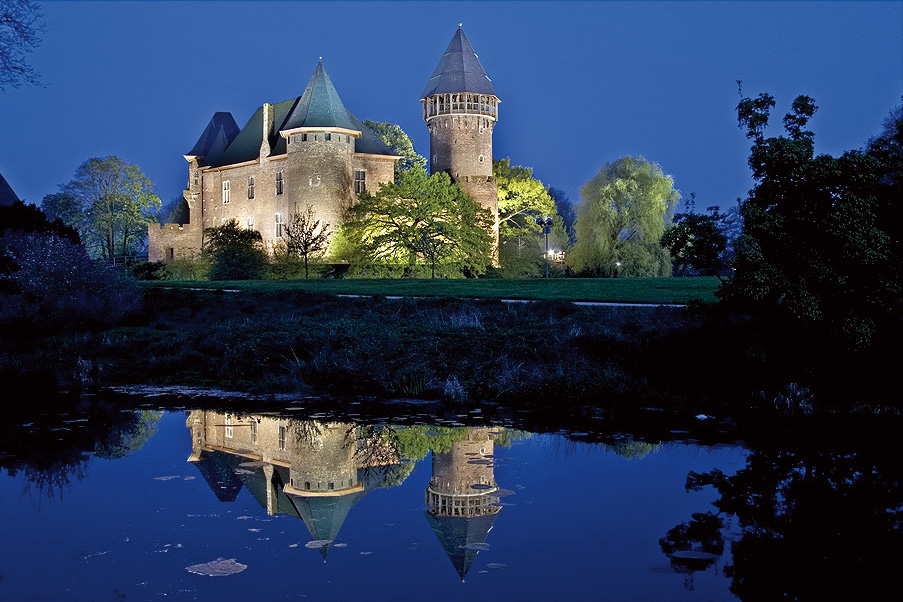
Linn Castle at night

- Linn Castle (German)
- Botanischer Garten Krefeld, a municipal botanical garden
- Krefeld Zoo
- Lange and Esters Houses, neighbouring houses by early Mies van der Rohe, now serving as local contemporary art museum venues
- Kaiser Wilhelm Museum, contemporary art museum
- German Textile Museum
- Galopprennbahn Krefeld, horse racing track
- The well-preserved historic old towns of the formerly independent districts Uerdingen, Linn and Hüls
- Krefeld-Uerdingen Bridge, the only bridge to cross the Rhine in Krefeld

== Demographics ==
Historical population

Year	Pop.	±% p.a.
1604	350	—
1722	1,499	+1.24%
1787	7,896	+2.59%
1830	18,511	+2.00%
1871	57,105	+2.79%
1875	62,905	+2.45%
1880	73,872	+3.27%
1890	105,376	+3.62%
1895	107,245	+0.35%
1900	106,928	−0.06%
1905	110,344	+0.63%
1910	129,406	+3.24%
1919	124,325	−0.44%
1925	131,098	+0.89%
1933	165,305	+2.94%
1939	170,968	+0.56%

Year	Pop.	±% p.a.
1950	171,875	+0.05%
1961	213,104	+1.97%
1965	232,710	+2.22%
1970	235,806	+0.26%
1975	228,563	−0.62%
1980	223,992	−0.40%
1985	216,944	−0.64%
1990	244,020	+2.38%
1995	249,606	+0.45%
2000	239,916	−0.79%
2005	237,701	−0.19%
2010	235,076	−0.22%
2015	225,144	−0.86%
2020	226,844	+0.15%
2025	230,738	+0.34%

Population size may be affected by changes in administrative divisions. Source: Landesdatabank Nordrhein-Westfalen (1965-2025)

Largest migrant communities in Krefeld by 31.12.2017 are

Turkey	7,805
Poland	4,510
Italy	2,610
Syria	2,530
Romania	2,225
Greece	1,942
Serbia	1,386
Netherlands	1,036
Portugal	872
Ukraine	740

== Politics ==
=== Mayor ===
The current mayor of Krefeld is Frank Meyer of the Social Democratic Party (SPD), elected in 2015 and re-elected in 2020. The most recent mayoral election was held on 13 September 2020, with a runoff held on 27 September, and the results were as follows:

Candidate	Party	First round		Second round	
Candidate	Party	Votes	%	Votes	%
Frank Meyer	Social Democratic Party	36,025	43.4	37,125	62.4
Kerstin Jensen	Christian Democratic Union	22,901	27.6	22,366	37.6
Thorsten Hansen	Alliance 90/The Greens	12,778	15.4		
Martin Vincentz	Alternative for Germany	4,186	5.0		
Joachim C. Heitmann	Free Democratic Party	3,578	4.3		
Richard Jansen	Die PARTEI	1,551	1.9		
Salih Tahusoglu	We Make Krefeld	1,047	1.3		
Andreas Drabben	Independent Voters' Association/Free Voters	783	0.9		
Peter Lommes	German Communist Party	207	0.2		
Valid votes		83,056	98.8	59,491	99.0
Invalid votes		990	1.2	612	1.0
Total		84,046	100.0	60,103	100.0
Electorate/voter turnout		180,496	46.6	180,256	33.3
Source: State Returning Officer

The following is a list of mayors of Krefeld from 1848:

- 1848–1872: Ludwig Heinrich Ondereyck
- 1872–1881: Friedrich Christian Roos
- 1882–1903: Ernst Küper
- 1903–1905: Wilhelm Hammerschmidt
- 1905–1911: Adalbert Oehler
- 1911–1930: Johannes Johansen
- 1945–1946: Johannes Stepkes
- 1946–1947: Wilhelm Warsch
- 1947–1949: Hermann Passen
- 1949–1951: Hanns Müller (FDP)
- 1951–1956: Johannes Hauser (CDU)
- 1956–1961: Josef Hellenbrock (SPD)
- 1961–1968: Herbert van Hüllen (CDU)
- 1968–1982: Hansheinz Hauser (CDU)
- 1982–1989: Dieter Pützhofen, first term in office (CDU)
- 1989–1994: Willi Wahl (SPD)
- 1994–2004: Dieter Pützhofen, second term in office (CDU)
- 2004–2015: Gregor Kathstede (CDU)
- 2015–present: Frank Meyer (SPD)

The following is a list of city counsellors from 1946 until 1999:

- 1946–1949: Johan Stepkes
- 1949–1964: Bernhard Heun
- 1964–1986: Hermann Steffens
- 1986–1988: Alfred Dahlmann
- 1988–1999: Heinz-Josef Vogt

=== City council ===
Results of the 2020 city council election

The Krefeld city council governs the city alongside the mayor. The most recent city council election was held on 13 September 2020, and the results were as follows:

Party	Votes	%	+/-	Seats	+/-
Christian Democratic Union (CDU)	24,977	30.2	▼3.4	17	▼3
Social Democratic Party (SPD)	23,599	28.6	▼6.1	17	▼3
Alliance 90/The Greens (Grüne)	16,662	20.2	▲9.0	12	▲6
Free Democratic Party (FDP)	4,834	5.9	▼0.5	3	▼1
Alternative for Germany (AfD)	4,476	5.4	▲1.2	3	▲1
The Left (Die Linke)	2,664	3.2	▼1.4	2	▼1
Die PARTEI (PARTEI)	2,031	2.5	▲1.3	1	±0
We Make Krefeld (WIR)	1,200	1.5	New	1	New
Independent Voters' Association/Free Voters (UWG/FW)	1,023	1.2	▼0.5	1	±0
Voters' Association Our Future (WUZ)	842	1.0	New	1	New
Independents	267	0.3	–	0	–
German Communist Party (DKP)	7	0.0	New	0	New
Valid votes	82,582	98.5			
Invalid votes	1,216	1.5			
Total	83,798	100.0		58	±0
Electorate/voter turnout	180,491	46.4	▲1.2		
Source: State Returning Officer

== Transport ==
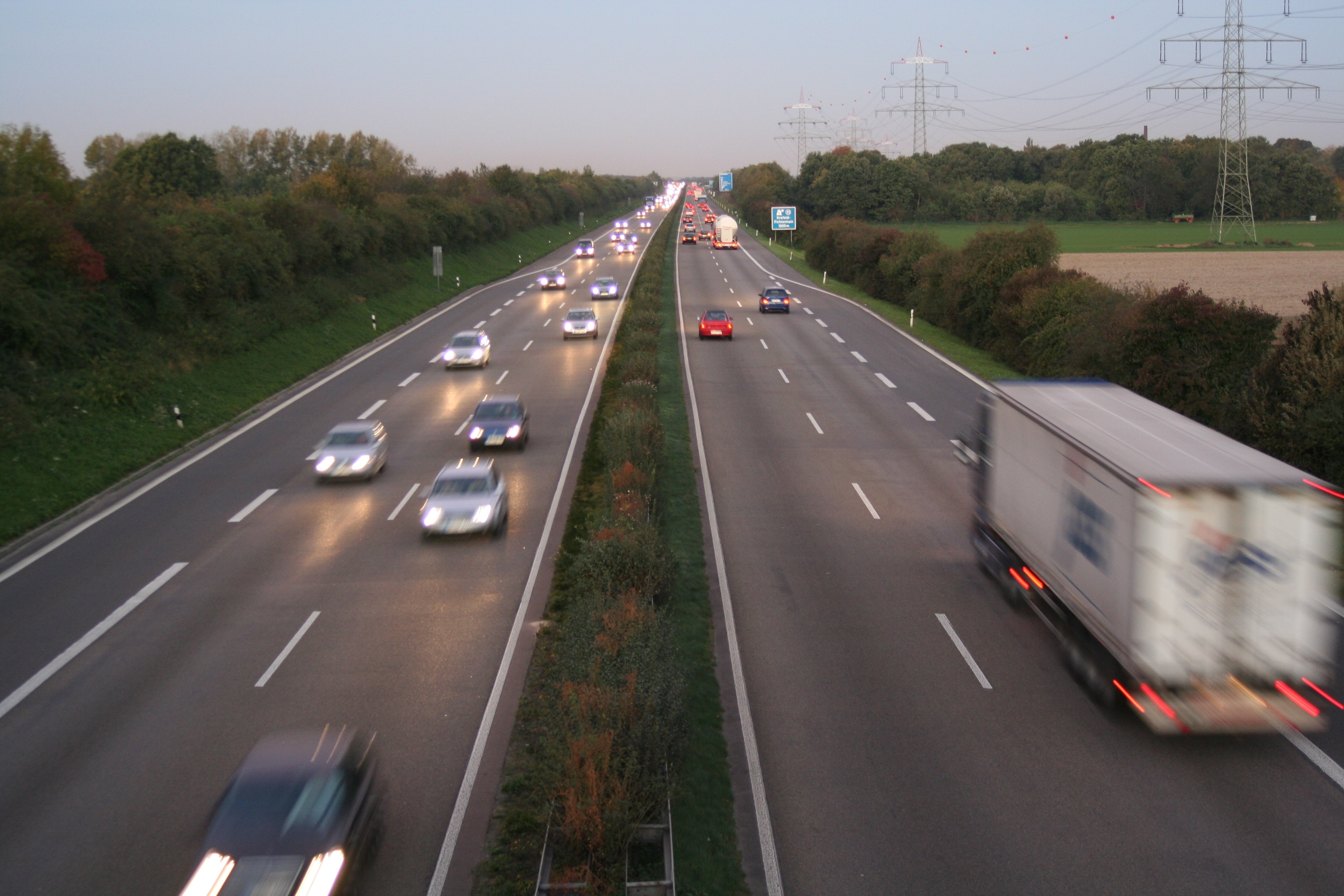
Bundesautobahn 44 towards Mönchengladbach

Krefeld is connected to the Deutsche Bahn network with several stations, including its main station, Krefeld Hauptbahnhof. They are served by Intercity, Regional-Express and Regionalbahn trains. The Düsseldorf-based Rheinbahn operates a Stadtbahn service to the centrally located Rheinstraße stop. This line was the first electric inter-city rail line in Europe, established in 1898, and commonly called the K-Bahn because of the letter "K" used to denote the trains to Krefeld. Nowadays, in the VRR notation, it is called U76, with the morning and afternoon express trains numbered as U70, the line number there coloured red instead of the usual blue used for U-Bahn lines. The term K-Bahn, however, prevails in common usage.

The city of Krefeld itself operates four tramway and several bus lines under the umbrella of SWK MOBIL, a city-owned company. Since 2010, 19 of the oldest trams of the type Duewag GT8 were replaced by modern accessible low-floor trams of the type Bombardier Flexity Outlook. SWK Mobil owns an option to buy another 19 trams of the same type to replace the last 19 Duewag M8 trams. The whole tram fleet will then be accessible to persons with disabilities. The city also plans to extend the line 044 in Krefeld-Hüls to connect the northern district of Hüls with the Krefeld downtown area.

== Economy ==
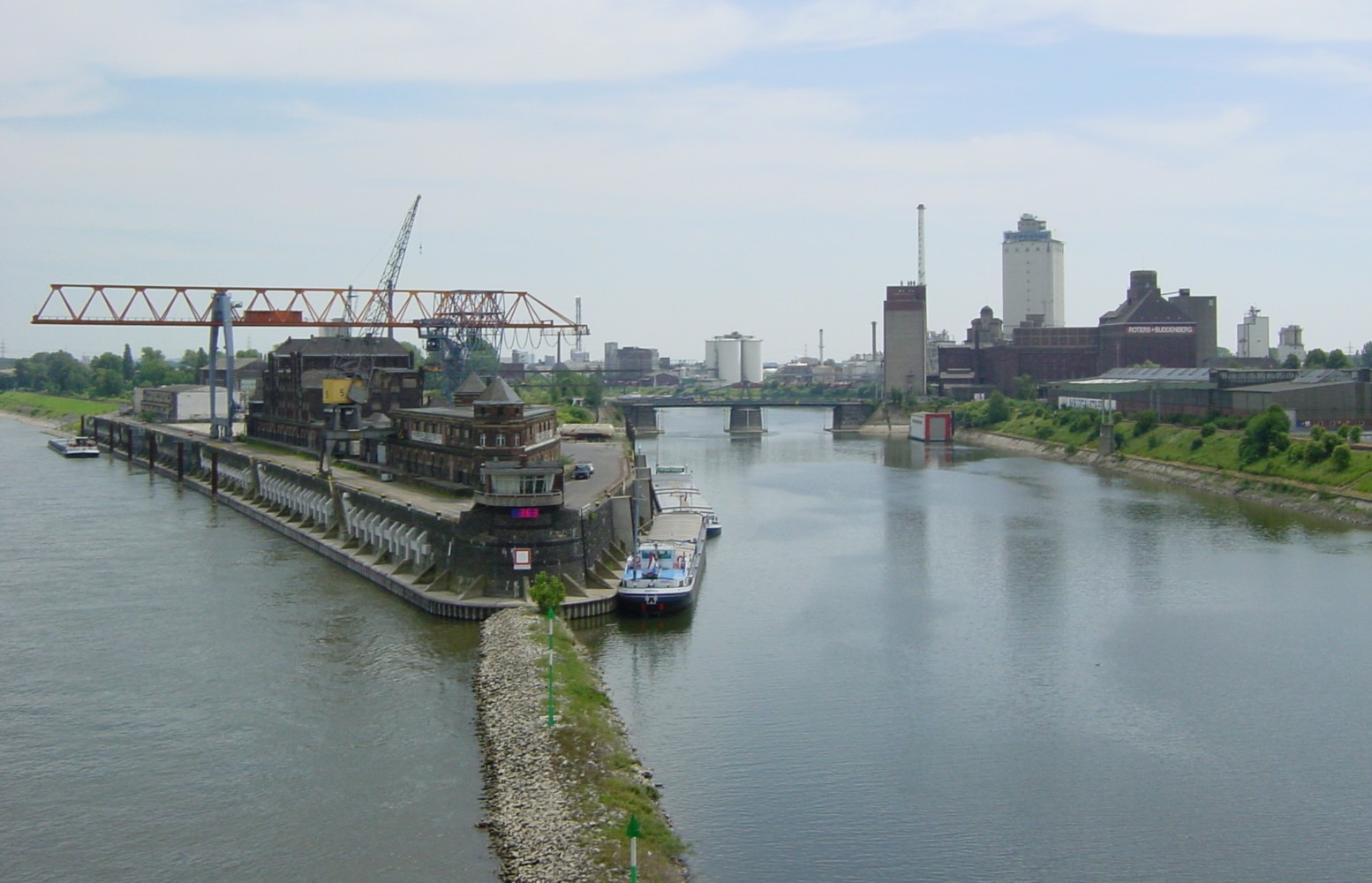
Rheinhafen Krefeld

Historically known as the "City of Velvet and Silk" (German: Samt- und Seidenstadt), Krefeld became an important centre of silk and velvet production during the 18th century.

Manufacturing remains an important part of Krefeld's economy. In 2021, more than 20,000 people were employed in manufacturing in the city. The chemical industry is particularly significant, with the former Bayer site in Uerdingen now forming part of CHEMPARK. Companies including Covestro operate production facilities there.

The service sector is the largest employment sector in Krefeld. In 2021, trade, hospitality and transport employed 24,000 people, while a further 45,800 people worked in "other services".

Krefeld's location in the Rhine-Ruhr metropolitan region and its Rhine port support its role as a logistics location. The Rheinhafen Krefeld provides connections to the European inland waterway network and North Sea ports, with road and rail links supporting freight transport. It is the fourth largest inland port in North Rhine-Westphalia.

Hochschule Niederrhein's Krefeld campuses include faculties in engineering, chemistry and design, while textile and clothing technology is based at the university's Mönchengladbach campus.

The (German) headquarters of Hitachi, Canon, Siempelkamp and Fressnapf, a pet food retailer franchise company, are situated in Krefeld.

The Nirosta steelworks, once owned by ThyssenKrupp, was sold in 2012 to Outokumpu.

== International relations ==
Since 1964, the city has hosted an "honors program in foreign language (German) studies" for high school students from Indiana, United States. The program annually places approximately thirty carefully selected high school juniors with families in and around Krefeld for intensive German language training. Since 1973, the fire services of Krefeld and twin city Leicester have played each other in an annual 'friendly' football match.

=== Twin towns – sister cities ===
Krefeld is twinned with:

- Venlo, Netherlands (1964)
- Leicester, England, United Kingdom (1969)
- Dunkirk, France (1974)
- Leiden, Netherlands (1974)
- Charlotte, United States (1986)
- Oder-Spree (district), Germany (1990)
- Ulyanovsk, Russia (1993) - put on hold since 2022 due to the Russian invasion of Ukraine
- Kayseri, Turkey (2009)
- Kropyvnytskyi, Ukraine (2023)

== Notable people ==
=== Scientists and academics ===
- Charlotte Auerbach (1899–1994) – genetic scientist
- Edmund ter Meer (1859–1931) – chemist and industrialist
- Felix Kracht (1912–2002) – aerospace engineer, an Airbus pioneer and former Senior Vice President
- Fritz ter Meer (1884–1967) – chemist and industrialist
- Leopold Löwenheim (1878–1957) – logician
- Herta Wescher (1899–1971), art historian and art critic
- Max Zorn (1906–1993) – mathematician
- Rudi Dornbusch (1942–2002) – economist
- Kate Wallach (1905-1979)

=== Writers, poets and journalists ===
- Bernhard Hennen (born 1966) – writer of fantasy literature
- Bodo Hauser (1946–2004) – journalist and writer
- Erol Yesilkaya (born 1976) – Turkish-German screenwriter
- Johannes Floehr (born 1991) – author and comedian
- Kurt Feltz (1910–1982) – poet
- Margarethe Schreinemakers (born 1958) – television presenter and journalist

=== Musicians ===
- Albert Dohmen (born 1956) – opera singer
- Andrea Berg (born 1966) – singer
- Blind Guardian (1984-) – Power Metal band
- Engin Nurşani (1984–2020) – folk musician
- Heinrich Band (1821–1860) – inventor of the bandoneón
- Maria Madlen Madsen (1905–1990) – opera singer
- Ralf Hütter (born 1946) – leader of electronic music pioneers Kraftwerk
- Saki Kaskas (1971–2016) – Greek-Canadian video game music composer
- Claus Terhoeven (born 1972) – member of trance music duo Cosmic Gate
- Stefan Bossems (born 1967) – member of trance music duo Cosmic Gate

=== Visual artists ===
- Albert Oehlen (born 1954) – artist
- Charles J. Kleingrothe (1864–1925) – photographer
- Heinrich Campendonk (1889–1957) – German-Dutch painter and graphic designer
- Johan Thorn Prikker (1868–1932) – Dutch artist
- Johannes Itten (1888–1967) – Swiss expressionist painter, designer, teacher, writer and theorist
- Joseph Beuys (1921–1986) – artist
- Markus Oehlen (born 1956) – artist
- Theo Akkermann (1907–1982) – sculptor

=== Sportspeople ===
- Jochen Neerpasch (born 1939) – racing driver
- Friedhelm Funkel (born 1953) – football manager and player
- Juliane Schenk (born 1982) – German badminton player
- Martin Hyun (born 1979) – German-American ice hockey player and author
- Philip Hindes (born 1992) – British sprint cyclist
- Werner Rittberger (1891–1975) – figure skater
- Marc Schaub (born 1992) – professional ice hockey player
- Nicole Anyomi (born 2000) – football player

=== Businessmen ===
- Ben Neumann (1966–2020) – American entrepreneur and film producer
- Edmund ter Meer (1859–1931) – chemist and industrialist
- Felix Kracht (1912–2002) – aerospace engineer, an Airbus pioneer and former Senior Vice President
- Fritz ter Meer (1884–1967) – chemist and industrialist
- Thierry Hermès (1801–1878) – French businessman and founder of Hermès

=== Military personnel ===
- Emil Schäfer (1891–1917) – World War I aviator
- Heinz Harmel (1906–2000) – SS commander, Knight's Cross Holder
- Werner Voss (1897–1917) – World War I aviator

=== Politicians ===
- Jürgen Lenders (born 1966), politician (FDP)

=== Mennonites ===
- Herman op den Graeff (1585-1642), born in Aldekerk; Mennonite community leader from Krefeld, in 1632 delegate to sign the Dordrecht Confession of Faith
- Abraham op den Graeff (1646-1731), grandchild of the previous one, born in Krefeld; original founder of Germantown, Pennsylvania, member of the Pennsylvania Provincial Assembly and in 1688 signer of the first organized religious protest against slavery in colonial America
