= Hüls (Krefeld) =

- Stadtteil of Krefeld
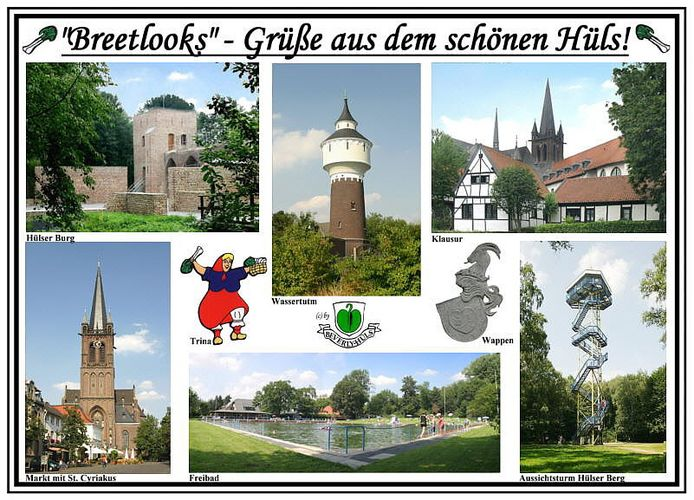
- Collage of Hüls

- Coat of arms
- Interactive map of Hüls
- Location within Germany Location within North Rhine-Westphalia
- Coordinates: 51°22′20″N 6°30′40″E
- Country: Germany
- State: North Rhine-Westphalia
- Admin. region: Düsseldorf
- District: Urban district
- City: Krefeld

Area
  - Total: 26.08 km^{2} (10.07 sq mi)

Population (2019-12-31)
  - Total: 16,378
  - Density: 628.0/km^{2} (1,626/sq mi)
- Time zone: UTC+01:00 (CET)
  - Summer (DST): UTC+02:00 (CEST)
- Vehicle registration: KR

Hüls is the most northerly district of Krefeld, North Rhine-Westphalia, Germany. Formerly an independent municipality, Hüls has been part of the city of Krefeld since 1975. It was the site of damask and velvet manufacturing. Including the small district of Hülserberg, it covers 26.08 km^{2} (10.07 sq mi) and has 16,378 inhabitants (2019).

== History ==
Stone Age and Roman Time

A few flint artifacts from the Neolithic (5500 - 2000 BC) are proof of human activity on the territory of what is now Hüls. A few graves from the Iron Age have been discovered near what is now Botzweg.
