= Krefeld-Linn =

Linn
- Stadtteil of Krefeld
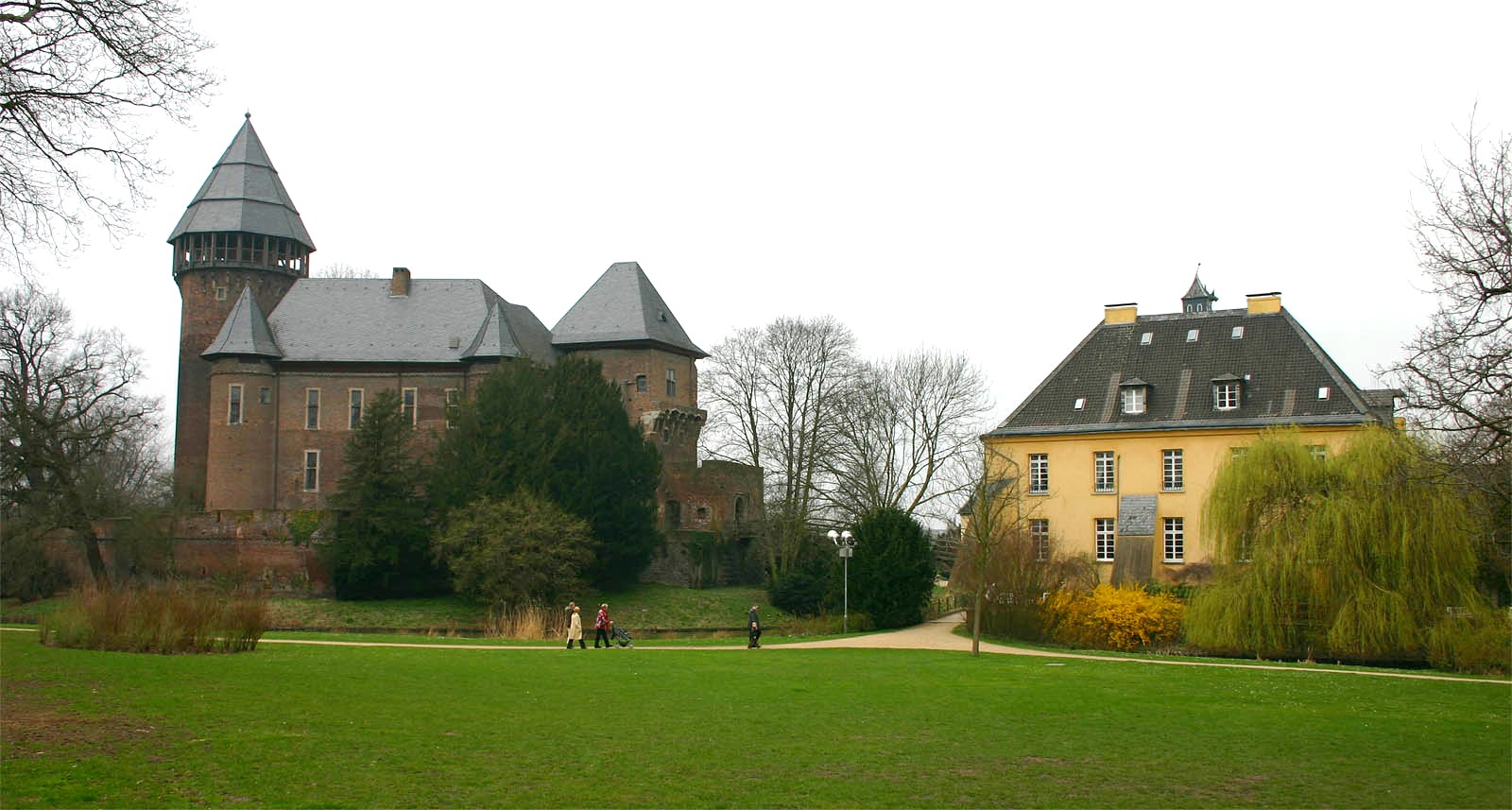
- Burg Linn
- Interactive map of Linn
- Location within Germany Location within North Rhine-Westphalia
- Coordinates: 51°20′02″N 6°38′13″E
- Country: Germany
- State: North Rhine-Westphalia
- Admin. region: Düsseldorf
- District: Urban district
- City: Krefeld

Area
  - Total: 7.58 km^{2} (2.93 sq mi)

Population (2019-12-31)
  - Total: 5,911
  - Density: 780/km^{2} (2,020/sq mi)
- Time zone: UTC+01:00 (CET)
  - Summer (DST): UTC+02:00 (CEST)
- Vehicle registration: KR

Linn has been a part of the city of Krefeld, Germany, since its incorporation into that city in 1901. Linn lies with its historic city center within the lower Rhenish lowlands about 5 km (3.1 mi) east of the Krefeld city center. Krefeld-Linn station is served by the Rhein-Niers-Bahn and the Emscher-Niederrhein-Bahn Regionalbahn services.

The place known as Linn was first mentioned in an Imperial document composed between 1090, and 1120. By the beginning of the fourteenth century, Linn must have been raised to the status of a city, as in another document in 1314, city jurors were named.

Particularly worth seeing in Linn are the Burg Linn (Linn Castle), a Wasserburg—a castle on the Rhine surrounded by a water-filled moat—construction on which began in the twelfth century, along with the layout of its fortifications and parkland; the Jagdschloß (hunting lodge) located on the grounds of the Burg Linn; the Greiffenhorst-Schlösschen (Greiffenhorst Mansion); the Deutsche Textilmuseum (German Textile Museum); as well as the Lower Rhine Landschaftsmuseum which belongs to the Museumszentrum Burg Linn (Museum Center of Burg Linn).

Linn was spared destruction through both world wars. Nearly the entire Linn city center stands today subject to historic preservation.

Every year during the Pentecost or Whitsuntide weekend, the flax market is held near Burg Linn. The market for handmade goods attracts visitors to Linn and the surrounding region of Krefeld.
