= Gellep-Stratum =

- Stadtteil of Krefeld
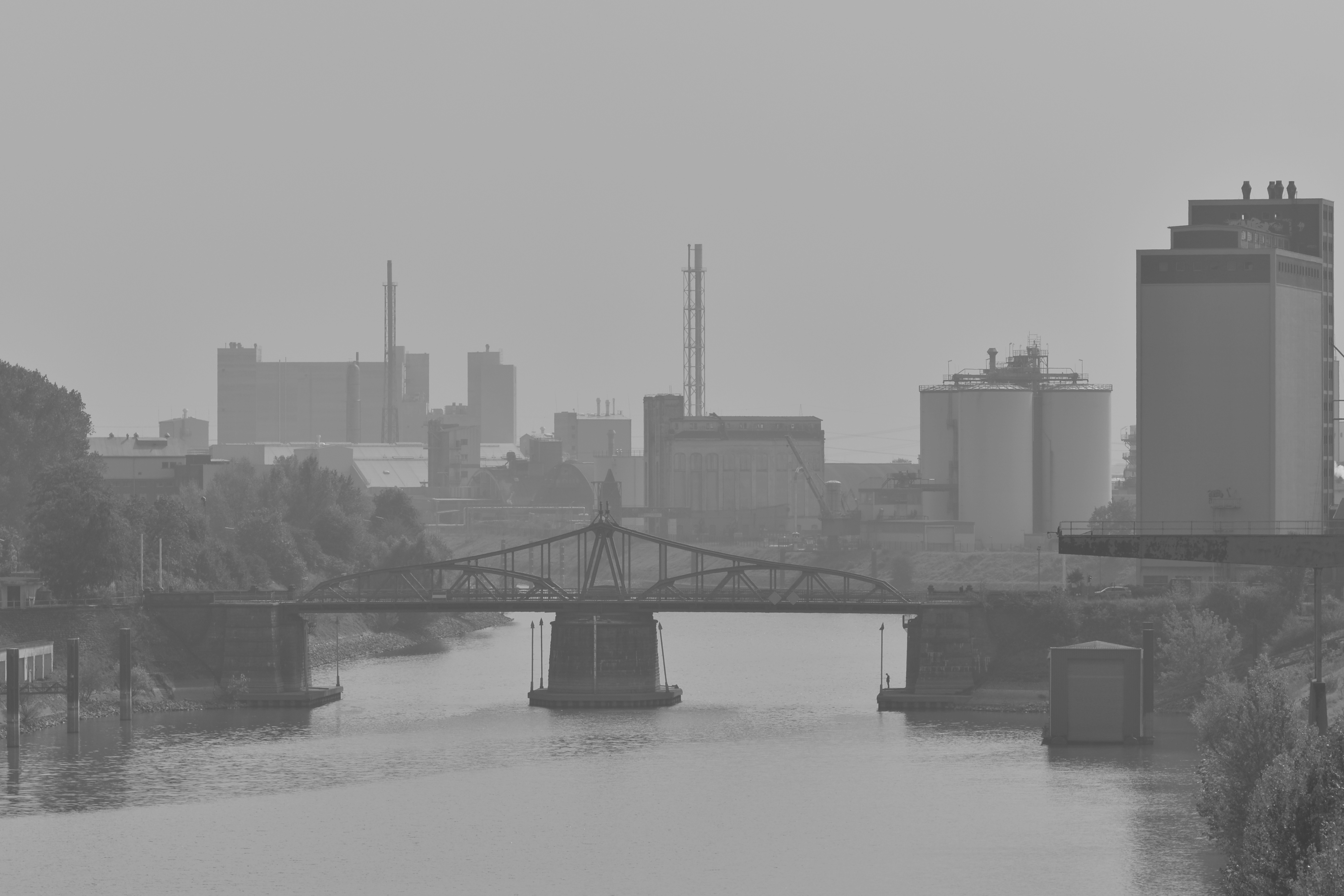
- Rheinhafen
- Interactive map of Gellep-Stratum
- Location within Germany Location within North Rhine-Westphalia
- Coordinates: 51°19′40″N 6°40′16″E
- Country: Germany
- State: North Rhine-Westphalia
- Admin. region: Düsseldorf
- District: Urban district
- City: Krefeld

Area
  - Total: 8.89 km^{2} (3.43 sq mi)

Population (2021-12-31)
  - Total: 2,485
  - Density: 280/km^{2} (724/sq mi)
- Time zone: UTC+01:00 (CET)
  - Summer (DST): UTC+02:00 (CEST)
- Vehicle registration: KR

Gellep-Stratum is the southeasternmost district of Krefeld. The population is 2,485 (as of December 31, 2021). Until its incorporation into the city of Krefeld in 1929, Gellep-Stratum was a municipality in the Amt Lank of the Krefeld district.

== Archaeology and history ==
=== Gelduba ===
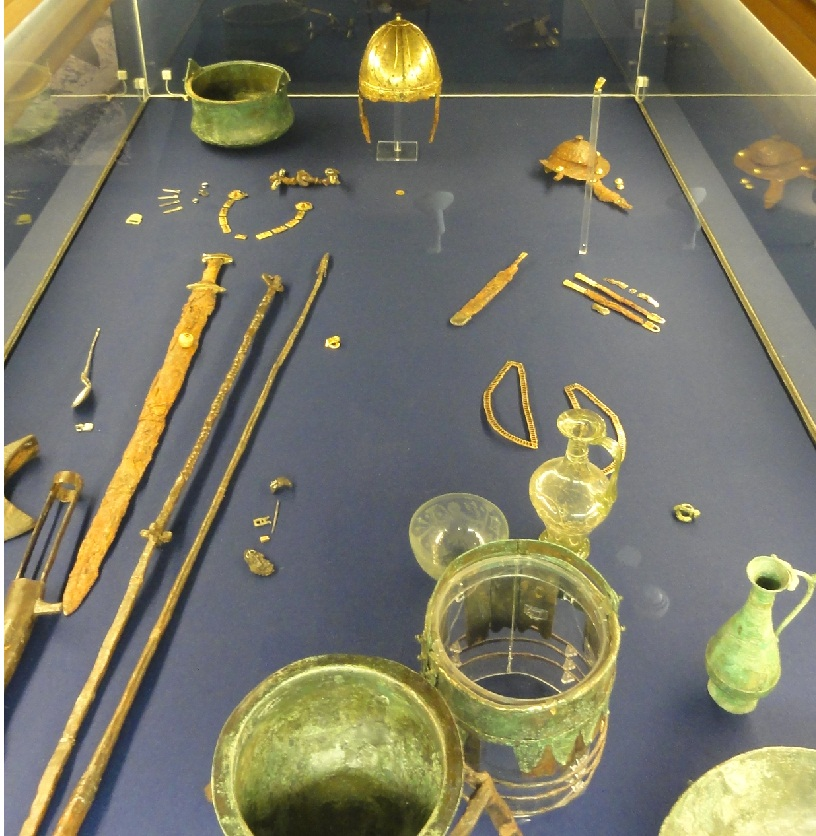
Frankish grave of Arpvar with its golden Spangenhelm

In the southeast of present-day Krefeld, there are two ancient settlement cores. The one closer to the Rhine is Gelduba/Gellep. Here, the Romans built the fort Gelduba in the late 1st century AD near an Ubian village. Imperial troops used the fort until at least the middle of the 5th century AD. After the Roman period, the Franks settled in the area. Albert Steeger discovered two cemeteries in 1937 ("Gellep-West" and the southern "Gellep-East") with Roman and Frankish graves. Gellep-West is the smaller and older of the two early medieval burial sites and is directly adjacent to the large Roman military cemetery. The cemetery was in use until the early 8th century. The nearby Gellep-East cemetery, though distinctly separate, dates back to around 535 AD, with a "prince's grave field" containing the grave of the Frankish prince Arpvar, who was buried with rich gold jewelry and a golden Spangenhelm. The settlement in Gellep likely continued in the fort, used by the Franks, as indicated by the discovery of a Frankish pottery kiln and a coin find. After the Merovingians, this settlement in Gellep declined, although the current village part of Gellep has existed since the Middle Ages, with buildings and farms established on the former fort site and its vicinity.

=== Stratum ===
West of Gelduba lay another early medieval settlement, whose medieval successor is the present-day Stratum. Here, Albert Steeger discovered and excavated an early medieval cemetery, with about 200 known graves. Notably, the cemetery contains cremation graves and north–south oriented burials, which were unusual for the region. In 1979/80, parts of the associated settlement were excavated in the field "Puppenburg".

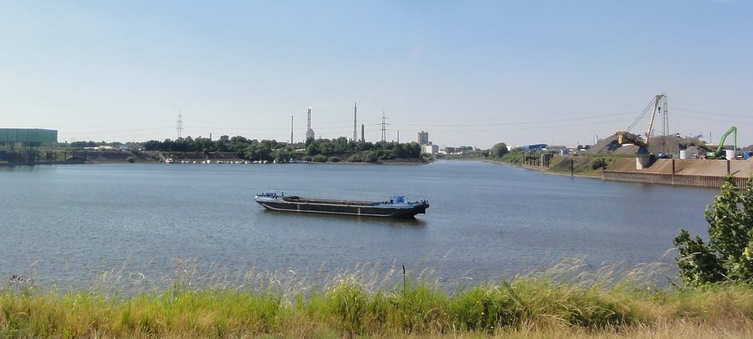
Turning basin of the Krefeld Rhine port, covering large parts of the Roman/Frankish Archaeological Monument.

Finds from Gellep and Stratum are now on display at the Lower Rhine Landscape Museum in the Burg Linn Museum Center.

=== Middle Ages ===
In 904 and 910, Gellep appears in documents from the Kaiserswerth Abbey. Stratum is first mentioned in 1230 as Stratheim.

From 1392 to 1794, Gellep and Stratum belonged to the Electoral Cologne Amt Linn.

=== Modern Era ===
In 1906, the Krefeld Rhine port was built and put into operation in Linn. The later expansion of the port now extends to Gellep, where today the turning basin of the port covers large parts of the former Roman village (vicus) and the Roman/Frankish cemetery.
