= Krefeld-Linn station =

Railway station in Krefeld, Germany

Krefeld Linn
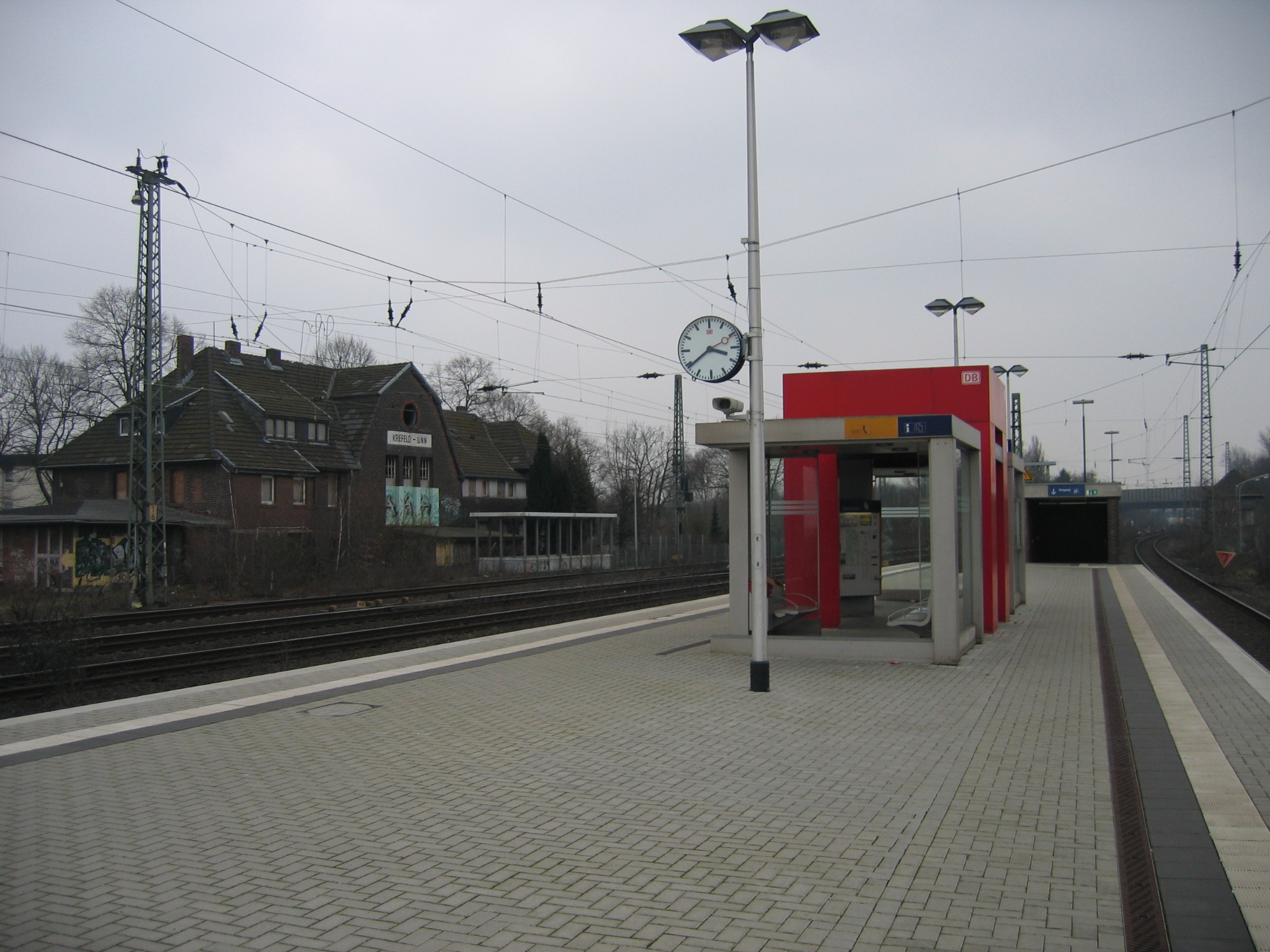
- Platform with station building (out of use, February 2008)

General information
- Location: Linner Platz 1, Linn, Krefeld, NRW; Germany
- Coordinates: 51°20′16″N 6°37′48″E
- Lines: Mönchengladbach-Duisburg (km 90.4); Osterath–Dortmund Süd (KBS 490; km 6,0)
- Platforms: 2

Construction
- Accessible: No

Other information
- Station code: 3404
- DS100 code: KKRL
- IBNR: 8003426
- Category: 5
- Fare zone: VRR: 324
- Website: www.bahnhof.de

History
- Opened: 15 October 1874
- Former names: Linn; Crefeld-Linn

Services
Preceding station	DB Regio NRW	Following station
Krefeld-Oppum towards Aachen Hbf	RB 33	Krefeld-Uerdingen towards Essen-Steele
Preceding station	VIAS	Following station
Krefeld-Oppum towards Mönchengladbach Hbf	RB 35	Krefeld-Uerdingen towards Gelsenkirchen Hbf
Location

Krefeld-Linn station is a regional station in the district of Linn in the city of Krefeld in the German state of North Rhine-Westphalia. It lies on the Osterath–Essen railway; the Rhenish Railway Company (Rheinische Eisenbahn-Gesellschaft) gained a concession to build the line on 16 July 1863. The line was opened on 1 September 1866, with the stations not yet finished. Linn station was opened on 15 October 1874 and the first entrance building was also put into operation at this time. The station name was changed to Crefeld-Linn in 1905 and Krefeld-Linn in 1925. This name still applies today.

A new entrance building opened in Linn in 1907, which is still preserved (the old one was demolished in 1912). It has not been used for more than 20 years and is in a stage of advanced decay.

== Rail services ==
The station is on the Duisburg–Mönchengladbach railway and is only served by regional services.

Line	Name	Route	Interval
RB 33	Rhein-Niers-Bahn	Essen – Mülheim – Duisburg – Rheinhausen – Krefeld-Linn – Krefeld – Viersen – Mönchengladbach – Aachen	Hourly
RB 35	Emscher-Niederrhein-Bahn	Gelsenkirchen – Oberhausen – Duisburg – Rheinhausen – Krefeld-Linn – Krefeld – Viersen – Mönchengladbach	Hourly

== Tram service ==
A tram line stops at Krefeld-Linn station. It is operated by SWK Mobil.

Line	Route	Interval
044	Hüls – Krefeld Hbf – Rheinhafen	15 min

== Bus routes ==
The following bus routes stop at Krefeld-Linn station. They are operated by SWK Mobil.

Line	Route
047	Krefeld-Stahldorf Höffgesweg – Fischeln Rathaus – Oppum Bf – Oppum Bf Nord – Bockumer Platz – Linn – Krefeld-Gellep-Stratum
