= Krefeld-Hohenbudberg Chempark station =

Railway station in Krefeld, Germany

Krefeld Hohenbudberg Chempark
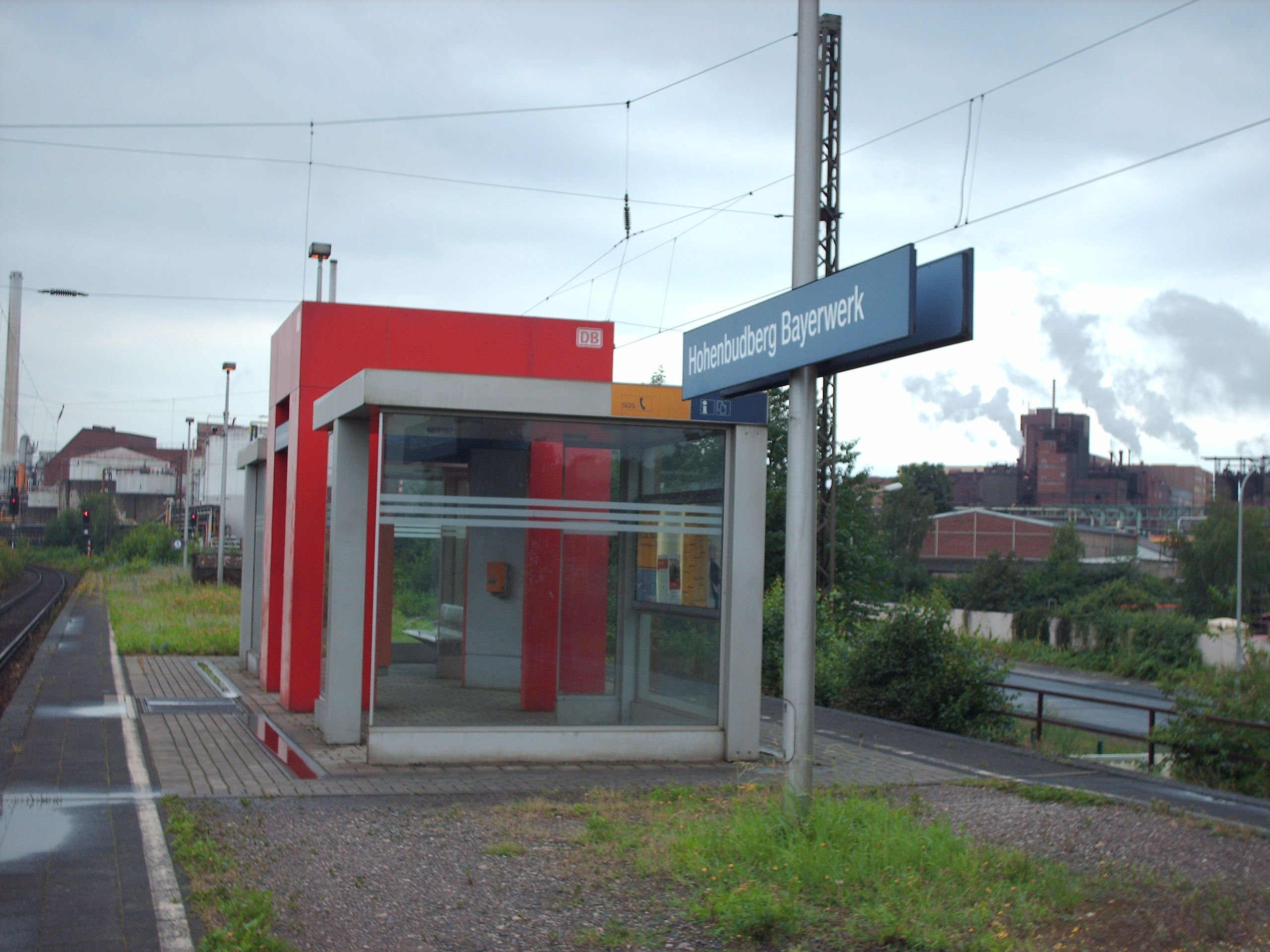
- Platform at Krefeld-Hohenbudberg Chempark station with the old name Hohenbudberg Bayerwerk

General information
- Location: Am Kreuz 1, Krefeld, NRW; Germany
- Coordinates: 51°22′23″N 6°39′50″E
- Line: Osterath–Dortmund Süd
- Platforms: 2

Construction
- Accessible: No

Other information
- Station code: 2837
- DS100 code: KHB
- IBNR: 8002941
- Category: 6
- Fare zone: VRR: 324 and 334
- Website: www.bahnhof.de

History
- Opened: 1 October 1961

Services
Preceding station	DB Regio NRW	Following station
Krefeld-Uerdingen towards Aachen Hbf	RB 33	Rheinhausen towards Essen-Steele
Preceding station	VIAS	Following station
Krefeld-Uerdingen towards Mönchengladbach Hbf	RB 35	Rheinhausen towards Gelsenkirchen Hbf
Location

Krefeld-Hohenbudberg Chempark station is a station in northern Uerdingen and near the suburb of Hohenbudberg in the city of Krefeld in the German state of North Rhine-Westphalia. It was originally called Hohenbudberg Bayerwerk and it is named after the Bayer chemical works in Hohenbudberg.

== Location and structure ==
The stop is located in the north of Uerdingen in the eastern part of the Chempark Hohenbudberg. It has an island platform.

== History ==
Bayer planned an enlargement of its plant in the area of the Krefeld-Uerdingen – Homberg branch line in 1961. Therefore, Hohenbudberg Bayerwerk station was built on the Duisburg-Ruhrort–Mönchengladbach railway for the workers at the Bayer works, replacing Hohenbudberg station on the line. In 2013, it was renamed Chempark like the other stations that included Bayerwerk (Bayer works) in their names, and the city's name Krefeld was added as a prefix.

== Transport connections ==
=== Rail services ===
The station is served by Regionalbahn services, RB33 Rhein-Niers-Bahn and RB35 Emscher-Niederrhein-Bahn. They both run hourly between Duisburg and Mönchengladbach, together providing a service every half hour. The RB33 starts from Essen and continues via Mönchengladbach to Aachen and the RB35 continues via Duisburg to Wesel.

Line	Route	Frequency
RB 33; Rhein-Niers-Bahn	Essen – Mülheim – Duisburg – Krefeld-Hohenbudberg Chempark – Krefeld – Mönchengladbach – Aachen	60 mins
RB 35; Emscher-Niederrhein-Bahn	Gelsenkirchen – Oberhausen – Duisburg – Krefeld-Hohenbudberg Chempark – Krefeld – Mönchengladbach – Aachen	60 mins

=== Public transport ===
Before the Bayer works was enlarged to the south in 2004/2005, there was a bus stop called Hohenbudberg Bayerwerk Bf next to the station on the then Friedensstraße. It was served by routes 054 and 927 of SWK Mobil, which travelled down Friedensstraße to the Uerdingen–Rumeln-Kaldenhausen connecting road and then ran to the south towards Uerdingen station and inner Krefeld and the 054 continued to Willich-Anrath. The 927 ran to the north towards Rheinhausen. When the Bayer works expanded to the south in 2004/2005, Friedenstraße had to be closed. Since then route 927 has run parallel to the railway line and 054 has stopped west of Friedensstraße. The nearest stop on the 927 is at Chempark Tor 2 (gate 2). The night route NE27 runs from Duisburg-Rheinhausen to Krefeld, but mostly end at the Chempark Tor 2 stop.

Line	Route
927	Rheinhausen Markt – Rheinhausen Bf – Rheinhausen Bf/Kaiserstraße – Friemersheim – Hohenbudberg Chempark Tor 2 – Krefeld-Uerdingen Bf – Bockumer Platz – Krefeld-Rheinstraße – Krefeld Hbf
NE27	Rheinhausen Markt – Rheinhausen Bf – Rheinhausen Bf/Kaiserstraße – Friemersheim – Hohenbudberg Chempark Tor 2 – Krefeld-Uerdingen Bf – Bockumer Platz – Krefeld-Rheinstraße – Krefeld Hbf

== See also ==
- Leverkusen Chempark station
- Dormagen Chempark station
