= Krefeld-Oppum station =

Railway station in Krefeld, Germany

Krefeld Oppum
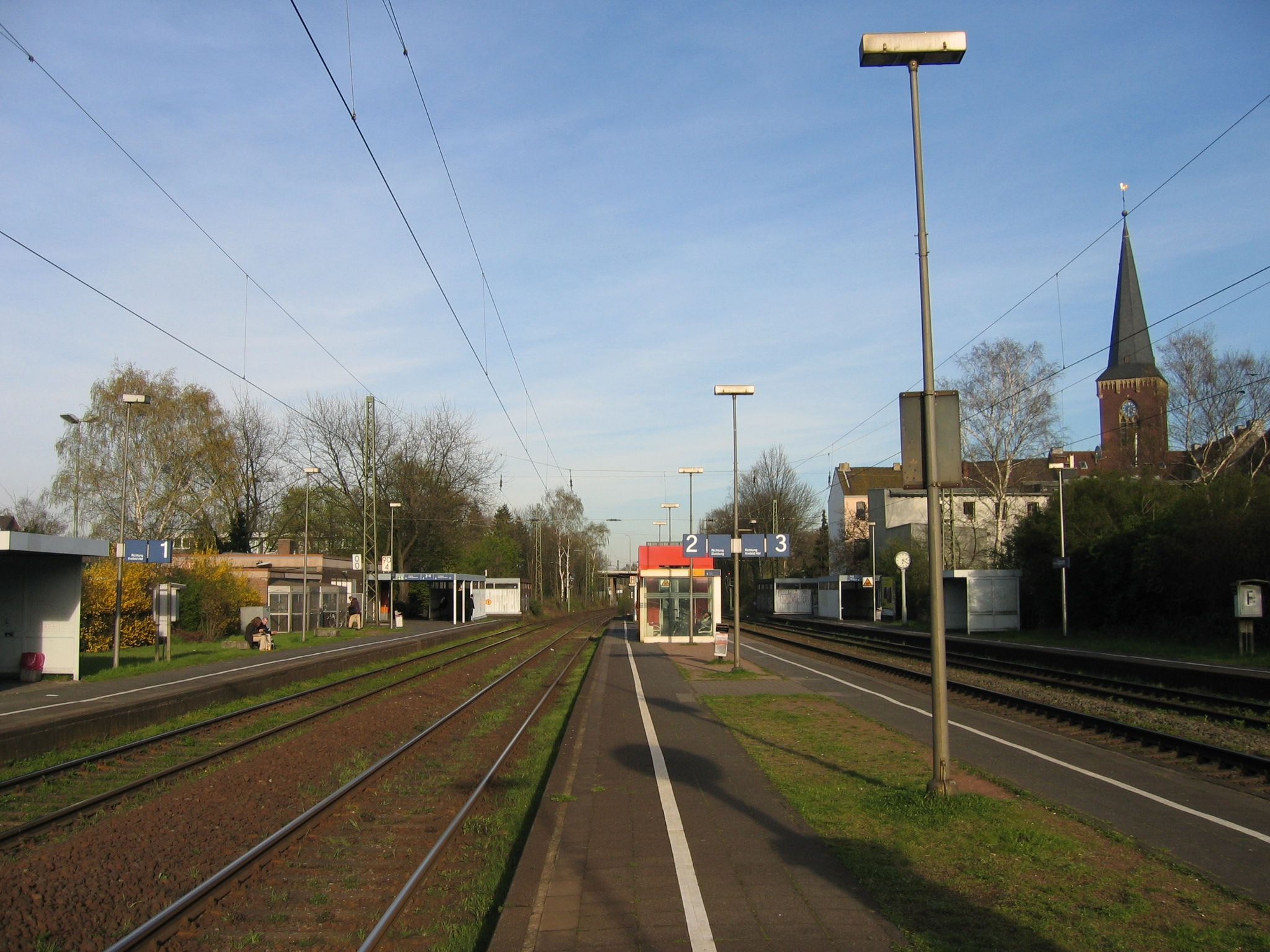
- Platforms of Krefeld-Oppum station

General information
- Location: Werkstättenstr. 83, Oppum, Krefeld, NRW; Germany
- Coordinates: 51°19′47″N 6°36′38″E
- Lines: Mönchengladbach-Duisburg (km 90.4); Osterath–Dortmund Süd (km 0.0); Lower Left Rhine Railway (km 50.5)
- Platforms: 4

Construction
- Accessible: Yes

Other information
- Station code: 3405
- DS100 code: KKRO
- IBNR: 8000212
- Category: 4
- Fare zone: VRR: 320 and 324
- Website: www.bahnhof.de

History
- Opened: 1 February 1877

Services
Preceding station	National Express Germany	Following station
Krefeld Hbf Terminus	RE 7 (Rhein-Münsterland-Express)	Meerbusch-Osterath towards Rheine
Preceding station	NordWestBahn	Following station
Krefeld Hbf towards Kleve	RE 10	Meerbusch-Osterath towards Düsseldorf Hbf
Preceding station	DB Regio NRW	Following station
Krefeld Hbf towards Aachen Hbf	RB 33	Krefeld-Linn towards Essen-Steele
Preceding station	VIAS	Following station
Krefeld Hbf towards Mönchengladbach Hbf	RB 35	Krefeld-Linn towards Gelsenkirchen Hbf
Location

Krefeld-Oppum is a station in the city of Krefeld in the German state of North Rhine-Westphalia on the Duisburg-Ruhrort–Mönchengladbach railway. It consists of a passenger station, a railway repair shop, where Intercity-Express trains are also serviced, and a former freight yard.

== History ==
The station was opened on the Duisburg-Ruhrort–Mönchengladbach railway in 1877 by the Rhenish Railway Company (Rheinische Eisenbahn-Gesellschaft). The railway repair shop was opened in 1892. The population of Oppum rose sharply with the opening of the station.

== Installations ==
=== Railway repair shop ===
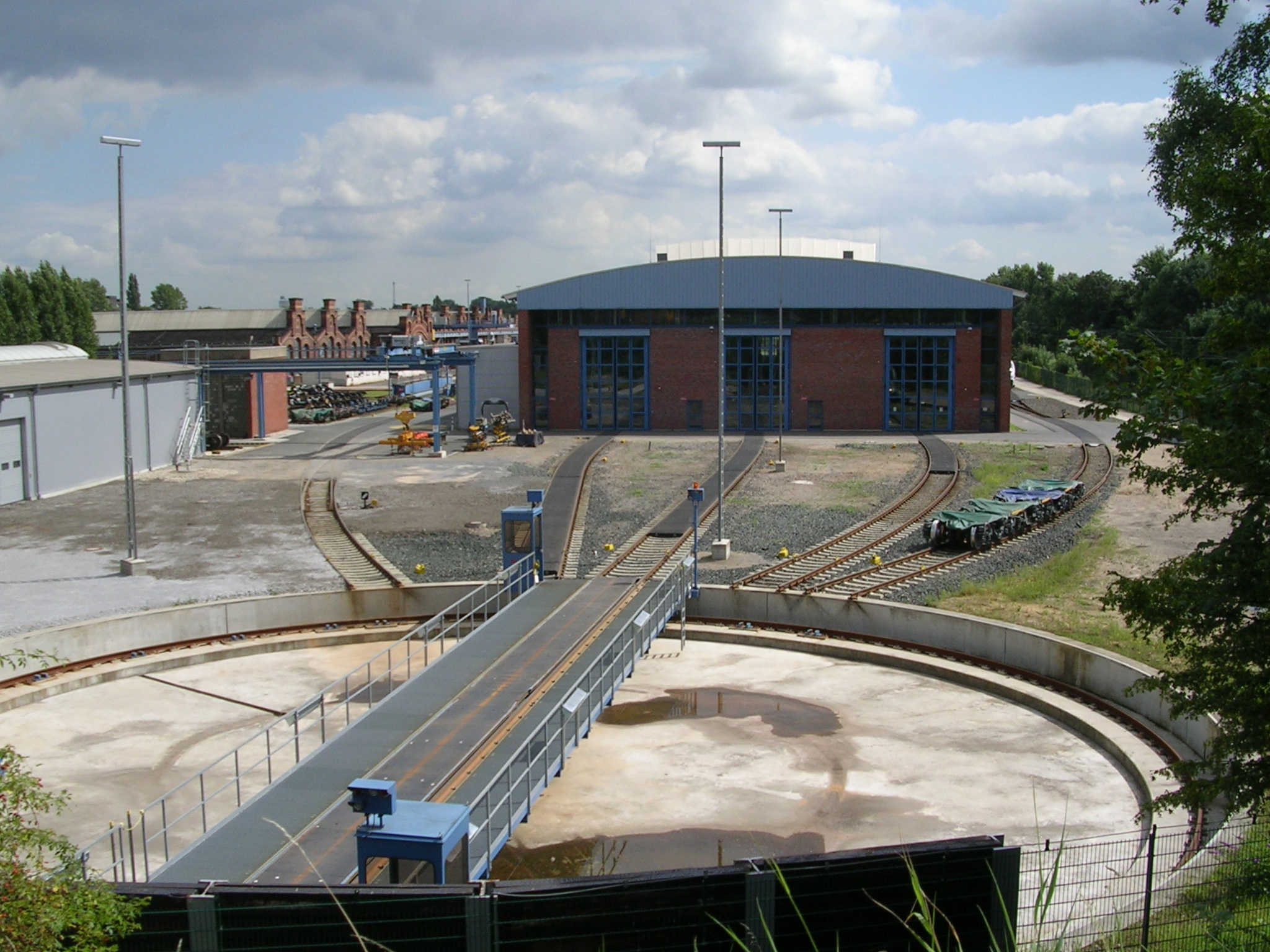
The ICE maintenance workshop

The first railway repair workshop was opened in Oppum as the Königliche Eisenbahn-Haupt-Reparaturwerkstatt Oppum, ("Royal Railway Main Repair Shop, Oppum"). Today, the Intercity-Express maintenance facility in Krefeld is a state-of-the-art facility for the maintenance of Deutsche Bahn rolling stock. A few thousand employees are employed there. ICE and electric multiple units used for regional transport are overhauled (all components of the vehicles are inspected, renewed or repaired) there. This includes servicing major items such as air conditioners, bogies and wheelsets, but also smaller parts such as shock absorbers. Several million Euros were invested in the modernisation of the plant in economic and environmental terms.

Over time, the railway repair shop has been greatly developed. In 1924 it became an Ausbesserungswerk (repair shop) and in 1955 it became the central point for dealing with the shock absorbers of passenger coaches. Since 2003, ICE trains have also been serviced there. It was renamed DB Fahrzeuginstandhaltung GmbH (DB maintenance) in 2004.

The plant is one of 15 large-scale plants in which rail rolling stock is serviced. It covers 202,000 m² and extends through four high-tech halls each with three levels; this allows all three levels of an ICE to be reached at the same time.

=== Former freight yard ===
The Krefeld-Oppum freight yard was located about 700 metres west of the passenger station in the area of the street, "Am Verschubbahnhof". It has now closed. The city of Krefeld plans to use the site as a commercial site.

=== Passenger station ===
The passenger station is now a stop on two railway lines, the Lower Left Rhine Railway (Linksniederrheinische Strecke) and the Duisburg–Mönchengladbach railway. It is only served by regional services.

Line	Name	Route	Interval
RE 7	Rhein-Münsterland-Express	Rheine – Münster – Hamm (Westf) – Hagen – Wuppertal – Solingen – Köln Messe/Deutz – Cologne – Neuss – Krefeld	60 min
RE 10	Niers-Express	Kleve – Krefeld – Düsseldorf	30 min
RB 33	Rhein-Niers-Bahn	Essen – Mülheim – Duisburg – Rheinhausen – Krefeld-Linn – Krefeld – Viersen – Mönchengladbach – Aachen	60 min
RB 35	Emscher-Niederrhein-Bahn	Gelsenkirchen – Oberhausen – Duisburg – Rheinhausen – Krefeld-Linn – Krefeld – Viersen – Mönchengladbach	60 min

Every day, 4,000 commuters arrive or depart at Oppum station. The station access runs through a tunnel under the tracks. The Oppum weekly market is held near the station.

==== Links to public transport ====
The following bus lines stop at Krefeld-Oppum station. They are operated by SWK Mobil.

Linie	Verlauf
047	Krefeld-Stahldorf Höffgesweg – Fischeln Rathaus – Oppum Bf – Oppum Bf Nord – Bockumer Platz – Linn – Krefeld-Gellep-Stratum
057	Krefeld-Inrath, Pestallozzistraße – Horkesgath – Rheinstraße – Hauptbahnhof – Oppum Bf – Meerbusch-Bösinghoven
NE6	Moers station – Moers, Königlicher Hof – Moers-Kapellen – Krefeld-Elfrath – Verberg – Rheinstraße – Hauptbahnhof – Oppum Bf – Meerbusch-Bösinghoven

==== Modification ====
The Krefeld-Oppum station was redeveloped up to 2015. The station was provided with lifts and the platforms were raised to ensure a stepless access to improve its accessibility. In addition, the station received information display boards and its appearance and its forecourt were upgraded in an urban style. The reconstruction works started on 7 April 2014.
