= Krefeld-Uerdingen station =

Railway station in Krefeld, Germany

Krefeld Uerdingen
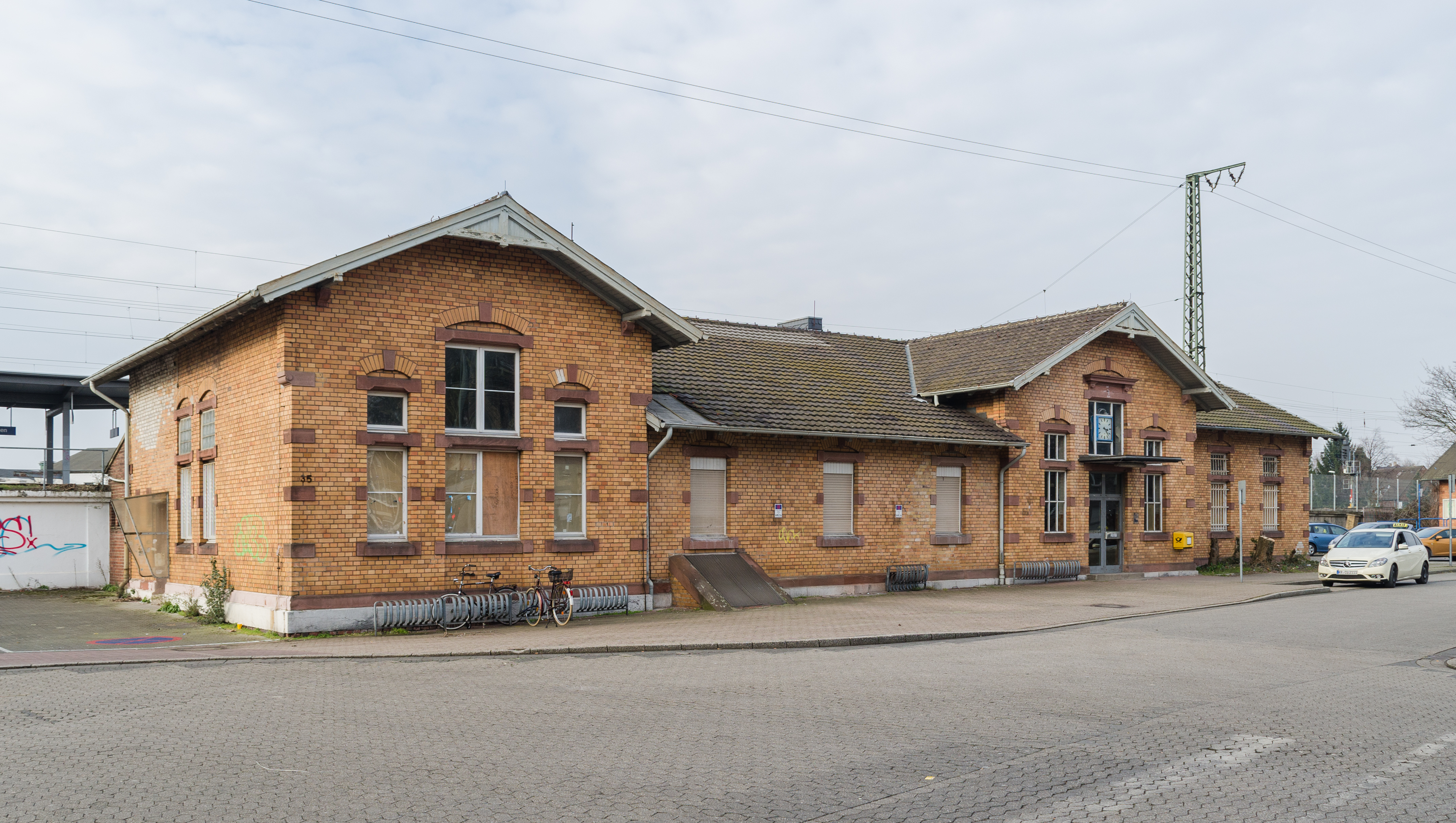
- Station building (out of use, 2018)

General information
- Location: Bahnhofstr. 35, Uerdingen, Krefeld, NRW; Germany
- Coordinates: 51°21′27″N 6°38′48″E
- Owner: Deutsche Bahn
- Operator: DB Netz; DB Station&Service
- Lines: Osterath–Dortmund Süd (KBS 490; km 6.0); KR-Uerdingen–KR Lohbruch (freight); KR-Uerdingen–DU-Mühlenberg (freight); KR-Uerdingen–Bockum (freight; closed)
- Platforms: 2

Other information
- Station code: 3406
- DS100 code: KKRU
- IBNR: 8003427
- Category: 5
- Fare zone: VRR: 324
- Website: www.bahnhof.de

History
- Opened: 29 September 1849

Services
| Preceding station | DB Regio NRW | Following station |
|---|---|---|
| Krefeld Hbf towards Mönchengladbach Hbf | RE 42 | Rheinhausen towards Münster Hbf |
| Krefeld-Linn towards Aachen Hbf | RB 33 | Krefeld-Hohenbudberg Chempark towards Essen-Steele |
| Preceding station | VIAS | Following station |
| Krefeld-Linn towards Mönchengladbach Hbf | RB 35 | Krefeld-Hohenbudberg Chempark towards Gelsenkirchen Hbf |
Location

Krefeld-Uerdingen station is a regional station in the district of Uerdingen, which has been part of the city of Krefeld in the German state of North Rhine-Westphalia since 1929. It is located in the north-east of Krefeld, near the border with the Duisburg district of Rheinhausen.

== History ==
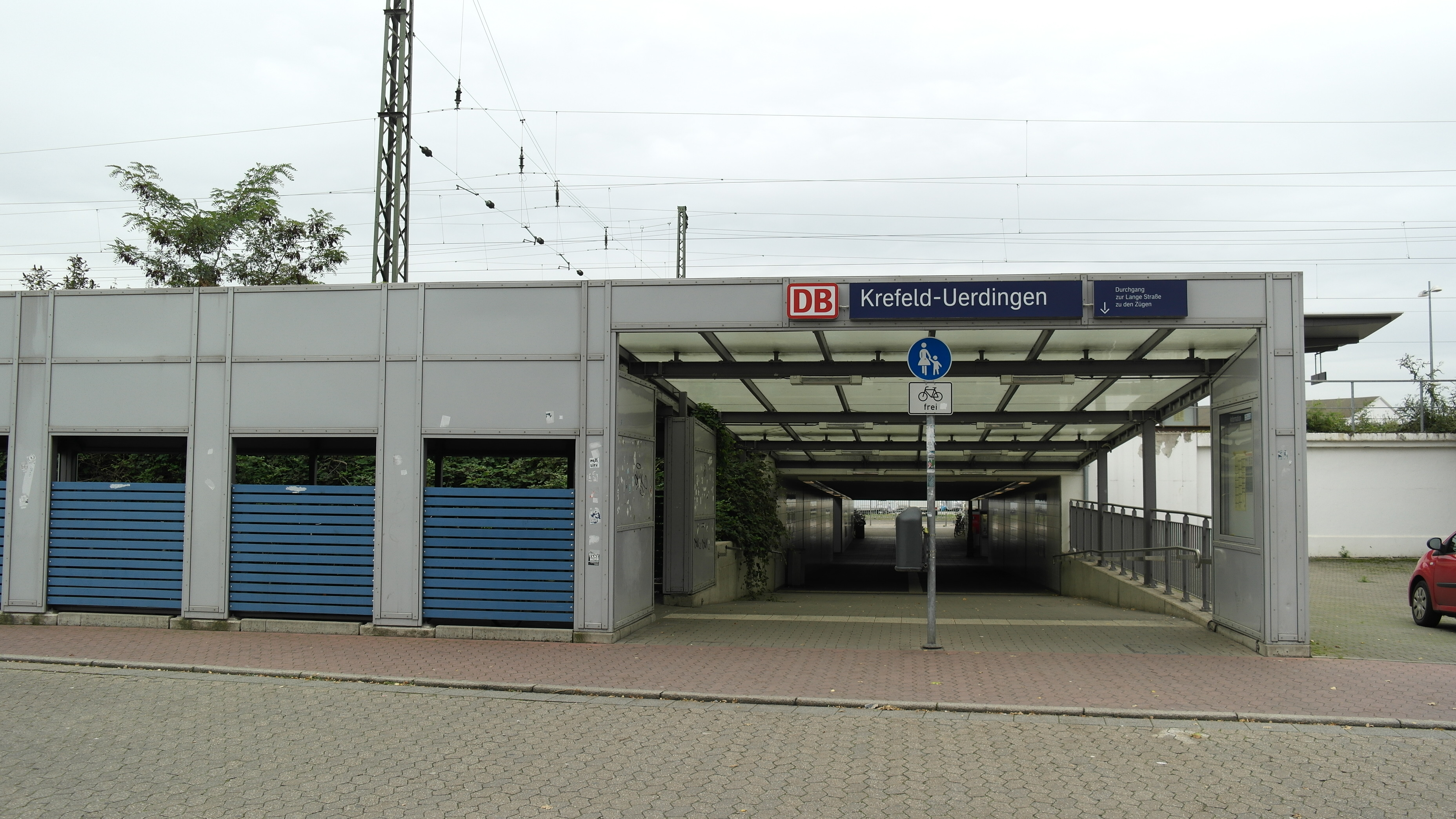
New station entrance, 2015

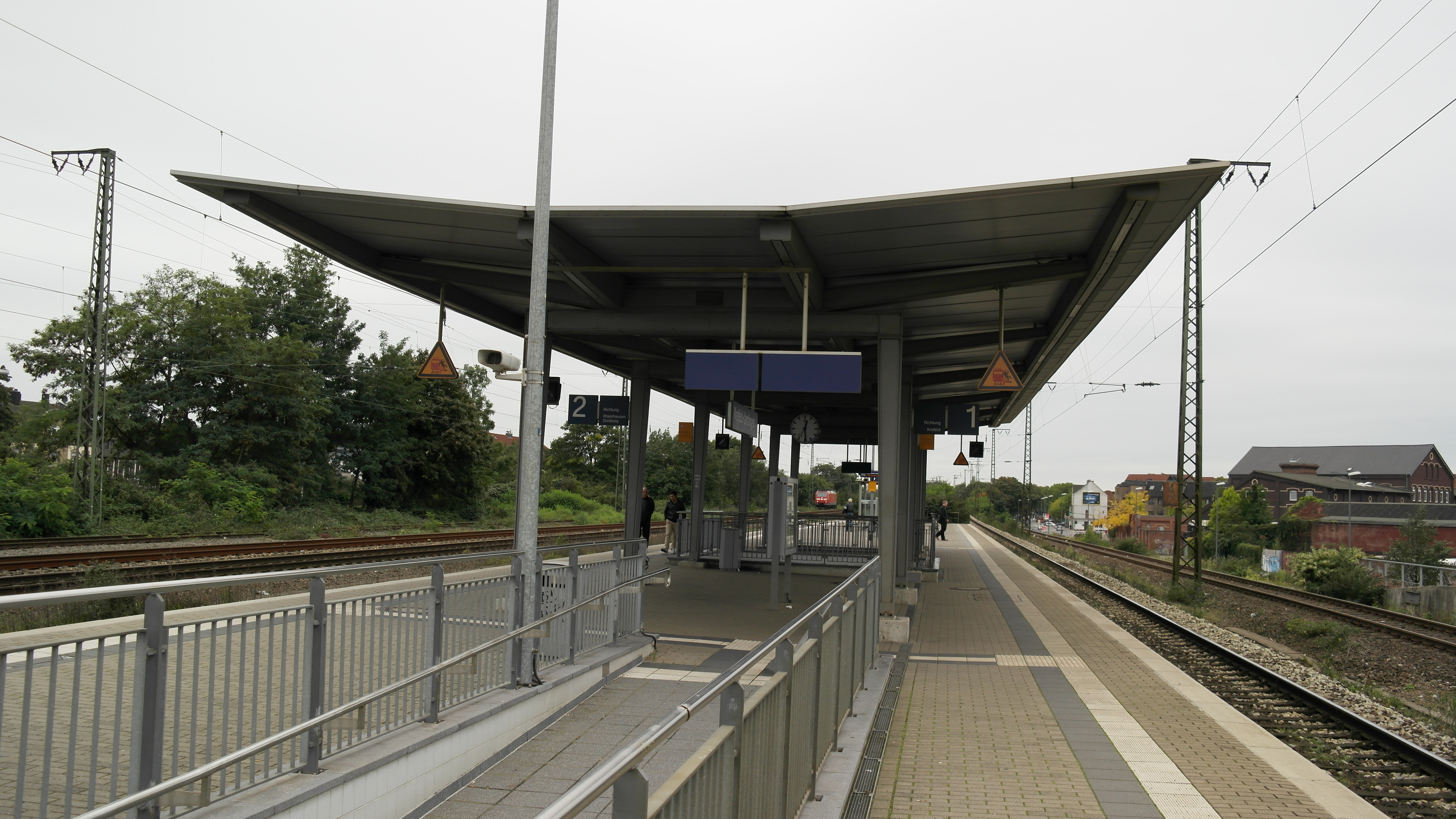
Platform, looking towards Krefeld Hbf, 2015

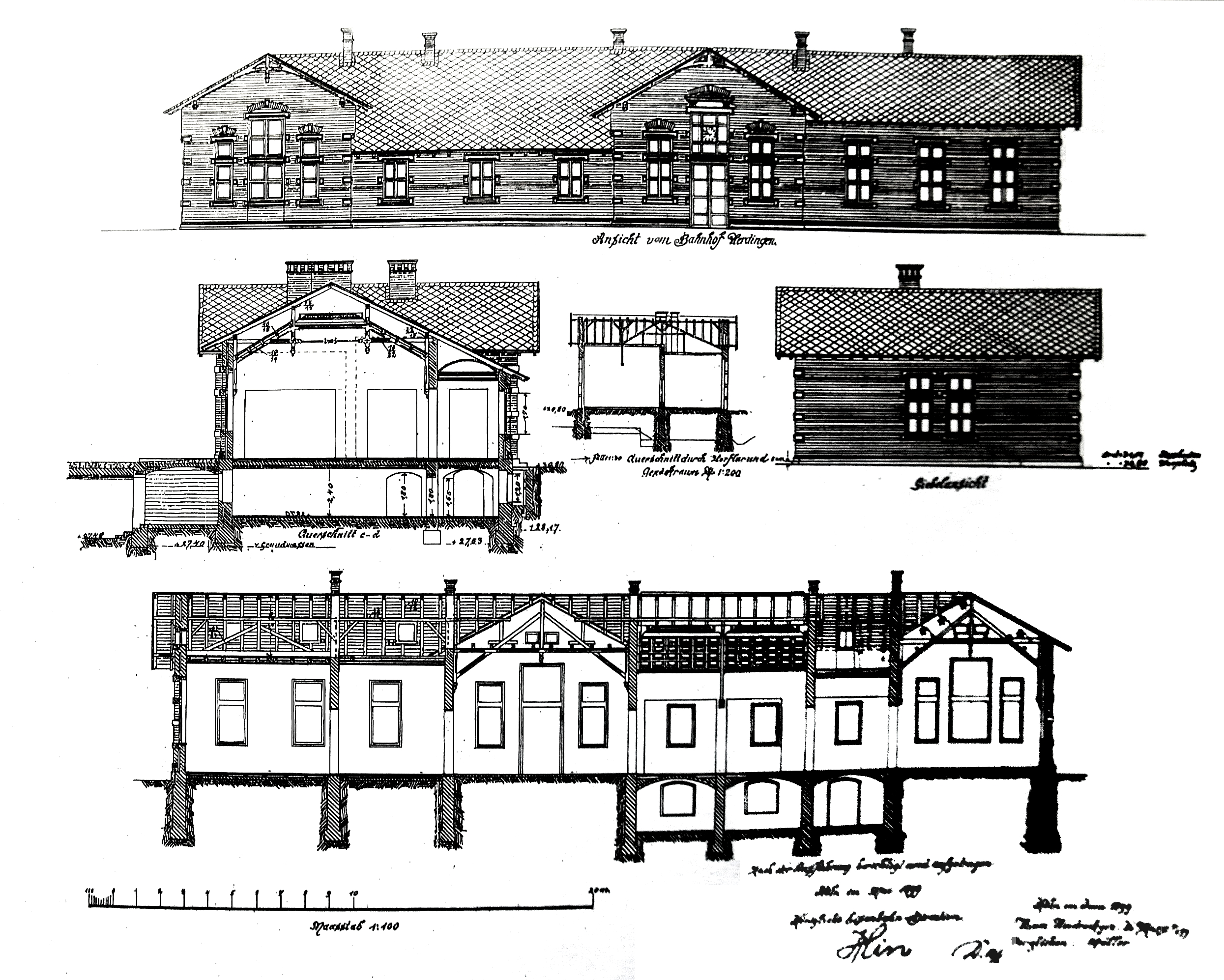
Drawing of the old station building in 1899

The station was opened on 29 September 1849 with the name of Uerdingen. From 5 October 1849, the railway ran from Uerdingen to Homberg. From 1852 until 1885, it also ran to the former Rheinhausen–Hochfeld train ferry, but this section was closed in 1961. From 1 September 1866, Uerdingen was a stop on the Osterath–Dortmund Süd railway from Meerbusch-Osterath to Essen and since 1874 to Dortmund, originally running over the Rheinhausen–Hochfeld train ferry and from 1873 over the Duisburg-Hochfeld Railway Bridge.

The current entrance building, which is no longer in use, was built in 1899 by the Königliche Eisenbahn-Direction Köln (Royal Railway Division of Cologne). It replaced the first building built in 1849. The Krefeld–Uerdingen section went into operations on 29 May 1849. The heritage-listed platform canopy was supported by 32 columns, decorated with stylised floral motifs, built originally on four-edged pedestals, later replaced by eight-edged pedestals, and was produced by the Johannes Wöller iron foundry of Uerdingen.

The station was renamed Uerdingen (Rh) in 1927. After the merger of the two cities of Crefeld and Uerdingen am Rhein in 1929, the station was renamed in accordance with the joint agreement of the two cities as Krefeld-Uerdingen-Rheinbahnhof. In 1939, it was given its current name of Krefeld-Uerdingen. Barrier-free infrastructure began to be installed at the station at the end of the 1990s. The platform was raised to a height of 70 centimetres in 2009/2010. The historic platform canopy had to be dismantled during this work.

The station building, which is a listed monument, has been empty for a long time until 2021. Plans in 2011 for an investment group to convert it into a brewery were scrapped in 2013. In 2017, the Tambour- und Fanfarenkorps Spielfreunde Uerdingen acquired the station building as a clubhouse and officially opened it in 2021.

== Rail services ==
The station is on the Duisburg–Mönchengladbach railway and is only served by regional services.

| Line | Name | Route | Frequency |
|---|---|---|---|
| RE 42 | Niers-Haard-Express | Münster – Haltern am See – Recklinghausen – Gelsenkirchen – Essen – Mülheim – Duisburg – Rheinhausen – Krefeld-Uerdingen – Krefeld – Mönchengladbach | Hourly |
| RB 33 | Rhein-Niers-Bahn | Essen – Mülheim – Duisburg – Rheinhausen – Krefeld-Uerdingen – Krefeld – Viersen – Mönchengladbach – Aachen | Hourly |
| RB 35 | Emscher-Niederrhein-Bahn | Gelsenkirchen – Oberhausen – Duisburg – Rheinhausen – Krefeld-Uerdingen – Krefeld – Viersen – Mönchengladbach | Hourly |

=== Public transport ===
The station, under the name of Uerdingen Bf, is the terminus of tram line 043 (Bockum – Hauptbahnhof). The following bus routes also stop at the station: 054 (Willich–Anrath), 058 (Gartenstadt–Traar), 831 (Meerbusch–Chempark), 927 (Bockum–Duisburg-Rheinhausen) 941 (Duisburg–Buchholz) and SB 80 (Moers via Rumeln–Kaldenhausen) as well as night lines NE8 and NE27. These services are covered by the fares of the VRR.

==== Tram line ====
| Line | Route | Interval |
|---|---|---|
| 043 | Krefeld Hbf – Rheinstraße – Bockumer Platz – Uerdingen Bf | 15 min |

==== Bus routes ====
| Line | Route |
|---|---|
| SB 80 | Am Röttgen – Uerdingen Bf – Duisburg-Rumeln-Kaldenhausen – Moers Königlicher Hof |
| 054 | Willich-Anrath Johannesstraße – Anrath Bf – Anrath Melsfeldstraße – Krefeld-Holterhöfe – Tackheide – Krefeld Hbf – Rheinstraße – Bockumer Platz – Uerdingen Bf |
| 058 | Königshof – Krefeld Hbf – Rheinstraße – Verberg – Gartenstadt – Uerdingen Bf – Elfrather Mühle – Traar |
| 831 | HPZ Uerdingen – Uerdingen Bf – Krefeld Rheinhafen – Krefeld-Gellep-Stratum – Meerbusch-Lank, Hauptstraße – Auf der Gath – Meerbusch Haus Meer |
| 927 | Rheinhausen Markt – Rheinhausen Bf – Rheinhausen Bf/Kaiserstraße – Friemersheim – Hohenbudberg Chempark (Tor 2) – Uerdingen Bf – Bockumer Platz – Krefeld-Rheinstraße – Krefeld Hbf |
| 941 | HPZ Uerdingen – Uerdingen Bf – Krefeld Rheinhafen – Krefeld-Gellep-Stratum – Meerbusch-Lank, Hauptstraße – Auf der Gath – Meerbusch Haus Meer |
| NE8 | Fischeln Grundend – Stahldorf – Krefeld Hbf – Rheinstraße – Verberg – Gartenstadt – Uerdingen Bf – Elfrather Mühle – Elfrath Rumelner Straße |
| NE27 | Rheinhausen Markt – Rheinhausen Bf – Rheinhausen Bf/Kaiserstraße – Friemersheim – Hohenbudberg Chempark (Tor 2) – Uerdingen Bf – Bockumer Platz – Krefeld-Rheinstraße – Krefeld Hbf |
