= Rheinhausen station =

Railway station in Duisburg, Germany

Rheinhausen
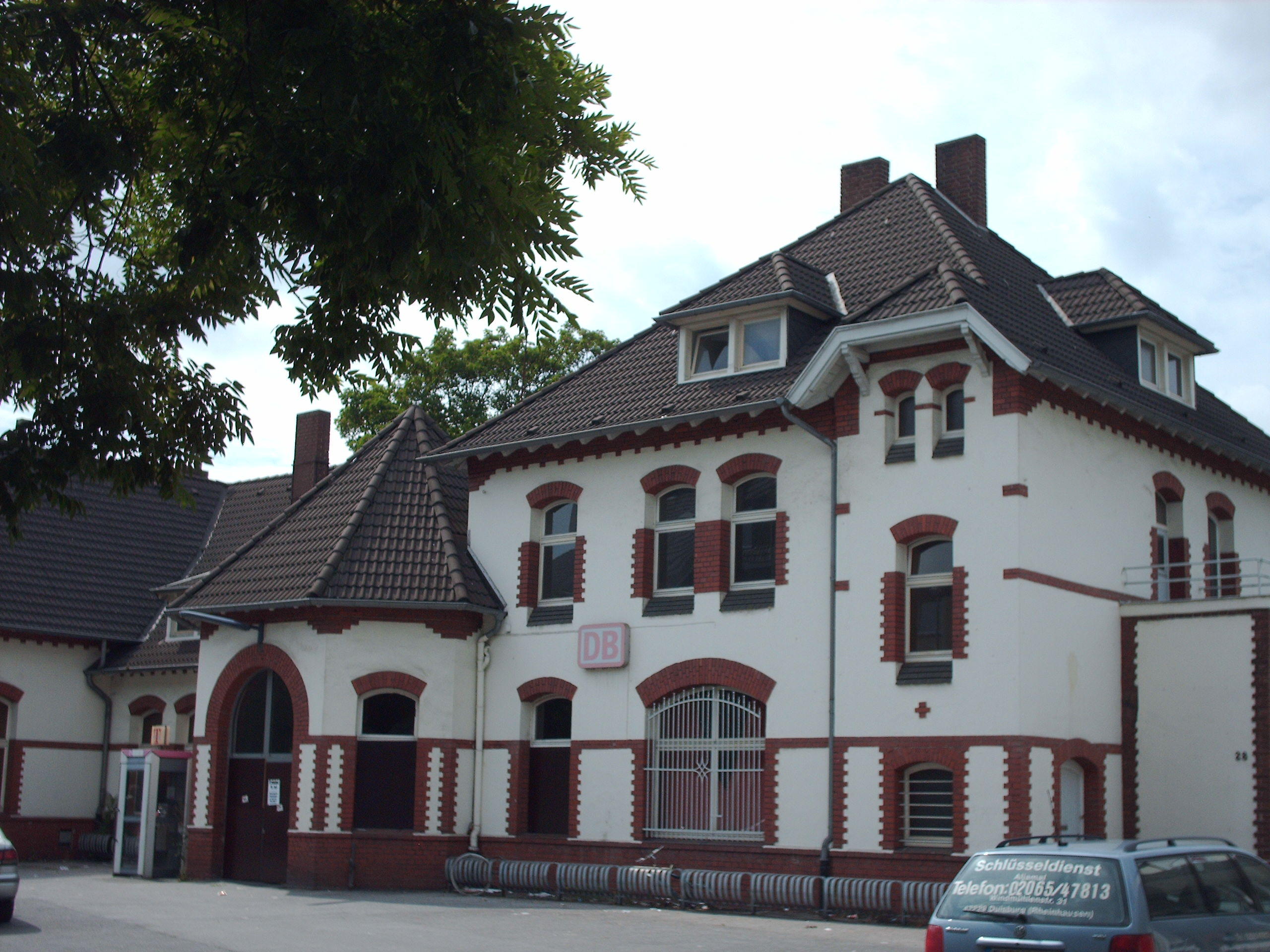
- Station building

General information
- Location: Windmühlenstr. 28, Rheinhausen, NRW; Germany
- Coordinates: 51°23′37″N 6°42′24″E
- Owner: Deutsche Bahn
- Operator: DB Netz; DB Station&Service
- Lines: DU-Ruhrort–Mönchengladbach (KBS 425); Lower Rhine Railway (KBS 498)
- Platforms: 4

Construction
- Accessible: Yes

Other information
- Station code: 5253
- DS100 code: KRH
- IBNR: 8000317
- Category: 4
- Fare zone: VRR: 334
- Website: www.bahnhof.de

History
- Opened: 8 October 1877
- Former names: Rheinhausen-Friemersheim; Friemersheim; Rheinhausen(Nrh)-Friemersheim

Services
Preceding station	DB Regio NRW	Following station
Krefeld-Uerdingen towards Mönchengladbach Hbf	RE 42	Duisburg Hbf towards Münster Hbf
Krefeld-Hohenbudberg Chempark towards Aachen Hbf	RB 33	Rheinhausen Ost towards Essen-Steele
Preceding station	NordWestBahn	Following station
Moers Terminus	RE 44	Duisburg Hbf towards Bottrop Hbf
Rumeln towards Xanten	RB 31	Duisburg Hbf Terminus
Preceding station	VIAS	Following station
Krefeld-Hohenbudberg Chempark towards Mönchengladbach Hbf	RB 35	Rheinhausen Ost towards Gelsenkirchen Hbf
Location
- Location within North Rhine-Westphalia

Rheinhausen station is located in the Duisburg suburb of Rheinhausen in the Lower Rhine region of the German state of North Rhine-Westphalia. It lies on the Duisburg-Ruhrort–Mönchengladbach railway and is the starting point of the Lower Rhine Railway towards Xanten.

== Location ==
The station is not in central Rheinhausen, but in the suburb of Friemersheim. However, Friemersheim was incorporated into the new city of Rheinhausen in 1934 and has been part of the Duisburg borough of Rheinhausen since 1975.

In front of the station is a shopping mall, which leads to Friemersheim market. The Kruppsee (lake) and its environs is a recreation area next to the line towards Krefeld. Behind the station are extensive residential areas, which are part of central Rheinhausen.

== History ==
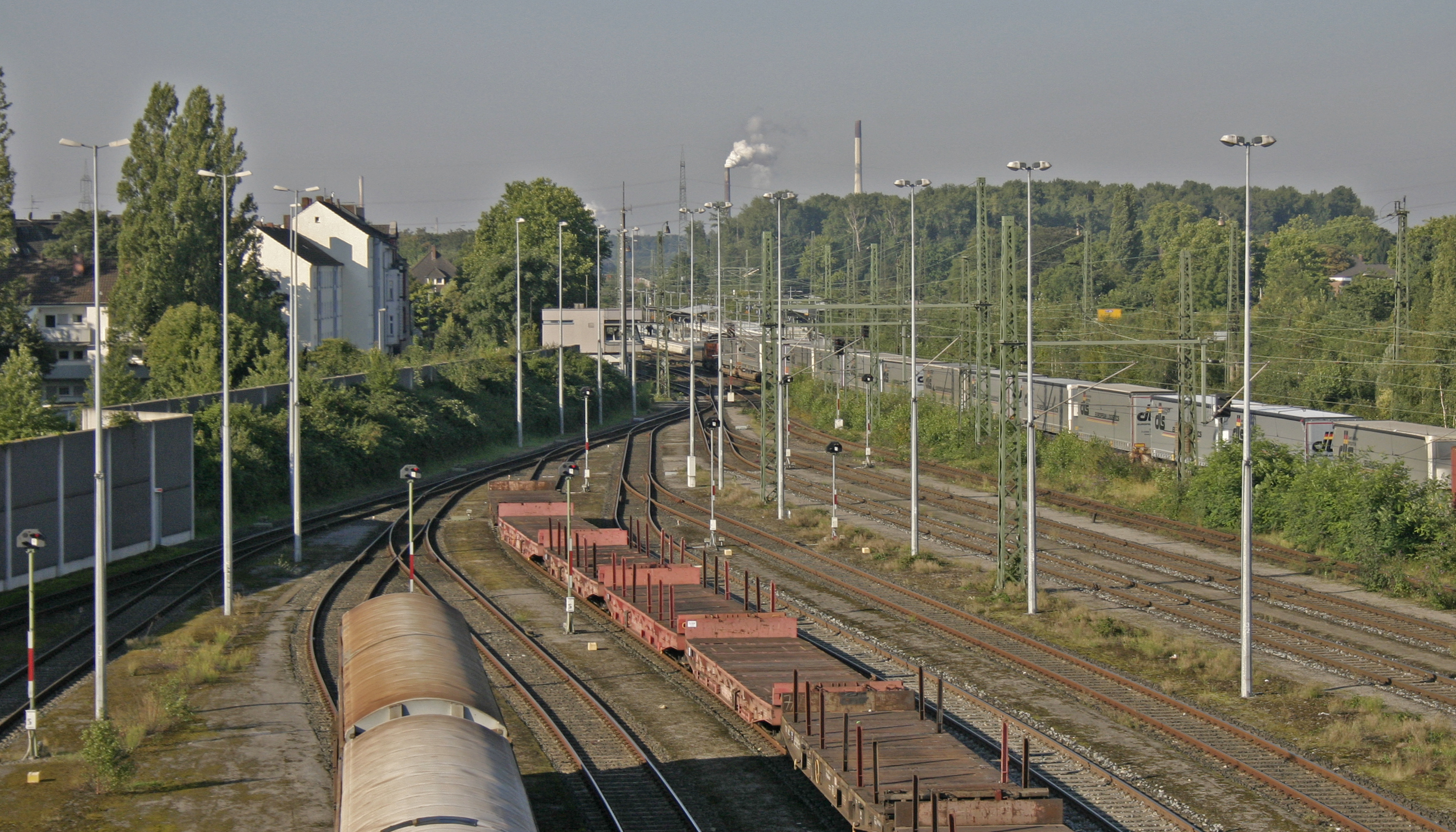
Freight yard with passenger platforms in the background, 2015

The first Rheinhausen station was built with the construction of the Osterath–Essen railway of the Rhenish Railway Company (RheinischeEisenbahn-Gesellschaft) and formed the station at the western end of the Ruhrort–Homberg train ferry. It was located in the municipality of Hochemmerich, south of the Duisburg–Hochfeld railway bridge, which was built in 1873, on the site now containing a port and logistics centre called Logport. With the construction of the bridge, the old station was demolished and a new Rheinhausen station was erected on the municipal territory of Friemersheim. This went into operation on 8 October 1877. The Prussian state railways rebuilt the station in 1894 due to the increased traffic volume.

The station building, which had been erected in 1877 on the Kruppstraße in Friemersheim, was demolished in 1904. The construction of the entrance building was mainly related to the construction of the Rheinhausen–Kleve railway. The new entrance building was built on Windmühlenstraße, not far from the former station building. The station was given the double name of Rheinhausen-Friemersheim on 1 May 1904 at the initiative of the Friemersheim mayor. With the commissioning of a halt at the Friedrich-Alfred steelworks to the east of the station, which was given the name of Rheinhausen, the original station was renamed Friemersheim. In 1923, the municipalities of Hochemmerich and Friemersheim were merged into the municipality of Rheinhausen. In 1936/37, Friemersheim station was renamed Rheinhausen , while Rheinhausen halt was renamed Rheinhausen Ost.

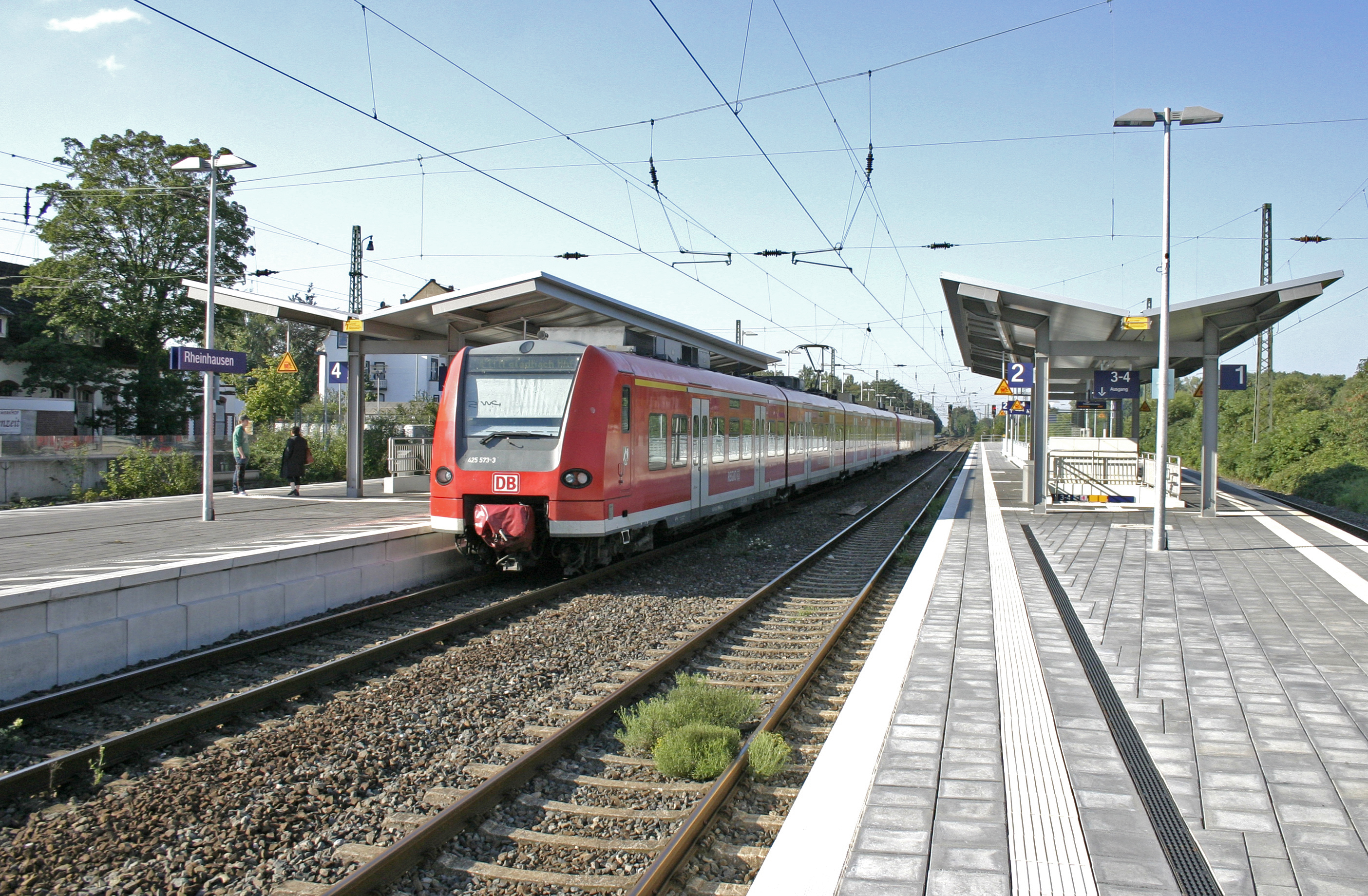
RE 11 near Mönchengladbach Hbf on platform 3, 2015

In 1915, during the First World War, various offices were added. From the beginning of the 1920s onwards, there was growing criticism of the state of the waiting rooms. At the same time, plans were made to merge the Friemersheim and Rheinhausen stations as a single central passenger station. The redevelopment of the waiting rooms was continually postponed because of the latter proposal. However, the new central station did not eventuate.

The tunnel under the platforms has remained in the original form from the period when the station building was built. It was extended between 2006 and 2007 to the north side of the railways and under a newly built approach road to Logport called Am Logport. The platforms are now also accessible from the Hochemmerich side through the district around Behringstraße, Lindenallee and Maiblumenstraße. In 2014/15, the entrance were adapted for the needs of the disabled, with both the platform and the entrance from Friemersheim equipped with wheelchair-accessible ramps.

The Rheinhausen (Friemersheim) West signal box was built at the time of the construction of the station building on Windmühlenstraße. It was built on the abutment of an overpass over the railway tracks. The overpass was replaced by the Rheingoldstraße/Bachstraße underpass at the end of the 1950s as the bridge was no longer able to cope with the increasing truck and car traffic because of its restricted width and load capacity. In addition, its clearance was insufficient for the later electrification of the line. The Rmf signal box (Rheinhausen Mittefahrtsleiter), which was built in brick construction and positioned east of the railway station between the railway lines, was put into service in 1890 and replaced in 1973 by a relay interlocking on Kruppstraße.

== Structure ==
The now closed station building of 1904 stands on the southern side of the tracks. The station has two island platforms, which are connected by a tunnel, which was extended in 2007 to a new entrance on the northern side of the tracks.

The southern platform gives access to tracks 3 and 4, which are on the lines between Duisburg Hauptbahnhof and Krefeld Hauptbahnhof. Tracks 1 and 2 branch off the line from Duisburg east of the station at a level junction and run to the northern platform, which is used by trains to and from Moers and Xanten.

Track	Line	Route
1	RB 31RE 44	Moers, Xanten
2	RB 31RE 44	Duisburg, Oberhausen, Bottrop
3	RE 42RB 33RB 35	Krefeld, Mönchengladbach, Aachen
4	RE 42RB 33RB 35	Duisburg, Essen, Gelsenkirchen, Münster, Oberhausen, Wesel

== Rail services ==
Rheinhausen station is served by five regional transport services. The RE 42 and RB 33 services are operated by DB Regio NRW. RE 44 and RB 31 are operated by NordWestBahn. RB 35 is operated by VIAS.

Line	Name	Route	KBS
RE 42	Niers-Haard-Express	Münster – Haltern am See – Recklinghausen – Gelsenkirchen – Essen – Mülheim – Duisburg – Rheinhausen – Krefeld-Uerdingen – Krefeld – Mönchengladbach	490
RE 44	Fossa-Emscher-Express	Bottrop - Oberhausen - Duisburg - Rheinhausen – Moers	498
RB 31	Der Niederrheiner	Xanten – Moers – Rheinhausen – Duisburg Hbf	498
RB 33	Rhein-Niers-Bahn	Essen – Mülheim – Duisburg Hbf – Rheinhausen – Krefeld Hbf – Mönchengladbach Hbf – Aachen	490
RB 35	Emscher-Niederrhein-Bahn	Gelsenkirchen – Oberhausen Hbf – Duisburg – Rheinhausen – Krefeld – Viersen – Mönchengladbach	490
