= Krefeld Hauptbahnhof =

Railway station in Krefeld, Germany

Krefeld Hbf
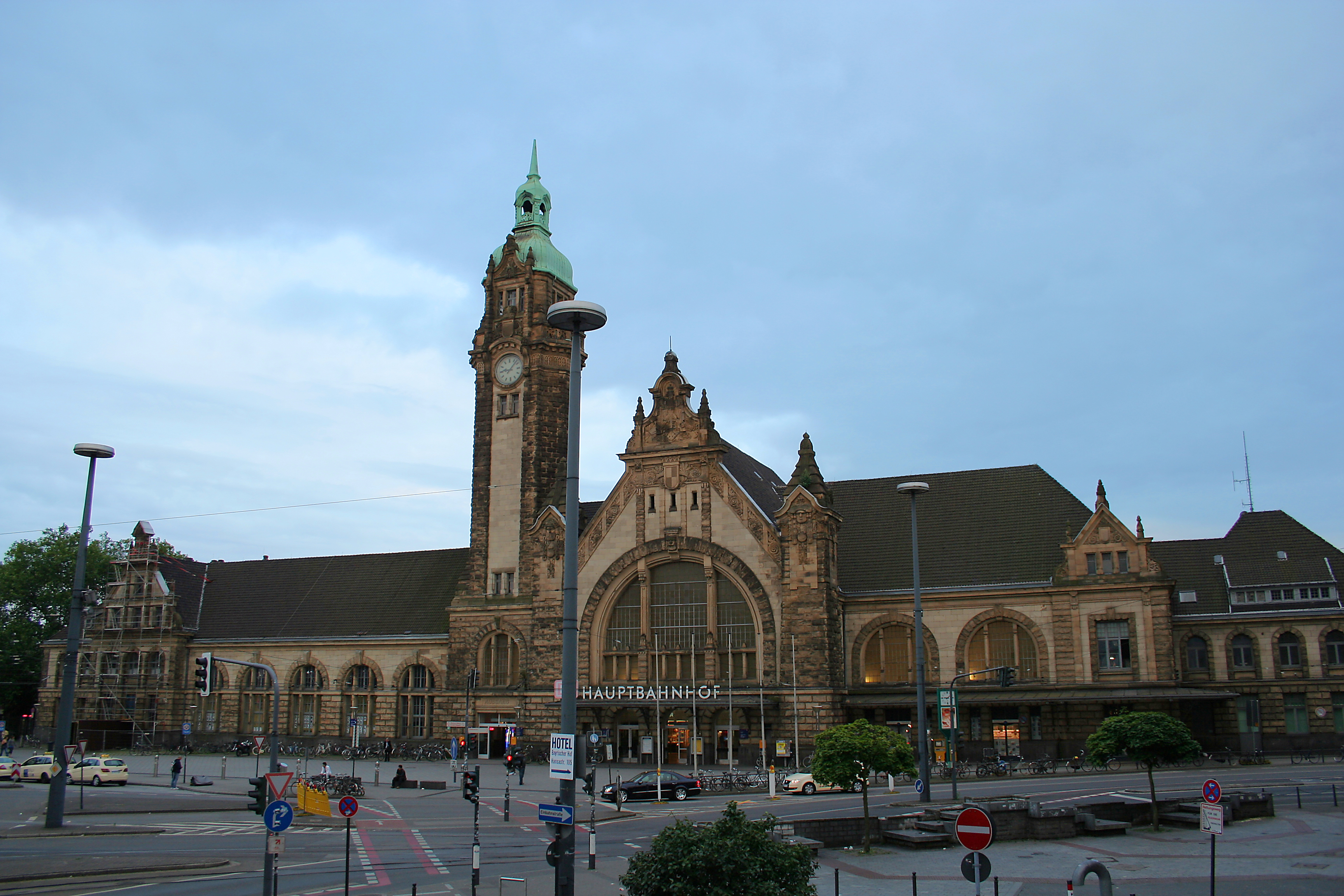
- Station forecourt and the station front

General information
- Location: Am Hauptbahnhof 1, Krefeld, NRW; Germany
- Coordinates: 51°19′33″N 6°34′10″E
- Owner: Deutsche Bahn
- Operator: DB Netz; DB Station&Service
- Lines: Duisburg–Mönchengladbach (KBS 425); Lower Left Rhine Railway (KBS 4495); Viersen–Moers (KBS 12424); former Krefeld–Rheydt
- Platforms: 2 island platforms 1 side platform
- Tracks: 5

Construction
- Accessible: Yes

Other information
- Station code: 3403
- DS100 code: KKR
- IBNR: 8000211
- Category: 3
- Fare zone: VRR: 320
- Website: www.bahnhof.de

History
- Opened: 5 October 1849

Services
Preceding station	DB Fernverkehr	Following station
Viersen towards Aachen Hbf	ICE 14	Duisburg Hbf towards Berlin Ostbahnhof
Preceding station	National Express Germany	Following station
Terminus	RE 7 (Rhein-Münsterland-Express)	Krefeld-Oppum towards Rheine
Preceding station	NordWestBahn	Following station
Kempen towards Kleve	RE 10	Krefeld-Oppum towards Düsseldorf Hbf
Preceding station	DB Regio NRW	Following station
Viersen towards Mönchengladbach Hbf	RE 42	Krefeld-Uerdingen towards Münster Hbf
Forsthaus towards Aachen Hbf	RB 33	Krefeld-Oppum towards Essen-Steele
Preceding station	VIAS	Following station
Forsthaus towards Mönchengladbach Hbf	RB 35	Krefeld-Oppum towards Gelsenkirchen Hbf
Preceding station	Rhine-Ruhr Stadtbahn	Following station
Krefeld Rheinstraße Terminus	U70	Dießem towards Düsseldorf Hbf
Krefeld Rheinstraße Terminus	U76	Dießem towards Handelszentrum/Moskauer Straße
Location

Krefeld Hauptbahnhof is the largest station of the city of Krefeld in the German state of North Rhine-Westphalia. The double-track and electrified Duisburg-Ruhrort–Mönchengladbach railway (KBS 425) and the Lower Left Rhine Railway (KBS 495) cross at the station.

== History ==
The station was opened in 1847. From 1906 to 1909, the line and the station were elevated to raise the railway tracks above the streets in the urban area. Around this time, the station was renamed Krefeld Hauptbahnhof (main station). Until 1950, there was also a nearby station of the Crefelder Eisenbahn-Gesellschaft (Krefeld Railway Company, later spelt with an initial "K", CEC); its line to Rheydt used the route now occupied by federal highway 9. This Krefeld Süd (south) station was rebuilt during the elevation of the tracks to the south of the main station, but the trains did not run into the main station. The line to Rheydt now only extends as far as the Krefeld steelworks as a siding. Previously there was also a connection to the line to Hülser Berg (part of the Viersen–Moers line, which is now partly operated as the Schluff museum railway). The line to Hülser Berg is still connected to Krefeld station by a slightly longer route.

Krefeld no longer has a significant role as railway node since the closure of the large Hohenbudberg marshalling yard (on the line to Duisburg, just outside the city limits) and the freight yard located east of the station and the abandonment of long-distance passenger services. There is still an important maintenance facility in Krefeld-Oppum, including for the servicing of Intercity-Express trains.

== Services ==
The Duisburg–Mönchengladbach line is usually served every hour by the Regional-Express service RE 42 (Niers-Haard-Express) and Regionalbahn services RB 33 (Rhein-Niers-Bahn) and RB 35 (Emscher-Niederrhein-Bahn). The Lower Rhine line is served every half hour by RE 10 (Niers-Express) between Kleve and Düsseldorf and every hour by the RE 7 (Rhein-Münsterland-Express) between Krefeld and Rheine via Cologne and RB37 connecting Neuss and Krefeld.

In addition to the railway lines, the station is served by nine bus lines and four tram lines of SWK MOBIL and another three bus lines of Busverkehr Rheinland (Rhineland Bus Transport), which are organised by the Verkehrsverbund Rhein-Ruhr. In addition, the station is also served by two lines (U70/U76) of the Düsseldorf Stadtbahn, operated by Rheinbahn.
