= Aachen Hauptbahnhof =

Railway station in Aachen, Germany

Aachen Hbf
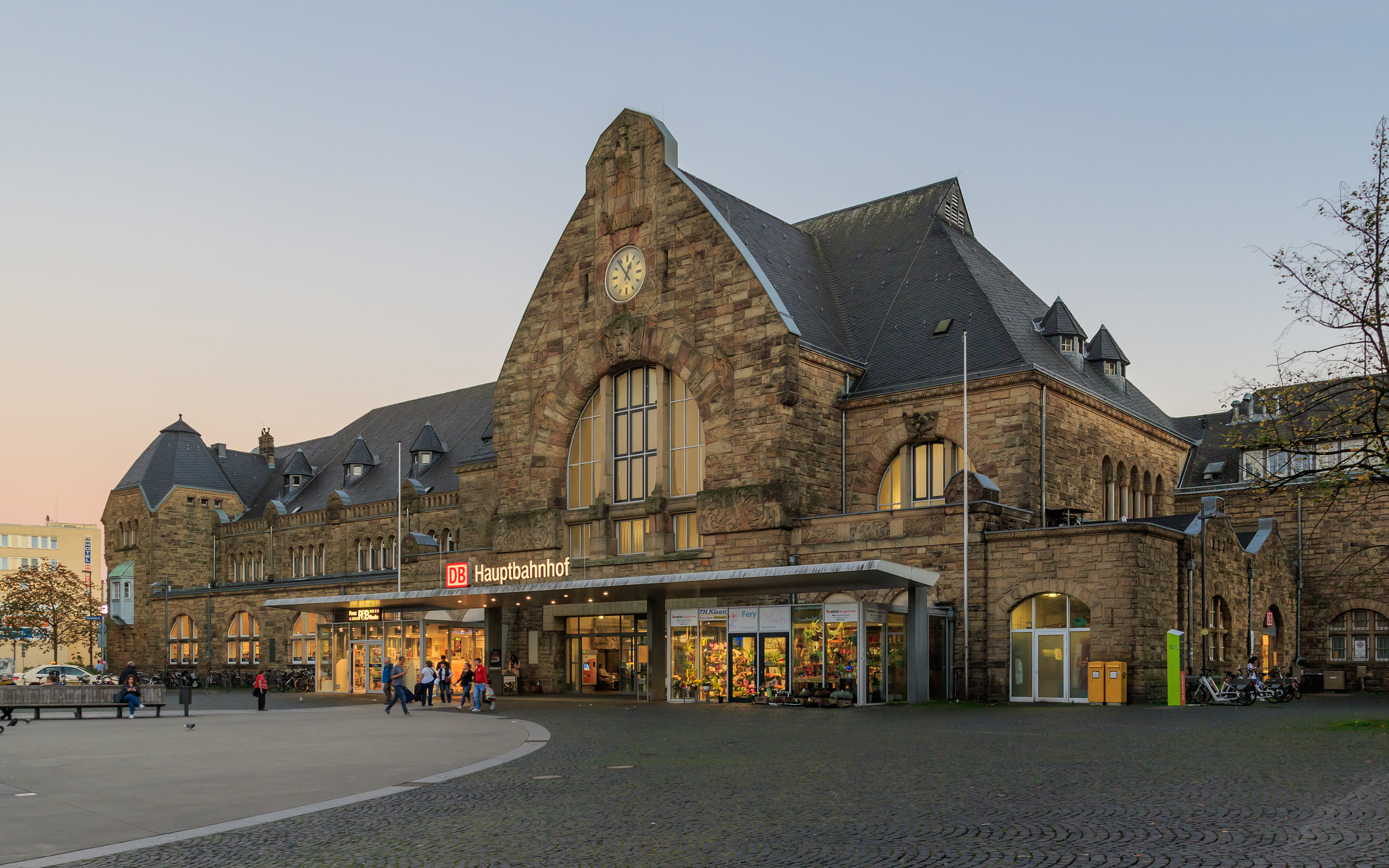
- Station forecourt and main entrance

General information
- Location: Bahnhofplatz 2a 52064 Aachen; Aachen, North Rhine-Westphalia; Germany
- Coordinates: 50°46′03″N 6°05′28″E
- Lines: Aachen–Cologne (HSL/KBS 480); Aachen–Liège (HSL 3); Aachen–Liège (KBS 480a/L 37); Aachen–Mönchengladbach (KBS 485)
- Platforms: 7

Construction
- Accessible: Yes
- Architect: Friedrich Mettegang
- Architectural style: Art Nouveau

Other information
- Station code: 1
- DS100 code: KA
- IBNR: 8000001
- Category: 2
- Fare zone: AVV: Aachen City-XL-Zone; VRS: 3100 (AVV transitional tariff)
- Website: www.bahnhof.de

History
- Opened: 1905; 121 years ago
Services
Preceding station	Eurostar	Following station
Liège-Guillemins towards Paris-Nord	Eurostar	Köln Hbf towards Dortmund Hbf
Preceding station	DB Fernverkehr	Following station
Geilenkirchen One-way operation	ICE 10	Terminus
Herzogenrath towards Berlin Ostbahnhof	ICE 14	Terminus
Terminus	ICE 14	Düren towards Berlin Ostbahnhof
Liège-Guillemins towards Antwerpen-Centraal or Brussels-South	ICE 79	Köln Hbf towards Frankfurt (Main) Hbf
Preceding station		Following station
Terminus	FLX 30	Köln Hbf towards Leipzig Hbf
Preceding station	DB Regio NRW	Following station
Terminus	RE 9	Aachen-Rothe Erde towards Siegen Hbf
Aachen Schanz towards Heerlen or Alsdorf Poststraße	RB 20	Aachen-Rothe Erde towards Langerwehe/Düren or Stolberg Altstadt
Aachen Schanz towards Essen Hbf	RB 33	Terminus
Preceding station	Arriva Netherlands	Following station
Aachen West towards Liège-Guillemins	RE 18; LIMAX; Drielandentrein; Dreiländerzug; Train des trois pays	Terminus
Preceding station	National Express Germany	Following station
Terminus	RE 1 (NRW-Express)	Aachen-Rothe Erde towards Hamm (Westf) Hbf
Terminus	RE 4 (Wupper-Express)	Aachen Schanz towards Dortmund Hbf
Preceding station	NMBS/SNCB	Following station
Hergenrath (Belgium) towards Liège-Guillemins	RE 29 euregioAIXpress	Terminus
Location

Aachen Hauptbahnhof (German for Aachen main station) is the most important railway station for the city of Aachen, in the far west of Germany near the Dutch and Belgian border. It is the largest of the four currently active Aachen stations, and is integrated into the long-distance network.

== History ==
A station at Aachen was first opened in 1841, when the Rheinische Eisenbahngesellschaft opened its line from Cologne. The line first was extended to Herbesthal (near the Belgian border) and on 15 October 1843 to Antwerp. The first station was built outside of the city walls, however the city soon grew and the station eventually became surrounded by new buildings. The Prussian state railways deemed that rather impractical and decided to build a new station situated on a hillside. Embankments and new bridges were built from 1901 onward, and on 21 December 1905 the station opened at its new location.

The station remained largely undisturbed until suffering from damage in 1944, when German troops were retreating. However, since the rail link was highly valued by the Allied forces, damage was cleared up rather quickly and in 1950 all war damage had been removed from the site. Since 2002 the Cologne–Aachen high-speed railway line allows connections to Cologne with speeds up to 250 km/h (160 mph).

== Electrification ==
In 1966, Aachen Hauptbahnhof was electrified. Due to its proximity to Belgium, it was decided to implement the switching point from the Deutsche Bahn's 15 kV AC to the 3000 V DC used by the NMBS/SNCB in the station. Tracks 6 to 9 therefore have a switchable catenary and are used for international Thalys, ICE and Regional-Express services.

== Renovations ==
The station hall was renovated from 2000 to 2006. In 2007 a new electronic signal box was built, enabling more streamlined operations and automatic switching of the correct voltages. The cost estimate for the revamp was around €40 million. The main changes were:

- Construction of 400m long platforms for international traffic, replacing the old 250m platforms that did not allow economic usage due to their limited length.
- Special through tracks (tracks 3 and 4) for freight trains to the Netherlands and Belgium (via Montzen) to Aachen West.
- Constructional changes to the system changeover point to Belgium; a new track layout, which allows the smooth changeover of electric locomotives and is capable of handling the increasing number of through carriages.
- Improvement of the layout to remove operating problems, especially in the sidings.

== Train services ==
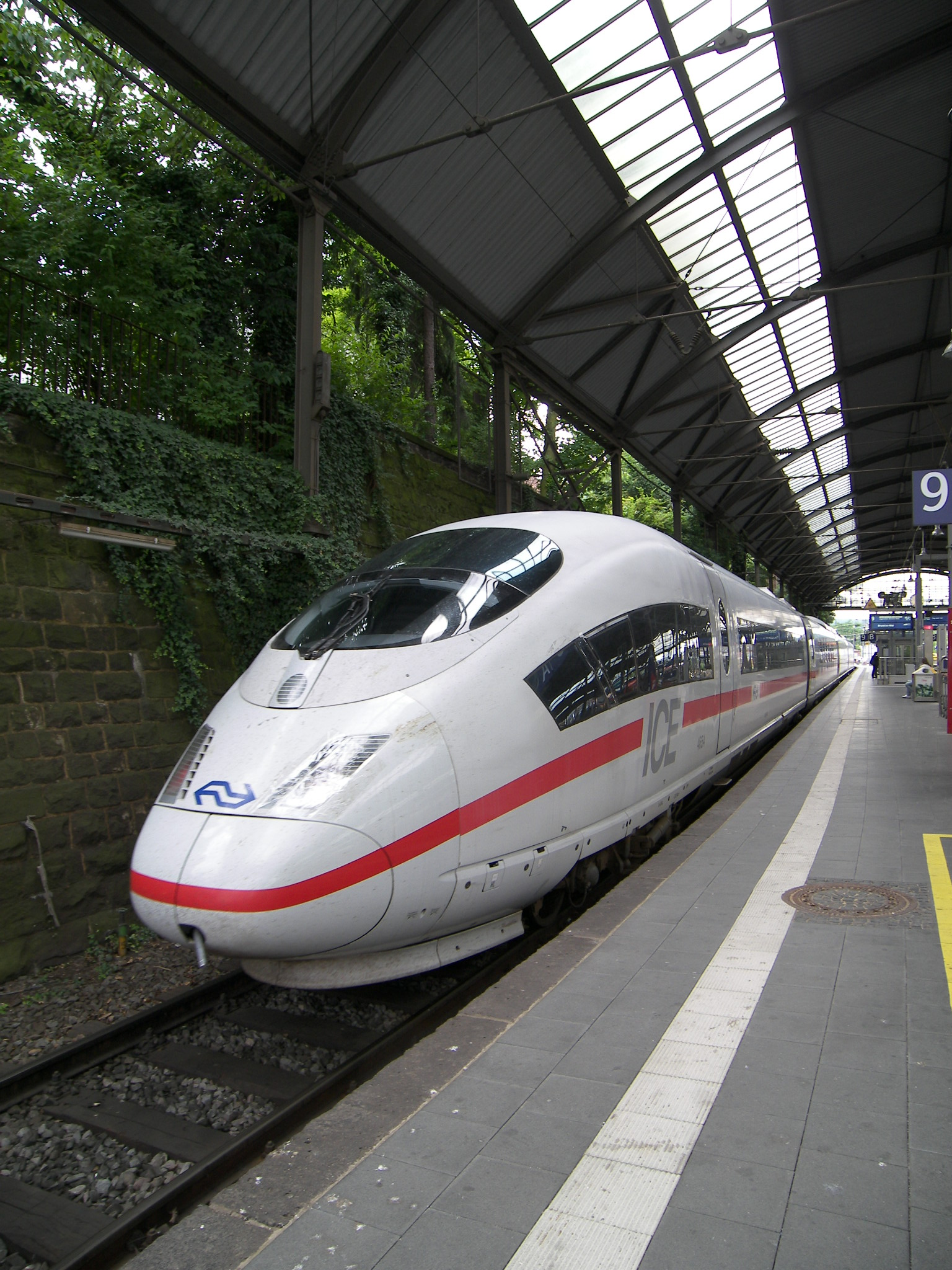
ICE 3M train en route from Brussels to Frankfurt in Aachen Hauptbahnhof.

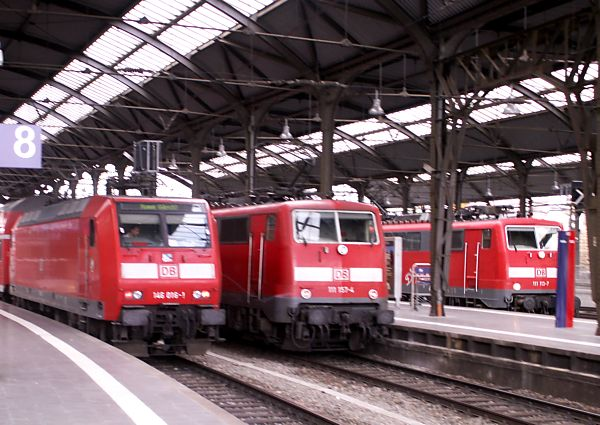
Regional-Express trains in Aachen Hauptbahnhof.

The following services currently call at Aachen Hbf:

Series	Operator	Route		Material	Frequency
Eurostar (high-speed)	Eurostar	Paris Nord – Brussels-South – Liège-Guillemins – Aachen Hbf – Cologne – (Düsseldorf – Duisburg – Essen – Dortmund)		Thalys PBKA	5x per day
ICE 79 (high-speed)	DB	Brussels-South – Brussels-North – Liège-Guillemins – Aachen – Cologne – (Siegburg/Bonn – Montabaur – Limburg –) Frankfurt Airport – Frankfurt		ICE 3neo – Class 408	Every 2 hours
ICE 14	DB	Aachen – Mönchengladbach – Krefeld –	Duisburg – Essen – Bochum – Dortmund – Hamm – Gütersloh – Bielefeld – Herford – Hannover – Wolfsburg – Berlin-Spandau – Berlin – Berlin Ostbahnhof	ICE T / ICE 2	2x per day
ICE 14	DB	Aachen – Cologne – Düsseldorf –	Duisburg – Essen – Bochum – Dortmund – Hamm – Gütersloh – Bielefeld – Herford – Hannover – Wolfsburg – Berlin-Spandau – Berlin – Berlin Ostbahnhof	ICE 4	2x per day
ICE 19	DB	Aachen – Cologne – Wuppertal – Hannover – Wolfsburg – Berlin-Spandau – Berlin – Berlin Ostbahnhof		ICE 1 / ICE 2	1x per day
FLX 30	Flixtrain	Aachen – Cologne – Düsseldorf – Duisburg – Essen – Dortmund – Bielefeld – Hannover – Berlin-Spandau – Berlin – Berlin Südkreuz – Lutherstadt Wittenberg – Leipzig		Siemens Vectron BR193 + railway coaches	3x per week
NJ 425 (night train)	ÖBB Nightjet	Brussels-South – Brussels-North – Liège-Guillemins – Aachen – Cologne-Ehrenfeld – Bonn – Koblenz – Mainz – Mannheim only operational stop/Dividing train –	Frankfurt South – Erfurt – Halle (Saale) – Berlin Südkreuz – Berlin	Compartment coaches, Couchette cars, Sleeping cars	3x per week
NJ 40425 (night train)	ÖBB Nightjet	Brussels-South – Brussels-North – Liège-Guillemins – Aachen – Cologne-Ehrenfeld – Bonn – Koblenz – Mainz – Mannheim only operational stop/Dividing train –	Munich East – Rosenheim – Salzburg – Linz – St. Pölten – Wien Meidling – Vienna	Compartment coaches, Couchette cars, Sleeping cars	3x per week
RE 1 NRW-Express	National Express	Aachen – Eschweiler – Düren – Horrem – Cologne – Düsseldorf – Duisburg – Mülheim (Ruhr) – Essen – Bochum – Dortmund – Hamm		2x BR462 Siemens Desiro HC	1x per hour
RE 4 Wupper-Express	National Express	Aachen – Herzogenrath – Rheydt – Mönchengladbach – Neuss – Düsseldorf – Wuppertal – Hagen – Witten – Dortmund		1-2x BR462 Siemens Desiro HC	1x per hour
RE 9 Rhein-Sieg-Express	DB Regio NRW	Aachen – Eschweiler – Düren – Horrem – Cologne – Troisdorf – Siegburg/Bonn – Hennef – Au (Sieg) – Siegen		Talent 2, DB Class 146.0 + 5-6x double-deck coach	1x per hour
RE 18; LIMAX	Arriva Nederland	Aachen – Aachen West – Herzogenrath – Eygelshoven Markt – Landgraaf – Heerlen – Valkenburg – Meerssen – Maastricht – Maastricht Randwyck – Eijsden – Visé – Bressoux – Liège Guillemins		Stadler FLIRT 3	2x per hour (Aachen – Maastricht), 1x per hour (Maastricht – Liège)
RB 20; Euregiobahn	DB Regio NRW	Alsdorf-Annapark – Alsdorf-Busch – Herzogenrath-August-Schmidt-Platz – Herzogenrath-Alt-Merkstein – Herzogenrath – Kohlscheid – Aachen West – Aachen Schanz – Aachen – Aachen-Rothe Erde – Eilendorf – Stolberg (Rheinland) –	Eschweiler-West – Eschweiler Talbahnhof – Eschweiler-Nothberg – Eschweiler-Weisweiler – Langerwehe – Düren	DB Class 643	2x per hour
RB 20; Euregiobahn	DB Regio NRW	Alsdorf-Annapark – Alsdorf-Busch – Herzogenrath-August-Schmidt-Platz – Herzogenrath-Alt-Merkstein – Herzogenrath – Kohlscheid – Aachen West – Aachen Schanz – Aachen – Aachen-Rothe Erde – Eilendorf – Stolberg (Rheinland) –	Stolberg-Schneidmühle – Stolberg-Mühlener Bahnhof – Stolberg-Rathaus – Stolberg-Altstadt	DB Class 643	2x per hour
S 41 euregioAIXpress	SNCB/NMBS	Liège-St.-Lambert – Liège-Guillemins – Angleur – Chaudfontaine – Pepinster – Verviers – Welkenraedt – Hergenrath – Aachen		SNCB Class 18 + 4x I11 Coaches	1x per hour
RB 33; Rhein-Niers-Bahn	DB Regio NRW	Essen – Mülheim (Ruhr) – Mülheim-Styrum – Duisburg – Duisburg-Hochfeld Süd – Rheinhausen Ost – Rheinhausen – Krefeld-Hohenbudberg Chempark – Krefeld-Uerdingen – Krefeld-Linn – Krefeld-Oppum – Krefeld – Forsthaus – Anrath – Viersen – Mönchengladbach – Rheydt – Wickrath – Herrath – Erkelenz – Hückelhoven-Baal – Brachelen –	Lindern – Geilenkirchen – Übach-Palenberg – Herzogenrath – Kohlscheid – Aachen West – Aachen Schanz – Aachen	2x BR1440 Alstom Coradia Continental	1x per hour
RB 33; Rhein-Niers-Bahn	DB Regio NRW	Heinsberg –	Lindern – Geilenkirchen – Übach-Palenberg – Herzogenrath – Kohlscheid – Aachen West – Aachen Schanz – Aachen	2x BR1440 Alstom Coradia Continental	1x per hour
S19; Cologne S-Bahn	DB Regio NRW	Aachen – Aachen-Rothe Erde – Stolberg (Rheinland) – Langerwehe – Düren – Horrem – Cologne – Cologne/Bonn Airport – Troisdorf – Hennef (Sieg)		DB Class 423	2x per night

== Operational usage ==
Aachen Hauptbahnhof is served by the following lines:

- Cologne–Aachen (KBS 480)
- Aachen–Brussels
- Aachen–Mönchengladbach (KBS 485)
- Liège–Aachen line (KBS 480a/L 37)
