= Uerdingen =

District of Krefeld, Germany

- Stadtteil of Krefeld
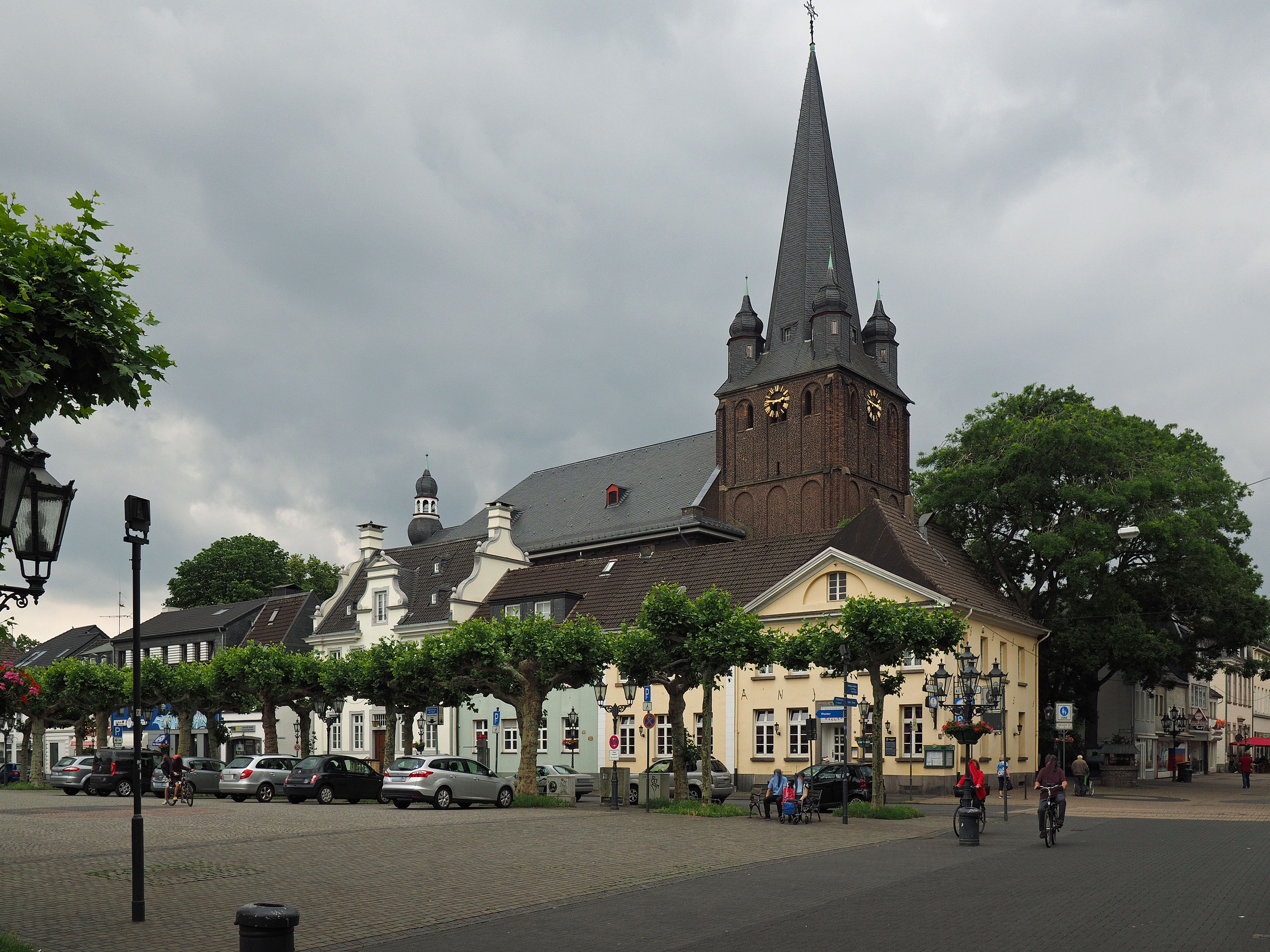
- Market square and St. Peter's church
- Interactive map of Uerdingen
- Location within Germany Location within North Rhine-Westphalia
- Coordinates: 51°21′N 6°39′E
- Country: Germany
- State: North Rhine-Westphalia
- Admin. region: Düsseldorf
- District: Urban district
- City: Krefeld

Area
  - Total: 14.82 km^{2} (5.72 sq mi)

Population (2019-12-31)
  - Total: 17,888
  - Density: 1,207/km^{2} (3,126/sq mi)
- Time zone: UTC+01:00 (CET)
  - Summer (DST): UTC+02:00 (CEST)
- Vehicle registration: KR

Uerdingen (German pronunciation: [ˈyːɐ̯dɪŋən]) is a district of the city of Krefeld, Germany, with a population of 17,888 (2019). Originally a separate city in its own right, Uerdingen merged with the city of Krefeld in 1929. Today, Uerdingen is best known for a local distillery and a railcar factory, and is the eponym of the Uerdingen line.

== History ==
The earliest archeological artifacts found in Uerdingen date to the first century CE, and are now found in the British museum. The size and permanence of the associated settlement, however, remain unclear, partly because the site was also a camp for the Roman Legion. Records attest that the commander c. 89 CE was Marcus Hordeonius Flaccus; his nickname ("Castra Ordeonii") has been proposed as an etymon for "Uerdingen".

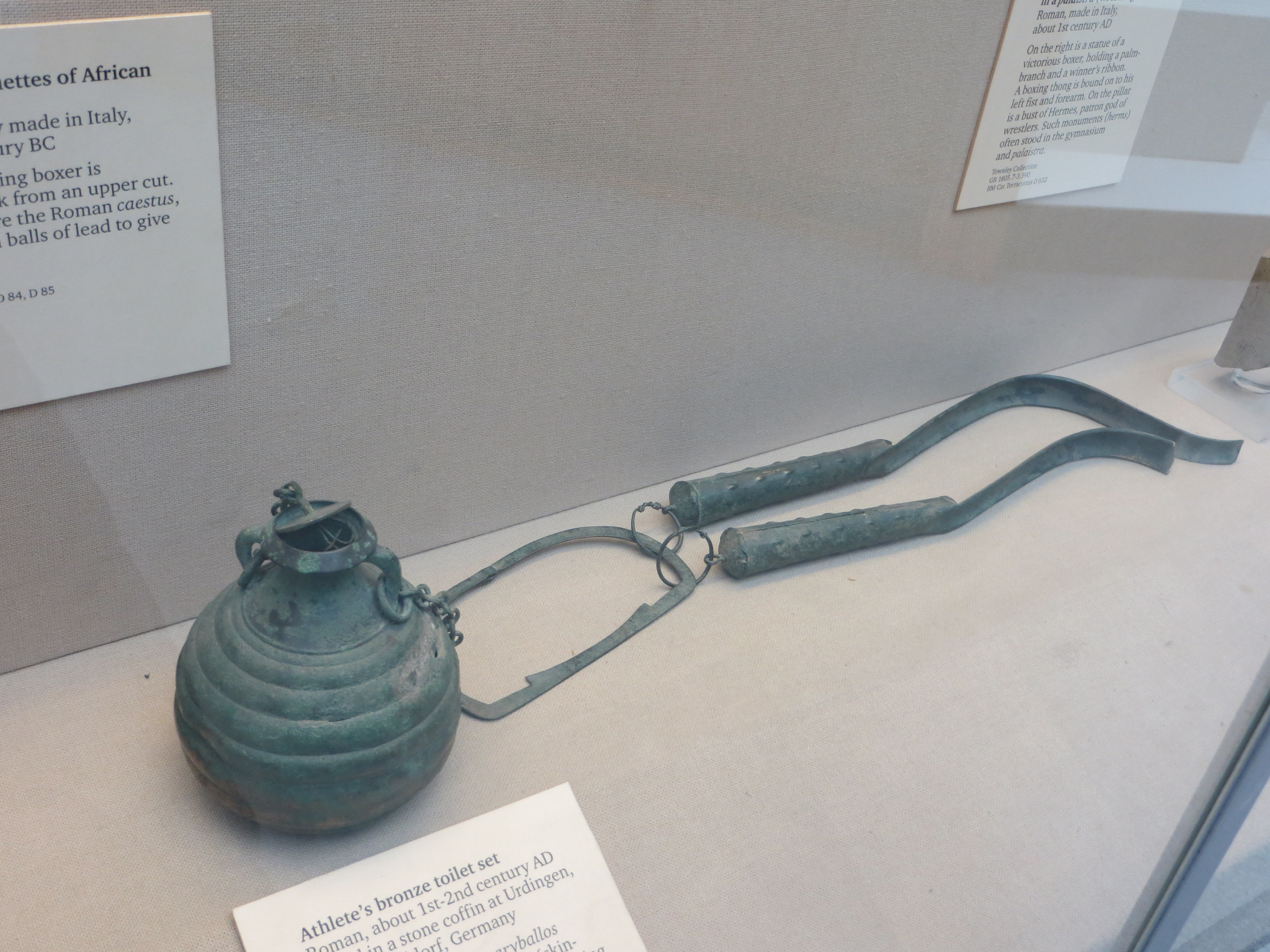
Part of a Roman hoard found in Uerdingen now in the British Museum

The earliest reference to a permanent settlement in the Krefeld-Uerdingen area dates to 809: the city charter for Friemersheim describes a nearby town as "Urdingi". By the mid-thirteenth century, Uerdingen was a thriving port, serving the Rhine river trade as the northernmost exclave of the Electorate of Cologne. In 1255, Uerdingen was granted its first city charter. The town had an inside harbor and special customs office for ships traveling onwards to Cologne. The town was traded between various German noble houses during the late Middle Ages.

By the early modern period, Uerdingen found itself on the front lines of multiple European (and eventually world-wide) conflicts. The town was repeatedly sacked — first in the Cologne War and then the Thirty Years' War, and finally the city was adjacent to Friedrich III's famous Schlacht bei Uerdingen in the War of the League of Augsburg. A witch hunt erupted in 1589, damaging civic spirit during the recovery from the Cologne War. Nonetheless, the city was unharmed in the War of the Spanish Succession, and began to recover throughout the rest of the 18th century. The current town hall dates to 1714–25, immediately following the War of the Spanish Succession.

After the town was damaged in the Rhine floods of 1783-4, Revolutionary French administrators grouped it together with the nearby town of Crefeld. The fates of the two would be ever-closer interlinked from industrialization onwards. In 1929, under the influence of the Prussian minister of the interior, Uerdingen and Krefeld united in a special municipal government giving each urbanity equal rights. The new conglomeration was known as "Krefeld-Uerdingen am Rhein." In April 1940, the Nazi regime eradicated the condominium, and renamed the city plain "Krefeld." The unification was not reverted following the war, to the annoyance of the Uerdingene. Nonetheless, Uerdingen, as a part of the city of Krefeld, retained an unusual special status within Germany. One sign of this can still be seen today in Krefeld's city coat of arms ("Wappen"), which still has the Uerdinger arms in its right half. These last remnants of the medieval period were finally eliminated in the North Rhine-Westphalian reapportionment of 1975.

== Economy ==
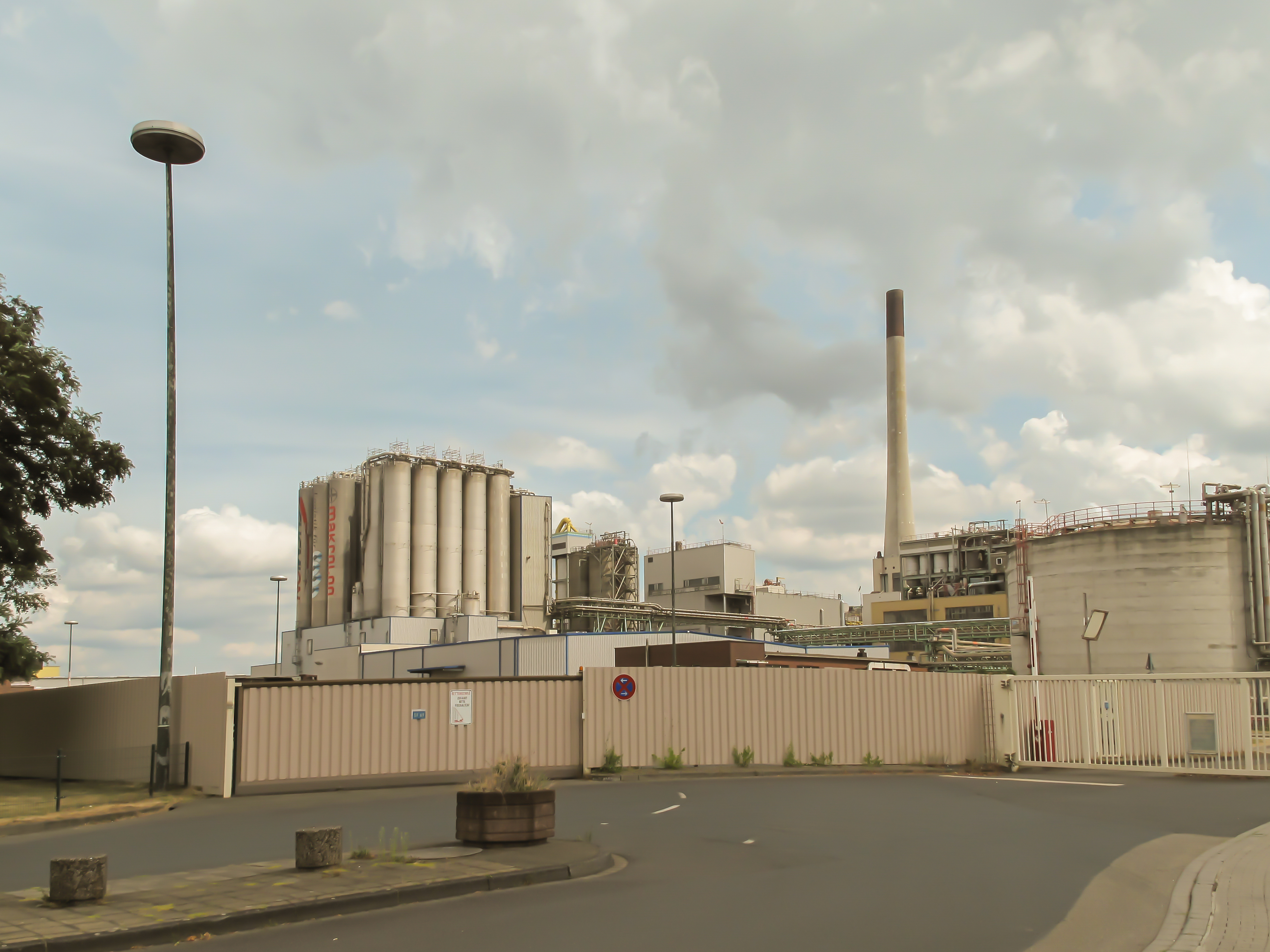
Chempark.

During the 20th century most important employer in Uerdingen (as well in Krefeld) was the Bayer concern. Bayer's second-largest plant was located in the area, and produced synthetics, pigments, and chemical feedstock. In 2004, most of the chemical and approximately a third of synthetic-materials divisions were spun off from Bayer AG. The ex-Bayer plant is now an industrial park home to several chemical companies, none of which are Bayer AG. The area also has the rail car manufacturer Waggonfabrik Uerdingen (founded 1898), formerly Duewag and today Siemens Mobility. This factory is famous for producing the ICE trains for international fleets and the Uerdingen railbus, a type of light locomotive largely for passenger service on branch lines. Finally, Melchers distillery produces the "Uerdinger" brand of gin and a Dujardin Cognac.

== Geography ==
Uerdingen is bounded on its west by the Krefeld city districts of Bockum, Gartenstadt, and Elfrath; on the northwest by Traar; on the north by Duisburg-Rumeln-Kaldenhausen; and on the northeast by Hohenbudberg in the direction of Duisburg-Rheinhausen. To the east of Uerdingen, across the Rhine, lies Duisburg-Mündelheim, and on the south lies the Krefeld city district of Linn.

A landmark of Uerdingen is a bridge over the river Rhine, built in 1936 and a national monument since 1987.

Krefeld-Uerdingen station lies on the Duisburg–Mönchengladbach railway.

== Coat of arms ==
The arms of Uerdingen show the golden keys of Saint Peter upon a divided background, blue above and red below. Blue and red are said to be the colors of Saint Peter, whereby blue would be said to represent heaven and red to symbolize hell. The colors of Uerdingen are likewise blue and red.

== Sport ==
Uerdingen is best known for its tradition-steeped football team F.C. Bayer 05 Uerdingen, now known as KFC Uerdingen 05. The soccer-team plays in Germany's Regionalliga West and was in 1985 winner of the DFB-Pokal against Bayern Munich in Berlin.

== Language ==
Ödingsch, a dialect of Limburgish is still spoken in Uerdingen, a variety known locally as Oedingsch Platt, where oedingsch signifies "of Uerdingen" in the dialect, and Platt being a northern German term for the varieties of Limburgish in general. Oedisch Platt should not be confused with Krieewelsch Platt, the Krefeld Platt variety of Limburgish, as there are small, subtle differences between the two. The best known Uerdingen song in Platt is "Oeding blievt Oeding (os Städtche am Rhien)" by Andreas Otto Kickers, sometimes considered to be the Uerdinger Hymn. The song describes life and history of the city and of its inhabitants. The "Rhienstädter" sing this at all occasions, and thereby cultivate the dialect.

At the northeastern edge of the city runs the isogloss known as the Uerdingen Line.

== Politics ==
Uerdingen voters after World War II were overwhelmingly inclined towards the SPD, the Social Democratic Party of Germany. At both of the most recent municipal elections, however, the CDU, the Christian Democratic Union, received the most votes.

Uerdingen accounts for the largest part of the Bezirksvertretung Uerdingen ("District Representation of Uerdingen"), but the area of the electoral district reaches beyond Uerdingen proper.

District representation since 2014: Total, 15 seats / 100%

- SPD (Social Democrats) (6 seats/40,95 %)
- CDU (Christian Democrats) (5 seats/31,09 %)
- Alliance '90/The Greens (1 seat/9,23 %)
- FDP (liberal) (1 seat/5,7 %)
- The Left (1 seat/4,19 %)
- Alternative for Germany (1 seat/3,99 %)

District manager: Jürgen Hengst (SPD)

== Religion ==
The Uerdingen population adheres largely to Roman Catholicism. There are at present three Catholic churches, as well as a Catholic church in Hohenbudberg and an Evangelical church, as well.

Churches

- Sankt Peter Kirche, Saint Peter's Church (Catholic)
- Sankt Heinrich Kirche, Saint Henry's Church (Catholic)
- Sankt Paul Kirche, Saint Paul's Church (Catholic)
- Sankt Matthias Kirche, Saint Matthew's Church (Catholic)
- Michaelskirche, Michael's Church (Evangelical)
