= Schluff =

Heritage railway in Krefeld, Germany

Coordinates: 51.3437°N 6.5485°E

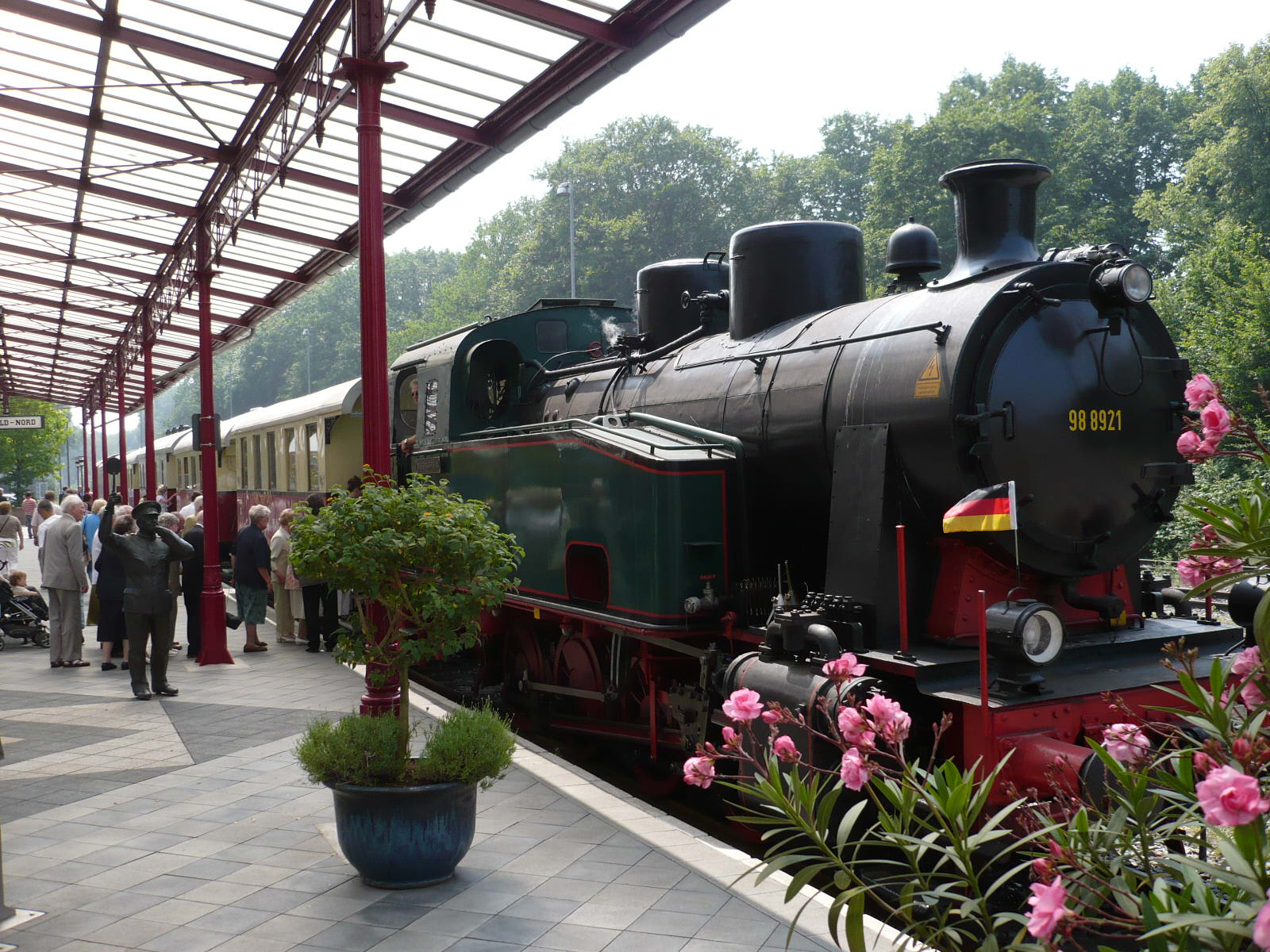
Schluff at Krefeld Nordbahnhof (2008)

Schluff is Krefeld's historic steam locomotive and one of the oldest private railways in Germany.
