= SWK MOBIL =

German public transport operator

SWK MOBIL GmbH
Information
Head offices	St. Töniser Straße 124; 47804 Krefeld www.swk.de
Transport association	Verkehrsverbund Rhein-Ruhr
Ownership	100 % – City of Krefeld
Employees	414 (2016)
Gauge	1000 mm 1435 mm (operated by Rheinbahn)
Lines
Tramway lines	4
Bus lines	23
Vehicles
Tramway	40
Omnibus	100 buses
Statistics
Passengers (per year)	39,2 Mio.
Transport volume (per year)	10,7 Mio. km (2004)

The SWK MOBIL GmbH is a public transport operator in the city of Krefeld, and part of the Viersen district in Western Germany. The company is a fully owned subsidiary of Stadtwerke Krefeld (SWK), offering tramway and bus services. It is a member of both the Verkehrsverbund Rhein-Ruhr (VRR) and the Verkehrsgemeinschaft Niederrhein (VGN) transport associations.
