= Fischeln =

District in Krefeld, Germany

Coordinates: 51°18′N 6°35′E

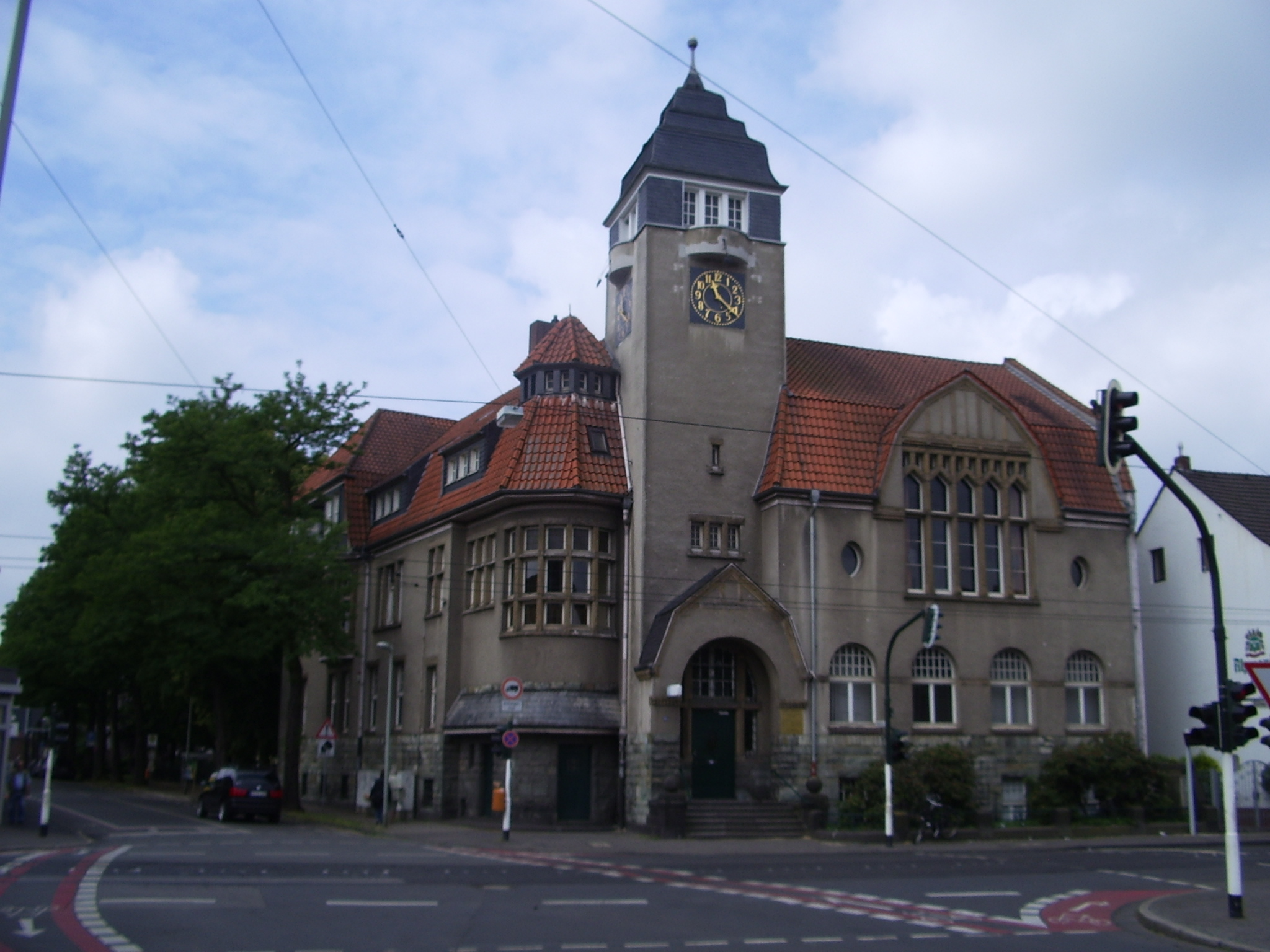
Fischeln town hall, built in 1910

Fischeln is the most southerly district of Krefeld, Germany. Its population is 26,030 (2019) and its area is 18.99 km^{2} (7.33 sq mi). Older than Krefeld, Fischeln was first mentioned as "Viscolo" around 900AD. Fischeln became a district of Krefeld in 1929.

Objects of interest in Fischeln include the church tower of the Saint Clemens church which was erected in 1170AD.
