= Bockum =

- Stadtteil of Krefeld
- Interactive map of Bockum
- Location within Germany Location within North Rhine-Westphalia
- Coordinates: 51°20′N 6°34′E
- Country: Germany
- State: North Rhine-Westphalia
- Admin. region: Düsseldorf
- District: Urban district
- City: Krefeld

Area
  - Total: 8.30 km^{2} (3.20 sq mi)
- Elevation: 35 m (115 ft)

Population (2019-12-31)
  - Total: 20,617
  - Density: 2,480/km^{2} (6,430/sq mi)
- Time zone: UTC+01:00 (CET)
  - Summer (DST): UTC+02:00 (CEST)
- Postal codes: 47800
- Dialling codes: 02151
- Vehicle registration: KR

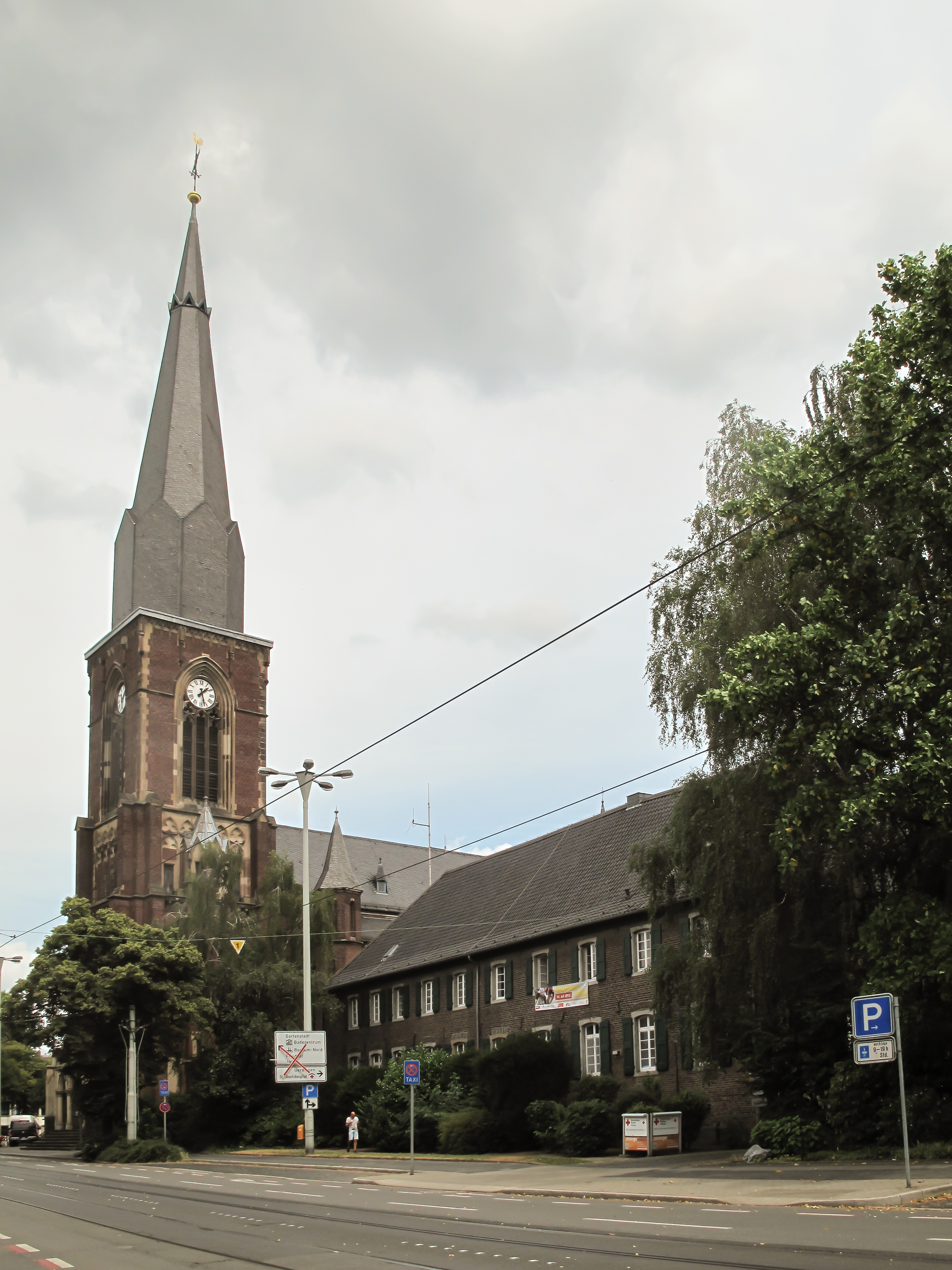
Bockum, church: katholische Pfarrkirche Sankt Gertrudis

Bockum is a northeastern district of Krefeld, North Rhine-Westphalia, Germany. With its large parks, its advantageous location and high housing comfort, it is one of the most favoured residential areas in the city. The center of Bockum is marked by the neogothic church of St. Gertrudis. In addition, the zoo, the Stadtwald, the Grotenburg Stadion and a large swimming facility offer diverse recreational opportunities. The living costs lie in the upper third, with mostly single occupancy housing; the population is considered mostly conservative.

== Places to visit ==
- Haus Sollbrüggen
- Krefeld Zoo
