= Rhein-Niers-Bahn =

RB 33 Rhein-Niers-Bahn
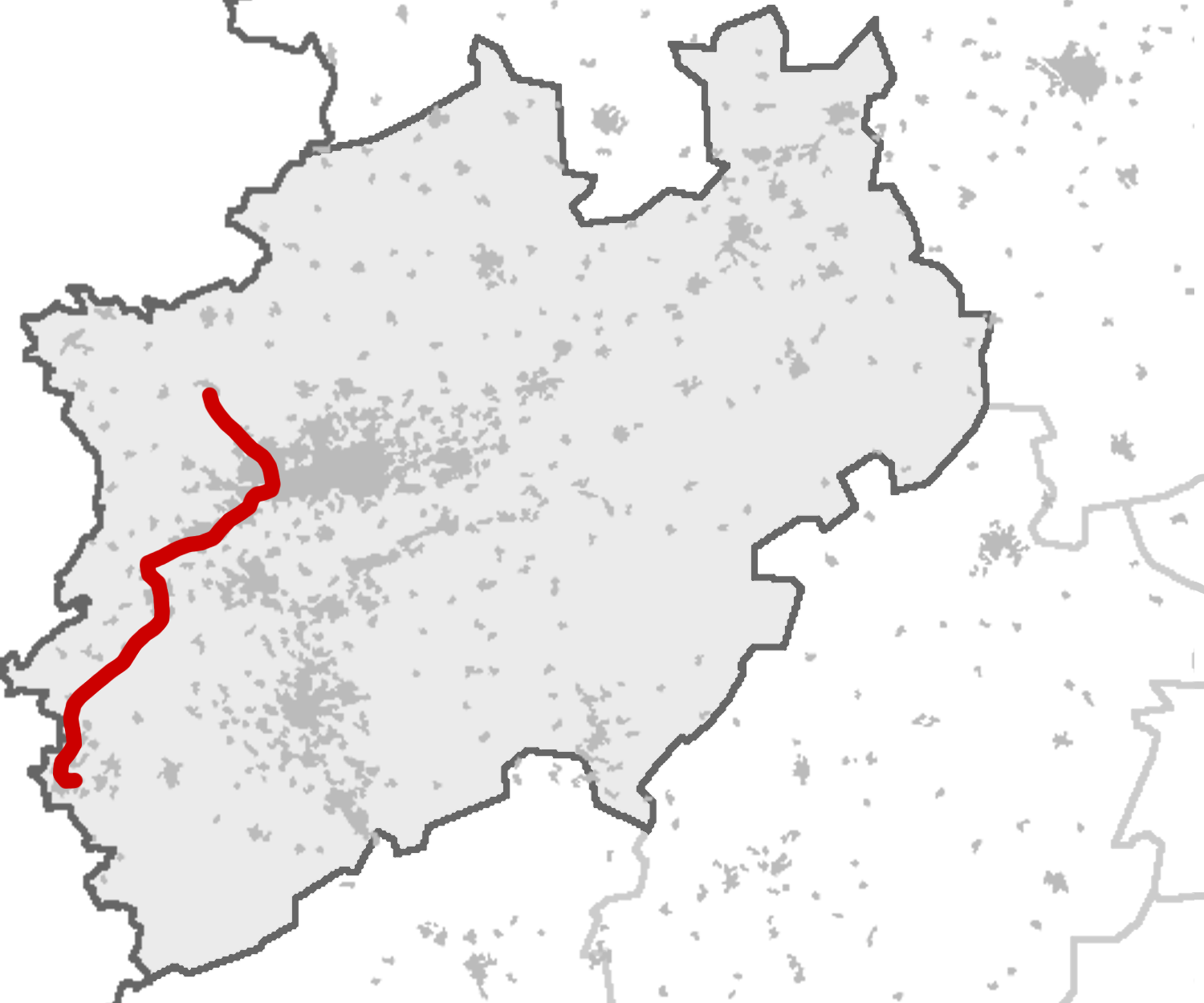

Overview
- Locale: North Rhine-Westphalia, Germany

Technical
- Operating speed: 140 km/h (87 mph) (maximum)
- Timetable number: 420, 425, 485

The Rhine-Niers-Bahn (RB 33) is a Regionalbahn service in the German state of North Rhine-Westphalia. It connects Essen Hbf, Duisburg Hbf on the Rhine with Mönchengladbach on the Niers, Aachen and Heinsberg (sections of timetable routes 420, 425 and 485).

== Operations ==
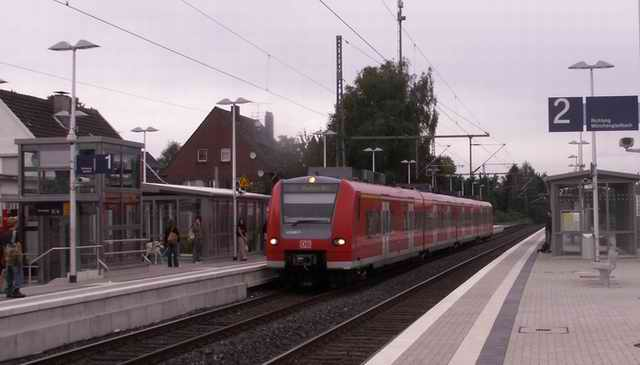
ET 425 set in Erkelenz station

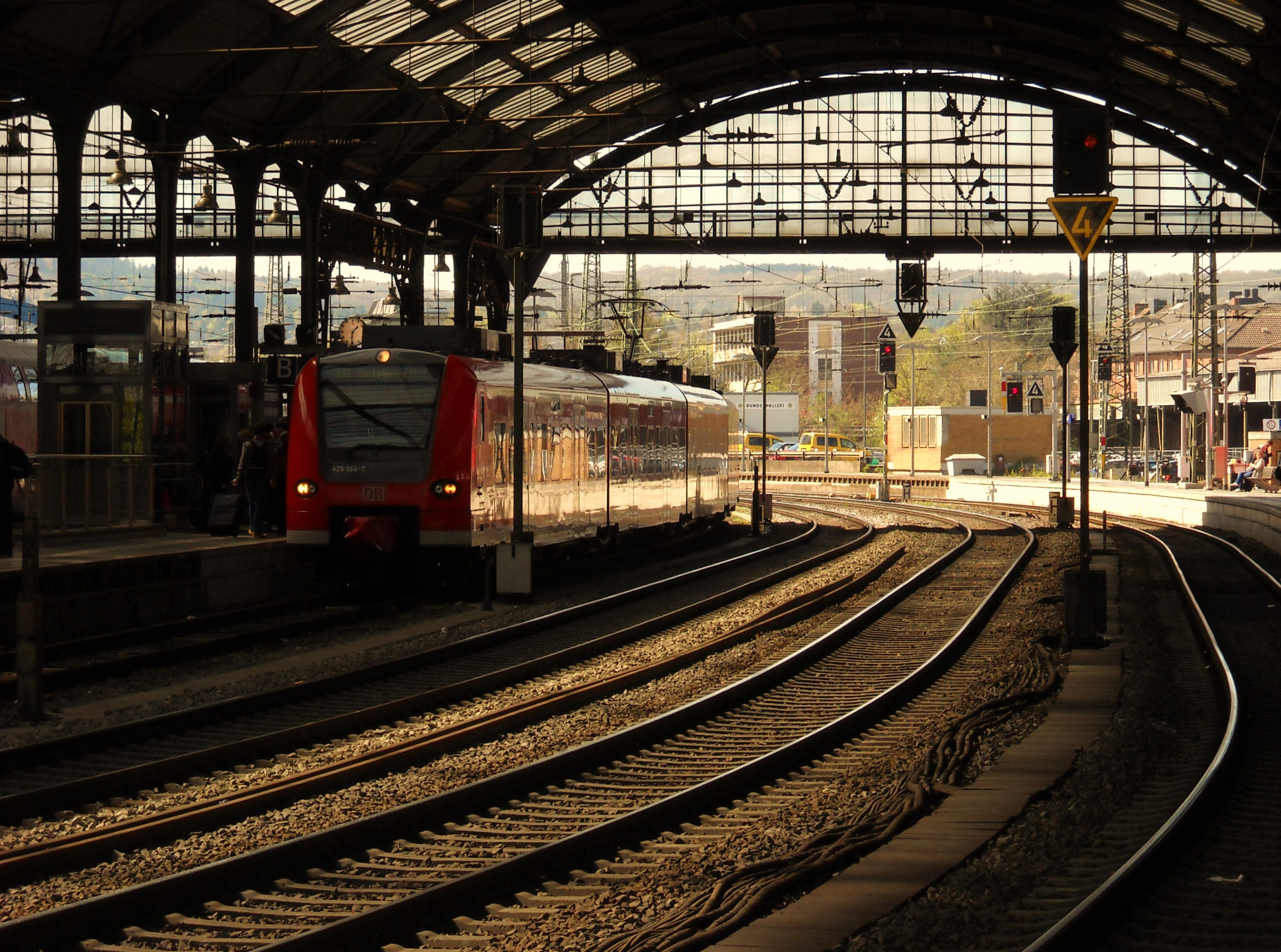
RB service in Aachen Central Station

The service runs every hour between Essen and Aachen. In Lindern station between Mönchengladbach and Aachen, trains running from Aachen are uncoupled. The front section of the train continues as before running towards Mönchengladbach, while the rear section of the train is uncoupled and reverses to run towards Heinsberg. On the way back it is again coupled with a set coming from Mönchengladbach and continues as a coupled set towards Aachen.

Class 425 and class 426 electric multiple units are usually used on the line as double sets. In exceptional cases (e.g. in case of problems with EMUS during the leaf-fall season) push–pull trains, consisting of Silberling carriages and a class 111 locomotive are used. The service is operated by DB Regio–Region NRW.

== History ==
At first, the service only ran between Wesel or Duisburg and Mönchengladbach. It was created at the timetable change in December 2002 as an extension to Duisburg of the Mönchengladbach–Aachen section of the Grenzlandbahn ("border land railway"), which until then had started in Mönchengladbach, where it connected with the Rhein-Emscher-Express, and run via Aachen over the Cologne–Aachen railway to Köln Messe/Deutz station as route RB 21.

This resulted in the following method of operations, which operated until December 2016. The line was formed of two hourly services, which were offset by about 30 minutes:

1. Wesel–Duisburg–Krefeld–Mönchengladbach
2. Duisburg–Krefeld–Mönchengladbach–Lindern–Aachen; this includes a portion that is worked between Heinsberg and Lindern.

This meant there were services every 30 minutes on the section between Duisburg and Mönchengladbach. From December 2016 the Wesel–Duisburg–Krefeld–Mönchengladbach service has been operated as the Emscher-Niederrhein-Bahn (RB 35).

The 1998 transport plan of the state of North Rhine-Westphalia and the resolution adopting it provided for the renaming of the Rhine-Nier-Bahn. It would operate from 2015 on the Wesel–Duisburg section as S-Bahn line S 20, which would continue from Duisburg towards Düsseldorf. On the Wickrathberg–Duisburg section, the Rhine-Nier-Bahn would from no later than 2015 run as the S 21, which would continue from Duisburg to Kamen. There was no provision in the plan for adoption of the Aachen–Wickrathberg section into the S-Bahn network. These plans were not implemented.

On 1 March 2008, the AVV published the Zukunftskonzept 2015 (future concept 2015), which envisaged the Rhein-Niers-Bahn (RB 33) being operated from both Duisburg and Mönchengladbach and Heinsberg to Aachen via Lindern. Thus, the Rhein-Niers-Bahn would take over operations on the Heinsberg–Lindern railway, with services to be operated by Euregiobahn under contract. The final plans ultimately provided for portion working, in which two units of class 425 sets running from Aachen in double traction would be uncoupled. This concept was finally implemented at the timetable change on 15 December 2013.

The existing stop in Kohlscheid station was deleted with the introduction of the new timetable. However, the stop at Kohlscheid station was restored at the timetable change on 13 December 2015 at the request of many customers.

Since the timetable change on 11 December 2016, a double set consisting of a class 425 (running to Duisburg) and a class 426 (running to Heinsberg) has been used as a rule. The Rhein-Niers-Bahn was extended to Essen Hauptbahnhof via Mülheim on 15 December 2019.

== Route ==
The Regionalbahn service runs over the full length of the following railway lines:

- the Duisburg-Ruhrort–Mönchengladbach railway,
- the Aachen–Mönchengladbach railway and
- the Lindern–Heinsberg railway.

The former northern section of the line also operated over:

- the Oberhausen–Arnhem railway between Wesel and Oberhausen,
- the Duisburg–Dortmund railway between Oberhausen and Duisburg and
- the Dortmund–Duisburg railway between Duisburg and Essen.

== See also ==
- List of regional rail lines in North Rhine-Westphalia
