= Duisburg-Ruhrort–Mönchengladbach railway =

Railway line in North Rhine-Westphalia, Germany

Duisburg-Ruhrort–Mönchengladbach
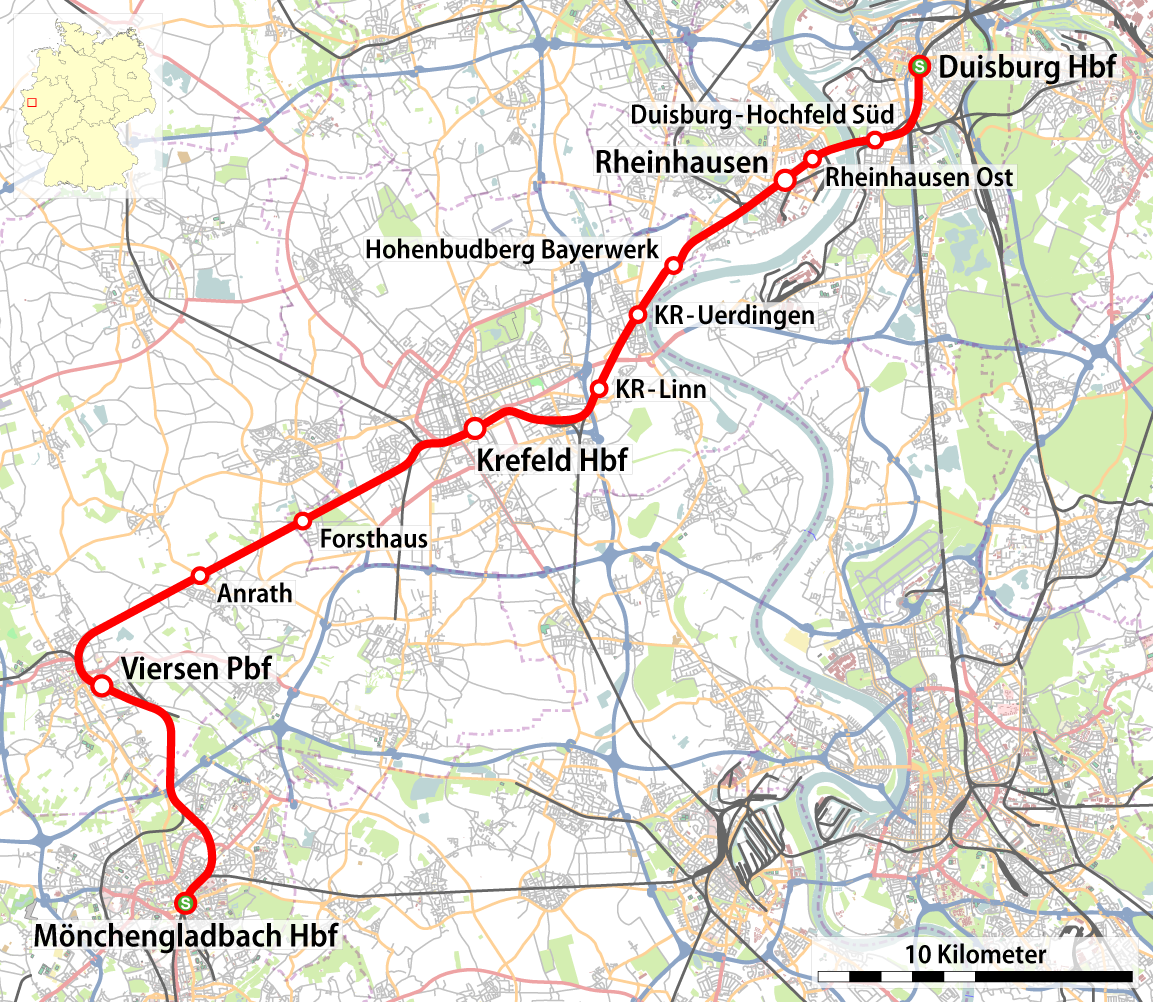

Overview
- Line number: 2332 (Duisburg-Homberg–Duisburg-Trompet); 2 (old route number, but disputed) (Duisburg-Trompet–Krefeld-Uerdingen); 2520 (Krefeld-Uerdingen–Mönchengladbach)
- Locale: North Rhine-Westphalia

Service
- Route number: 490 (Duisburg–Mönchengladbach); 485 (Viersen–Mönchengladbach)

Technical
- Line length: 42 km (26 mi)
- Track gauge: 1,435 mm (4 ft 8 1/2 in) standard gauge
- Operating speed: 120 km/h (75 mph) (maximum)

The Duisburg-Ruhrort–Mönchengladbach railway is a historically significant, but now partly abandoned line in the German state of North Rhine-Westphalia. The line was built by the Ruhrort-Crefeld District Gladbach Railway Company (German: Ruhrort–Crefeld−Kreis Gladbach Eisenbahngesellschaft, RCG), founded in 1847, and is one of the oldest lines in Germany, opened in 1849 and 1851.

The greater part of the route, along with the western section of the Ruhr line of the Rhenish Railway Company (Rheinische Eisenbahn-Gesellschaft, RhE), forms the Duisburg–Mönchengladbach line, one of the main line in Germany’s lower Rhine region, connecting the stations of Duisburg and Mönchengladbach.

== History ==
The Ruhrort-Crefeld District Gladbach railway was established to bring coal mined in the Ruhr district to consumers in the Lower Rhine region. The RCG therefore concluded a contract with the Cologne-Minden Railway Company (CME), which at that time was the only railway company then operating in the northern Ruhr area. The CME built a branch from Oberhausen to Ruhrort from its trunk line, which was opened on 14 October 1848.

The RCG began construction of its line to a point located exactly opposite Ruhrort on the bank of the Rhine in Homberg, now part of the city of Duisburg. The Ruhrort–Homberg train ferry commenced services to Ruhrort station on the east bank of the Rhine on 12 November 1852, carrying carriages and freight wagons over the river. On 15 October 1849, the line was opened from Homberg to Viersen via Trompet, Kaldenhausen, Uerdingen and Crefeld. the final leg to Gladbach (now Mönchengladbach) was completed two years later to the day, on 15 October 1851. In 1853 railway lines were opened to Aachen and to Düsseldorf by the Aachen-Neuß-Düsseldorf Railway Company (Aachen-Neuß-Düsseldorfer Eisenbahngesellschaft, AND).

On 1 April 1850, even before it had completed its line, the RCG, together with the AND, was nationalised by the Prussian government and became part of the Royal Directorate of the Aachen-Düsseldorf-Ruhrort Railway Company (Königliche Direction der Aachen-Düsseldorf-Ruhrorter Eisenbahn). On 1 January 1866 this company was taken over by the Bergisch-Märkische Railway Company (BME), which was also mostly state-owned.

The BME opened a line in 1862 from Mülheim-Styrum station on its Witten/Dortmund–Oberhausen/Duisburg line to Duisburg-Ruhrort and remarked the distances along its track in kilometres from Aachen RHE station (km 0.0) to Dortmund (km 164.3).

=== Partial closure ===
In 1873 the RhE replaced its original Rheinhausen–Hochfeld train ferry by the Duisburg-Hochfeld rail bridge. Subsequently the Ruhrort–Homberg ferry quickly lost traffic. In consequence, the line between Duisburg-Homberg and Hohenbudberg became increasingly unimportant.

The Ruhrort–Homberg ferry closed on 19 May 1907. The railway line between Homberg and Trompet was damaged in the Second World War and not returned to service. Today, the only traffic north of Trompet is to the siding of the Sachtleben Chemie company.

The opening of the Lower Rhine line in 1904 established a connection between Rheinhausen and Trompet (continuing via Moers to Kleve), which proved to be more profitable, especially as it included a direct rail link to the Hohenbudberg marshalling yard. The original line between Trompet and Uerdingen was eventually closed for passenger on 30 September 1961; the closure of freight traffic followed a day later, on 1 October 1961.

=== Realignment in Viersen ===
In 1917 the current track in the Viersen area was laid. Originally the line ran from the location of the modern Viersen-Helenabrunn station initially parallel to the line that is now the Mönchengladbach freight bypass (originally opened in 1909) and then running directly between Helenabrunn and Heimer (now suburbs of Viersen) to Viersen BME station. Helenabrunn station was in the higher part of Helenabrunn and Heimer. The line was moved further north, where it connected with the Neuss–Viersen line, which was originally built by the Rhenish Railway Company (Rheinische Eisenbahn-Gesellschaft, RhE), to run to Viersen RhE station (now Viersen station). After the realignment, the BME station was abandoned and demolished. As a replacement for the Helenabrunn station, Viersen-Helenabrunn station (originally Helenabrunn) was built in Neuwerker Straße on the outskirts of modern Mönchengladbach.

== Current situation ==
Although the first section of the line from Homberg to Hohenbudberg no longer exists, the greater part of the line is still in operation. Together with the western part of the Osterath–Dortmund Süd line of the former Rhenish Railway Company and its branch line from Duisburg RHE station—now part of Duisburg Hauptbahnhof—it has developed into a major regional route. The main line from Duisburg Hauptbahnhof via Duisburg-Hochfeld Süd and Hohenbudberg to Mönchengladbach Hbf is now consistently double track and electrified.

Lack of modernisation prevents more intensive use of the line; between Duisburg Hauptbahnhof and Rheinhausen only four trains per hour can operate, one of which continues towards Moers and Xanten on the Lower Rhine line. Furthermore, the line’s tracks cross the tracks of the Lower Left Rhine line on the level in the vicinity of Krefeld station. There is a similar crossing on the level with the Mönchengladbach–Düsseldorf line near Mönchengladbach station.

=== Rail services ===
The line is served every hour by a Regional-Express service, the Niers-Haard-Express (RE 42), connecting Mönchengladbach and the Lower Rhine to the western and central Ruhr area and Münster.

Only slightly slower are two Regionalbahn services, the Rhein-Niers-Bahn (RB 33) from Aachen via Mönchengladbach and Duisburg to Essen and the Emscher-Niederrhein-Bahn (RB 35), connecting Mönchengladbach, Duisburg and Gelsenkirchen, both running hourly.

=== Fares ===
Fares for the entire route are set by the Rhine-Ruhr public transport association (Verkehrsverbund Rhein-Ruhr, VRR).
