= Interurban =

Type of electric railway which runs within and between cities or towns

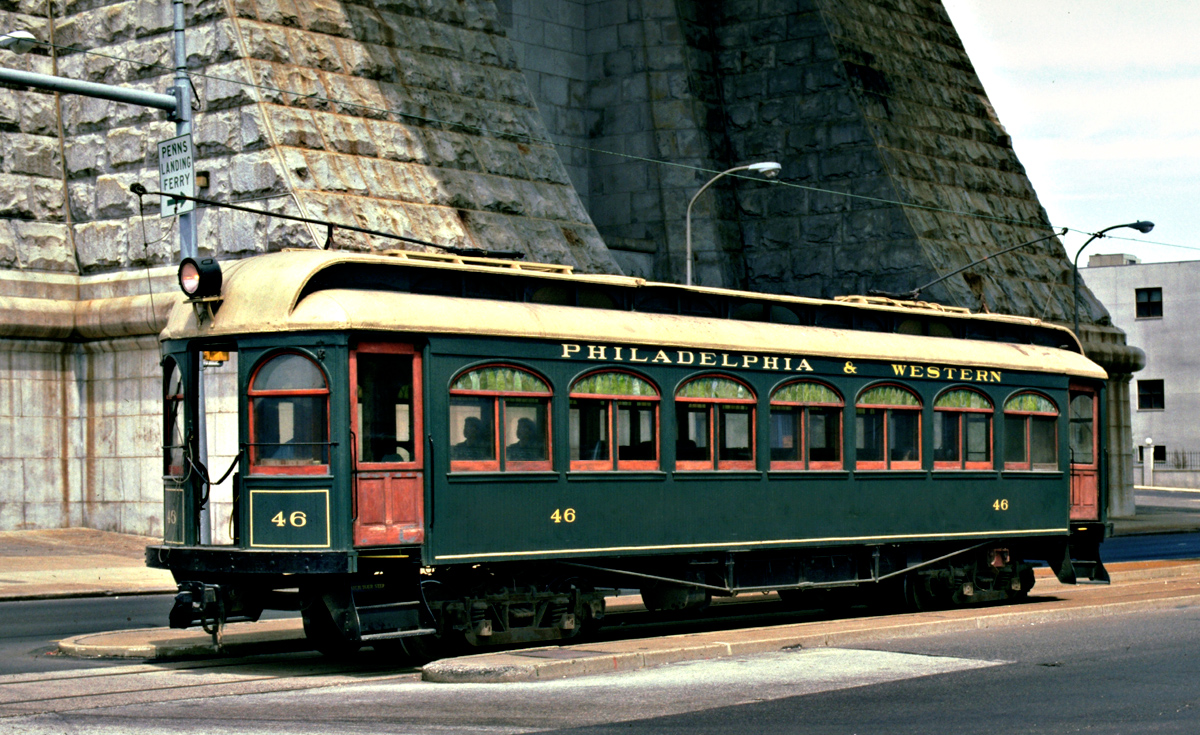
An interurban car from the Philadelphia & Western Railroad, which survived long in the interurban business

An interurban or radial railway (Note: interurban is the more common term in the United States, and radial railway is the more common term in Canada) is a type of electric railway, with tram-like electric self-propelled railcars which run within and between cities or towns. The term interurban is usually used in North America, with other terms used outside it. They were very prevalent in many parts of the world before the Second World War and were used primarily for passenger travel between cities and their surrounding suburban and rural communities. Interurban as a term encompassed the companies, their infrastructure, their cars that ran on the rails, and their service. In the United States, the early 1900s interurban was a valuable economic institution when most roads between towns, many town streets were unpaved, and transportation and haulage was by horse-drawn carriages and carts.

The interurban provided reliable transportation, particularly in winter weather, between towns and countryside. In 1915, 15,500 miles (24,900 km) of interurban railways were operating in the United States and, for a few years, interurban railways, including the numerous manufacturers of cars and equipment, were the fifth-largest industry in the country. With the widespread use of automobiles, most interurbans in North America had stopped operating by 1930. A few survived into the 1950s.

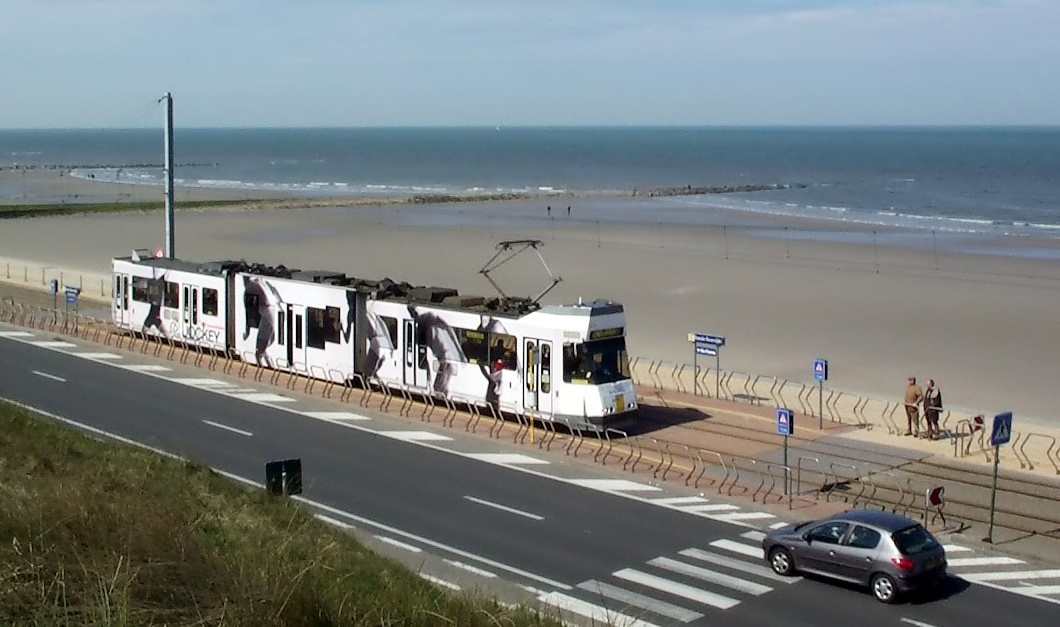
Kusttram, The Belgian Coast Tram, is a European interurban tramway.

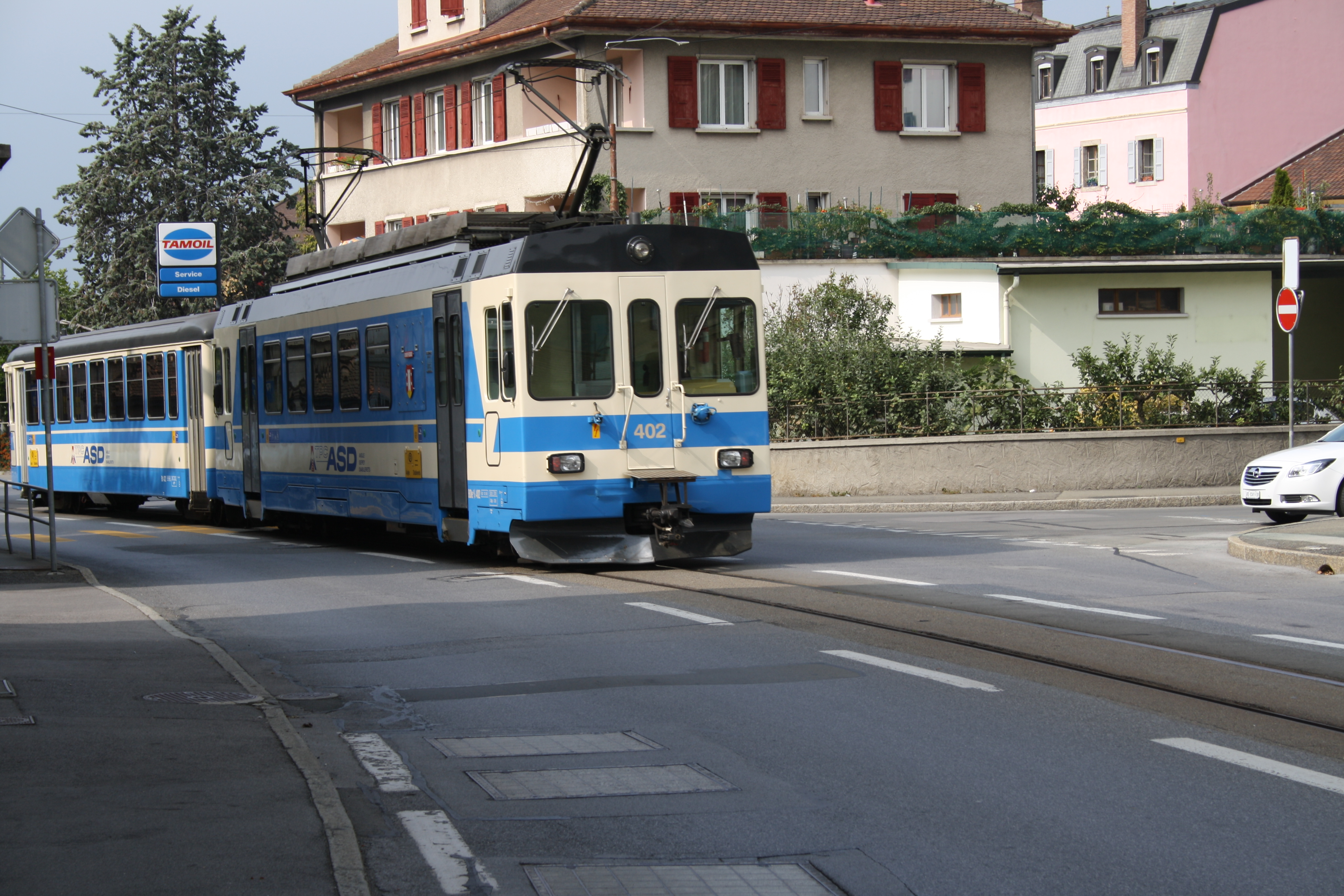
Aigle–Sépey–Diablerets railway line in Switzerland

Outside of the US, other countries built large networks of high-speed electric tramways that survive today. Notable systems exist in the Low Countries, Poland, and Japan, where populations are densely packed around large conurbations such as the Randstad, Upper Silesia, Greater Tokyo Area, and Keihanshin. Switzerland, particularly, has a large network of mountain narrow-gauge interurban lines.

In addition, since the early 21st century many tram-train lines are being built, especially in France and Germany but also elsewhere in the world. These can be regarded as interurbans since they run on the streets, like trams, when in cities, while out of them they either share existing railway lines or use lines that were abandoned by the railway companies.

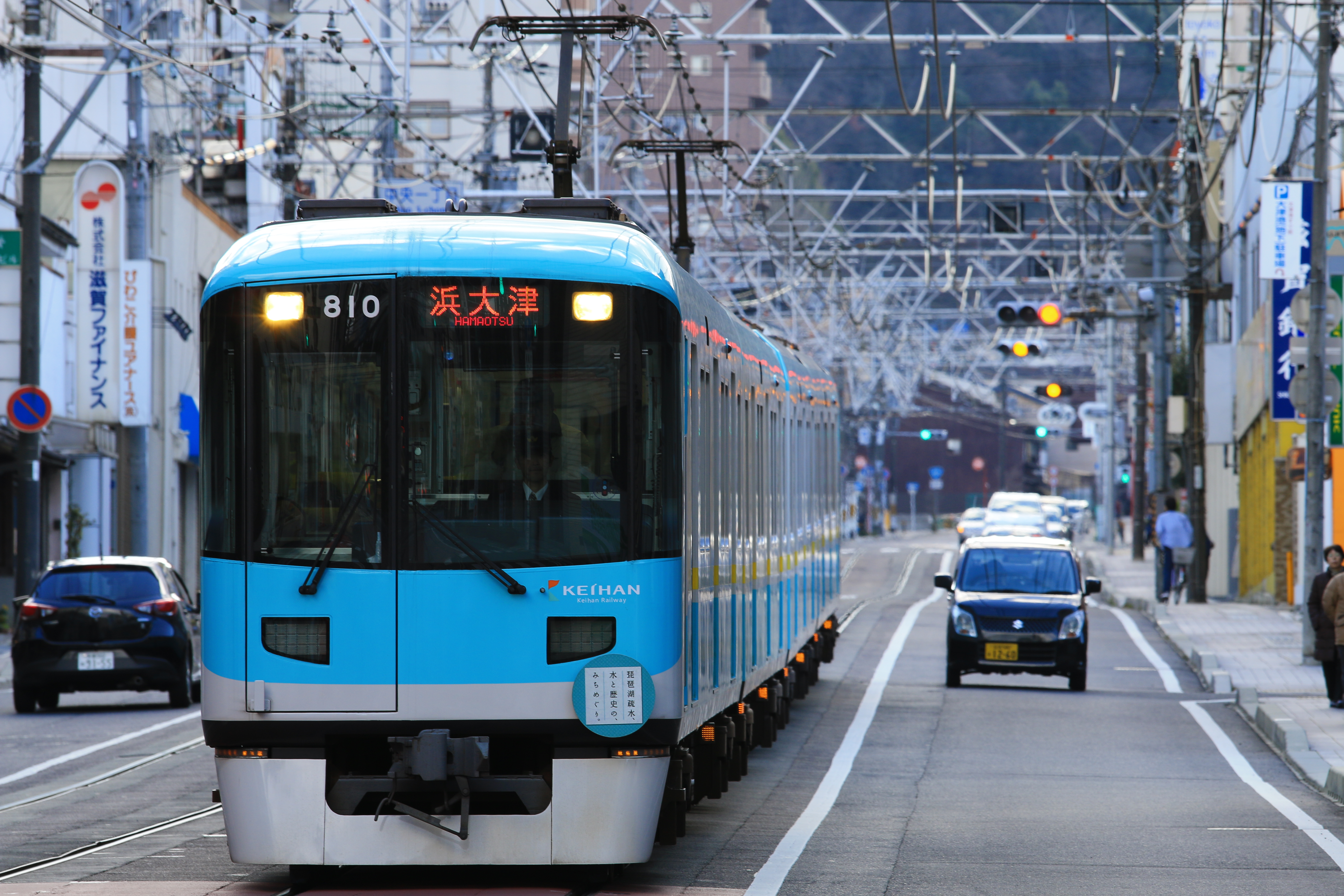
The Keihan Keishin Line is a Japanese interurban.

== Definition ==
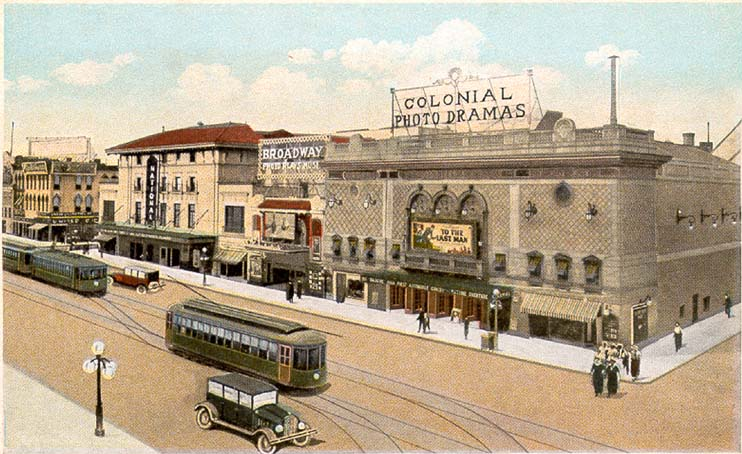
Postcard of electric trolley-powered streetcars in Richmond, Virginia, in 1923, two generations after Frank J. Sprague successfully demonstrated his new system on the hills in 1888. The intersection shown is at 8th & Broad streets.

The term interurban was coined by Charles L. Henry, a state senator in Indiana. The Latin, inter urbes, means "between cities". The interurban fit on a continuum between urban street railways and full-fledged railroads. George W. Hilton and John F. Due, looking back on the interurbans in 1960, identified four characteristics of an interurban:

- Electric power for propulsion
- Passenger service as the primary business
- Equipment heavier and faster than urban streetcars
- Operation on tracks in city streets, and in rural areas on roadside tracks or private rights-of-way

The definition of interurban is necessarily blurry. Some town streetcar lines evolved into interurban systems by extending streetcar track from the town into the countryside to link adjacent towns together and sometimes by the acquisition of a nearby interurban system. Following initial construction, there was a large amount of consolidation of lines. Other interurban lines effectively became light rail systems with no street running whatsoever or they became primarily freight-hauling railroads because of a progressive loss of their initial passenger service over the years.

In 1905, the United States Census Bureau defined an interurban as "a street railway having more than half its trackage outside municipal limits". It drew a distinction between interurban and suburban railroads. A suburban system was oriented toward a city center in a single urban area and served commuter traffic. A regular railroad moved riders from one city center to another city center and also moved a substantial amount of freight.

The typical interurban similarly served more than one city, but it served a smaller region and made more frequent stops, and was oriented to passenger rather than freight service.

== History ==
=== Emergence ===
==== United States ====
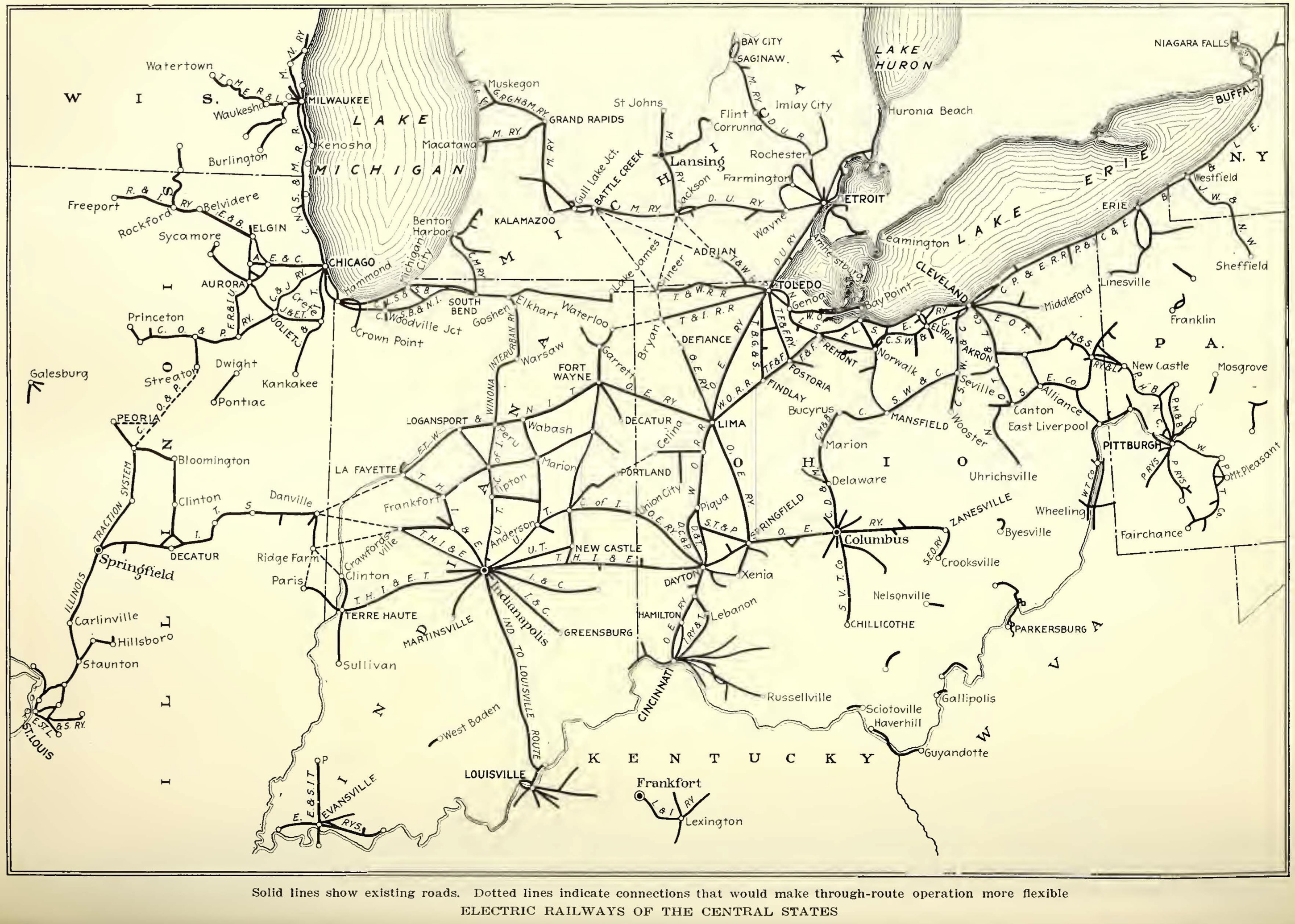
Ohio and Indiana had the greatest mileage of interurbans in the United States, at 2,798 miles (4,503 km) and 1,825 miles (2,937 km), respectively. This map shows the network across the Midwestern United States in 1918.

The development of interurbans in the late 19th century resulted from the convergence of two trends: improvements in electric traction and an untapped demand for transportation in rural areas, particularly in the Midwestern United States. The 1880s saw the first successful deployments of electric traction in streetcar systems. Most of these built on the pioneering work of Frank J. Sprague, who had developed an improved method for mounting an electric traction motor and using a trolley pole for pickup. Sprague's work led to widespread acceptance of electric traction for streetcar operations and the end of horse-drawn trams.

The late 19th-century United States witnessed a boom in agriculture that lasted through the World War I, but transportation in rural areas was inadequate. Conventional steam railroads made limited stops, mostly in towns. These were supplemented by horse and buggies and steamboats, both of which were slow and the latter of which were restricted to navigable rivers. The increased capacity and profitability of the city street railroads offered the possibility of extending them into the countryside to reach new markets, even linking to other towns. The first interurban to emerge in the United States was the Newark and Granville Street Railway in Ohio, which opened in 1889. It was not a major success, but others followed. The development of the automobile was then in its infancy, and to many investors interurbans appeared to be the future of local transportation.

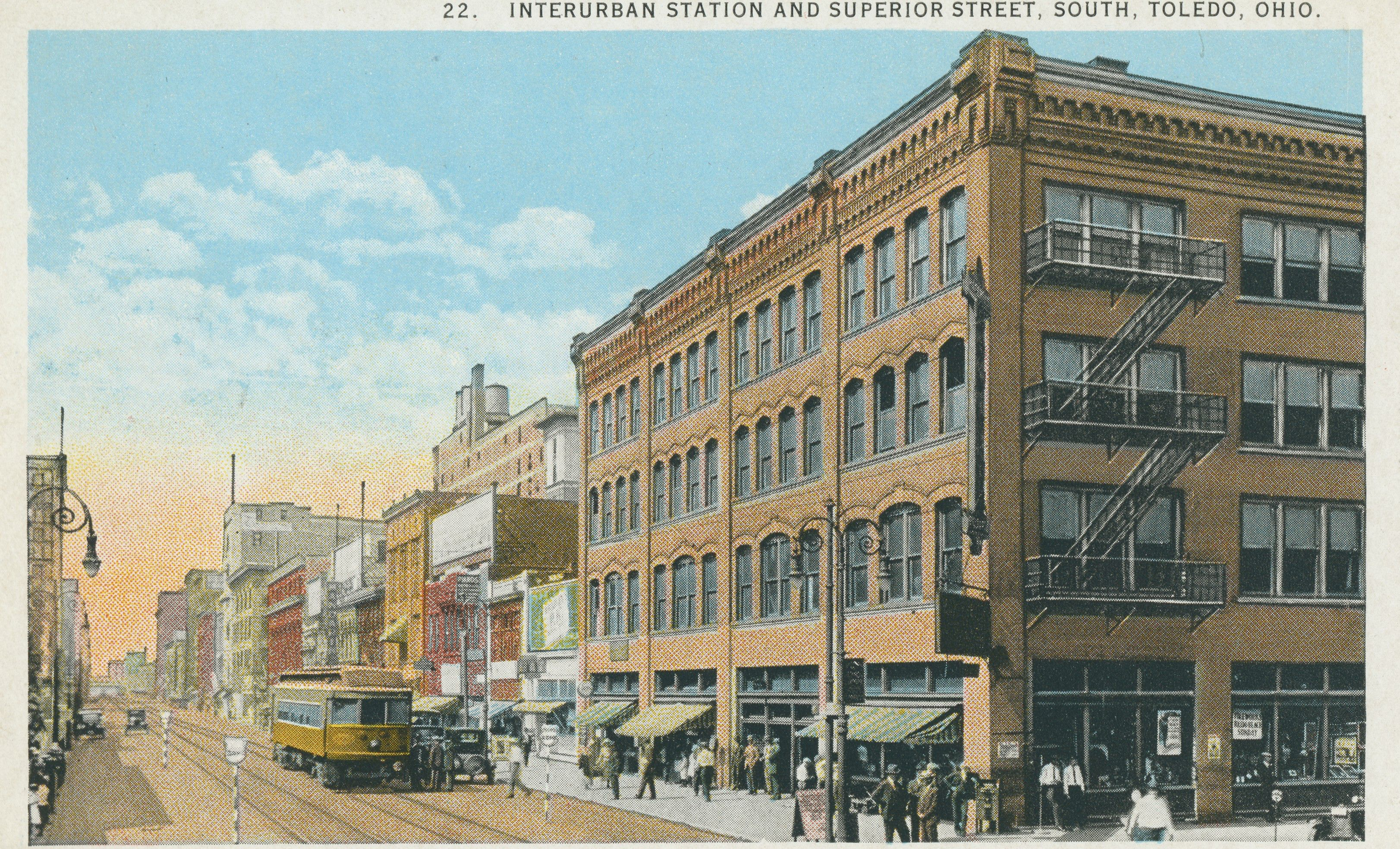
Interurban Station and Superior Street, Toledo, Ohio

From 1900 to 1916, large networks of interurban lines were constructed across the United States, particularly in the states of Indiana, Ohio, Pennsylvania, Illinois, Iowa, Utah, and California. In 1900, 2,107 miles (3,391 km) of interurban track existed, but by 1916, this had increased to 15,580 miles (25,070 km), a seven-fold expansion. Beginning in 1901, it was possible to travel from Elkhart Lake, Wisconsin, to Little Falls, New York, exclusively by interurban. During this expansion, "...they almost destroyed the local passenger service of the steam railroad" in the regions where they operated, particularly in Ohio and Indiana. To show how exceptionally busy the interurbans radiating from Indianapolis were in 1926, the immense Indianapolis Traction Terminal (nine roof covered tracks and loading platforms) scheduled 500 trains in and out daily and moved 7 million passengers that year. At their peak the interurbans were the fifth-largest industry in the United States.

==== Europe ====
In Belgium, a sprawling, nation-wide system of narrow-gauge vicinal tramways were built by the NMVB / SNCV to provide transport to smaller towns across the country; the first section opened in 1885. These lines were either electrically operated or run with diesel tramcars, included numerous street-running sections, and inter-operated with local tram networks in the larger cities. Similar to Belgium, a large network of interurbans was constructed in the Netherlands in the late 1800s and early 1900s called streektramlijnen, though mostly by private enterprises.

In Silesia, today Poland, an extensive interurban system was constructed, starting in 1894 with a narrow-gauge line connecting Gliwice with Piekary Śląskie through Zabrze, Chebzie, Chorzów, and Bytom; another connected Katowice and Siemianowice. After four years, in 1898, Kramer & Co. was chosen to start electrification on Katowice Rynek (Kattowitz, Ring) - Zawodzie line, after which Schikora & Wolff completed electrification of four additional lines. In 1912, the first short 4 ft 8 1/2 in (1,435 mm) standard gauge line was built in Katowice. In 1913, a separate standard gauge system connecting Bytom with suburbs and villages west of the town was launched. After World War I and the Silesian Uprisings, in 1922 the region (and the tram network) was divided between the newly independent Poland and Germany, and international services appeared (the last one ran until 1937). In 1928, further standard gauge systems were established in Sosnowiec, Będzin, and Dąbrowa Górnicza (the so-called Dabrowa Coal Basin - a region adjoining the Upper Silesian Coal Basin). Between 1928 and 1936 most of the original narrow gauge network was converted to standard, which allowed a connection with the new system in Sosnowiec. By 1931, 47,5% of the narrow-gauge network was reconstructed, with 20 kilometres (12 mi) of new standard-gauge track built.

A large network of interurbans started developing around Milan in the late 1800s; they were originally drawn by horses and later powered as steam trams. These initial interurban lines were gradually upgraded with electric traction in the early 1900s with some assistance from Thomas Edison. By the 1930s a vast network of interurbans, the Società Trazione Elettrica Lombarda, connected Milan with surrounding towns.

In the first half of the 20th century, an extensive tramway network covered Northern England, centered on South Lancashire and West Yorkshire. At that time, it was possible to travel entirely by tram from Liverpool Pier Head to the village of Summit, outside Rochdale, a distance of 52 miles (84 km), and with a short 7 miles (11 km) bus journey across the Pennines, to connect to another tram network that linked Huddersfield, Halifax, and Leeds.

==== Asia ====
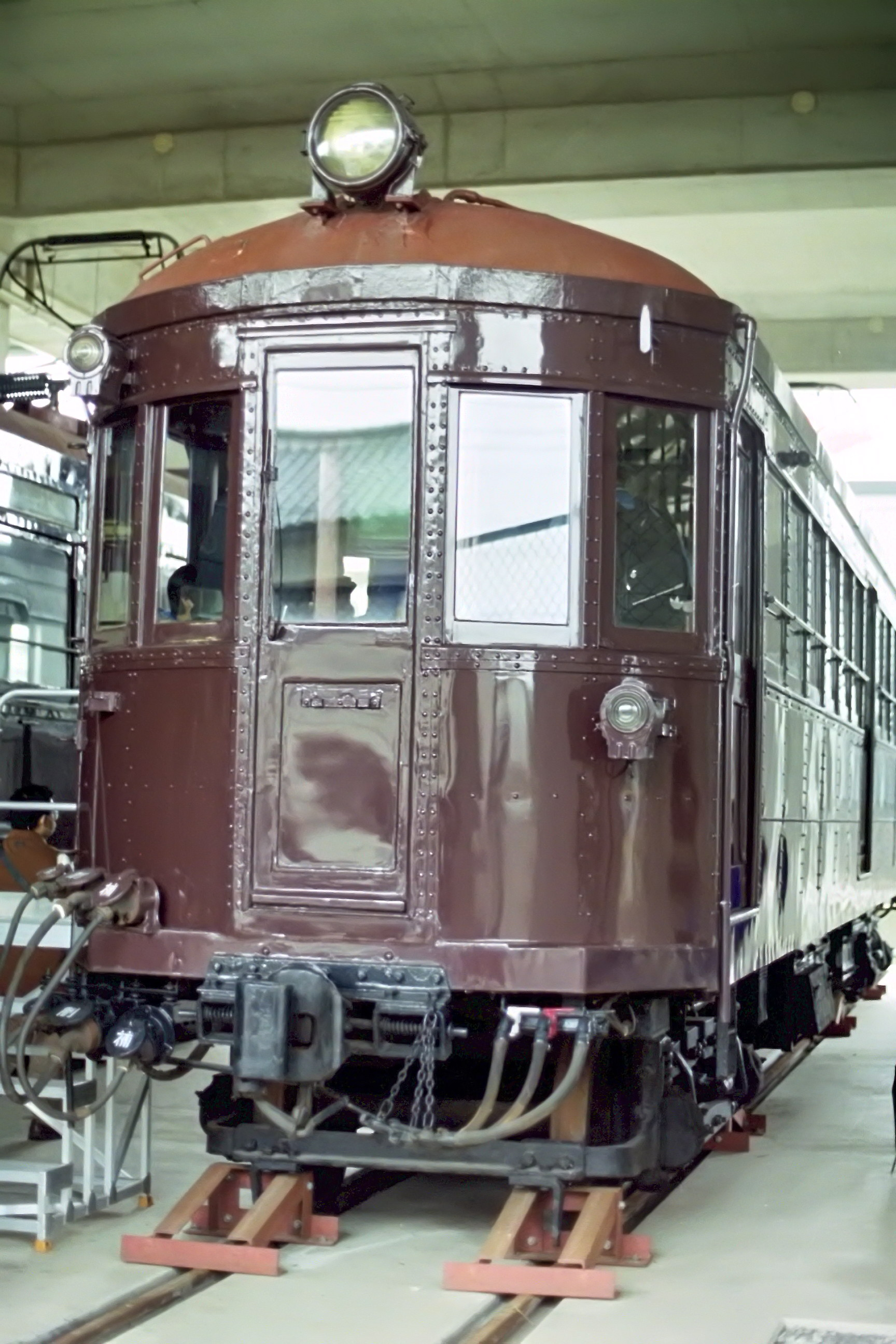
A preserved Hanshin Electric Railway Type 601 car

The first interurban railway in Japan was the Hanshin Electric Railway, built to compete with mainline steam trains on the Osaka to Kobe corridor and completed in 1905. As laws of that time did not allow parallel railways to be built, the line was legally defined as a tramway and included street running at the two ends, but was based on American interurbans and operated with large tramcars on mostly private right-of-way. In the same year, the Keihin Express Railway, or Keikyu, completed a section of what is today part of the Keikyū Main Line between Shinagawa, Tokyo, and Kanagawa, Yokohama. This line competes with mainline Japanese National Railways on this busy corridor. Predecessors of the Meitetsu opened their first interurban lines in 1912, what today form parts of the Meitetsu Inuyama Line and Tsushima Line. In 1913, the first section of what will become the Keiō Line opened connecting Chōfu to just outside Shinjuku with street running on what is today the Kōshū Kaidō or National Route 20. Kyushu Electric Railroad, predecessor to Nishitetsu opened its first interurban line in 1914 serving Kitakyushu and surrounding areas, taking heavy inspiration from Hanshin Electric Railway.

=== Diverging fortunes ===
==== Decline in North America ====
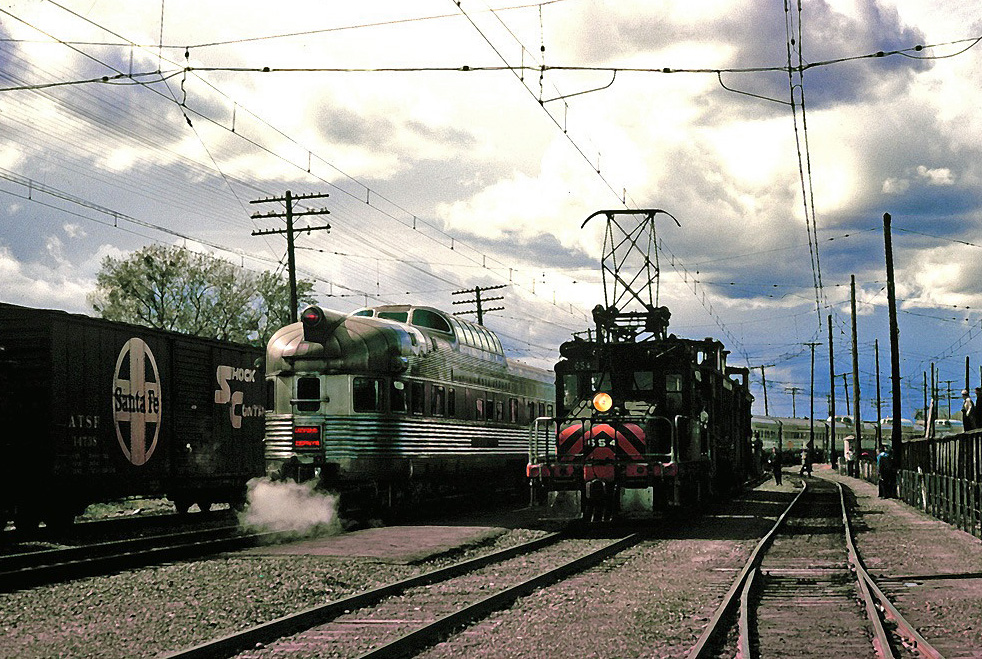
The last day of electric operation on the Sacramento Northern Railway, February 1965. At left is the California Zephyr.

The fortunes of the industry in the US and Canada declined during World War I, particularly into the early 1920s. In 1919 President Woodrow Wilson created the Federal Electric Railways Commission to investigate the financial problems of the industry. The commission submitted its final report to the President in 1920. The commission's report focused on financial management problems and external economic pressures on the industry, and recommended against introducing public financing for the interurban industry. One of the commission's consultants, however, published an independent report stating that private ownership of electric railways had been a failure, and only public ownership would keep the interurbans in business.

Many interurbans had been hastily constructed without realistic projections of income and expenses. They were initially financed by issuing stock and selling bonds. The sale of these financial instruments was often local with salesmen going door to door aggressively pushing this new and exciting "it can't fail" form of transportation. But many of those interurbans did fail, and often quickly. They had poor cash flow from the outset and struggled to raise essential further capital. Interurbans were very vulnerable to acts of nature damaging track and bridges, particularly in the Midwestern United States where flooding was common. Receivership was a common fate when the interurban company could not pay its payroll and other debts, so state courts took over and allowed continued operation while suspending the company's obligation to pay interest on its bonds. In addition, the interurban honeymoon period with the municipalities of 1895–1910 was over.

The large and heavy interurbans, some weighing as much as 65 tons, caused damage to city streets which led to endless disputes over who should bear the repair costs. The rise of private automobile traffic in the middle 1920s aggravated such trends. As the interurban companies struggled financially, they faced rising competition from cars and trucks on newly paved streets and highways, while municipalities sought to alleviate traffic congestion by removing interurbans from city streets. Some companies exited the passenger business altogether to focus on freight, while others sought to buttress their finances by selling surplus electricity in local communities. Several interurbans that attempted to exit the rail business altogether ran afoul of state commissions which required that trains remain running "for the public good", even at a loss.

Many financially weak interurbans did not survive the prosperous 1920s, and most others went bankrupt during the Great Depression. A few struggling lines tried combining to form much larger systems in an attempt to gain operating efficiency and a broader customer base. This occurred in Ohio in year 1930 with the long Cincinnati & Lake Erie Railroad (C&LE), and in Indiana with the very widespread Indiana Railroad. Both had limited success up to 1937–1938 and primarily earned growing revenues from freight rather than passengers. The 130-mile (210 km) long Sacramento Northern Railway stopped carrying passengers in 1940 but continued hauling freight into the 1960s by using heavy electric locomotives.

Oliver Jensen, author of American Heritage History of Railroads in America, commented that "...the automobile doomed the interurban whose private, tax-paying tracks could never compete with the highways that a generous government provided for the motorist." William D. Middleton, in the opening of his 1961 book The Interurban Era, wrote:

"Evolved from the urban streetcar, the Interurban appeared shortly before the dawn of the 20th century, grew to a vast network of over 18,000 miles in two decades of excellent growth, and then all but vanished after barely three decades of usefulness."

Interurban business increased during World War II due to fuel oil rationing and large wartime employment. When the war ended in 1945, riders went back to their automobiles and most of these lines were finally abandoned. Several systems struggled into the 1950s, including the Baltimore and Annapolis Railroad (passenger service ended 1950), Lehigh Valley Transit Company (1951), West Penn Railways (1952), and the Illinois Terminal Railroad (1958). The West Penn was the largest interurban to operate in the east at 339 miles (546 km) and had provided Pittsburgh-area coal country towns with hourly transportation since 1888.

By the 1960s only five remaining interurban lines served commuters in three major metropolitan areas: the North Shore Line and the South Shore Line in Chicago, the Philadelphia Suburban Transportation Company, the New York, Susquehanna and Western Railway in northern New Jersey, and the Long Beach Line in Long Beach and Los Angeles, California (this was the last remaining part of the Pacific Electric system). The Long Beach Line was cut in 1961, the North Shore Line in 1963; the Philadelphia Suburban's route 103 and the NYS&W in New Jersey both ended passenger service in 1966. Today, only the South Shore Line, Norristown High Speed Line (SEPTA Route 100), and SEPTA Routes 101/102 remain.

Some former interurban lines retained freight service for up to several decades after the discontinuance of passenger service. Most were converted to diesel operation, although the Sacramento Northern Railway retained electric freight until 1965.

==== Consolidation in Europe ====
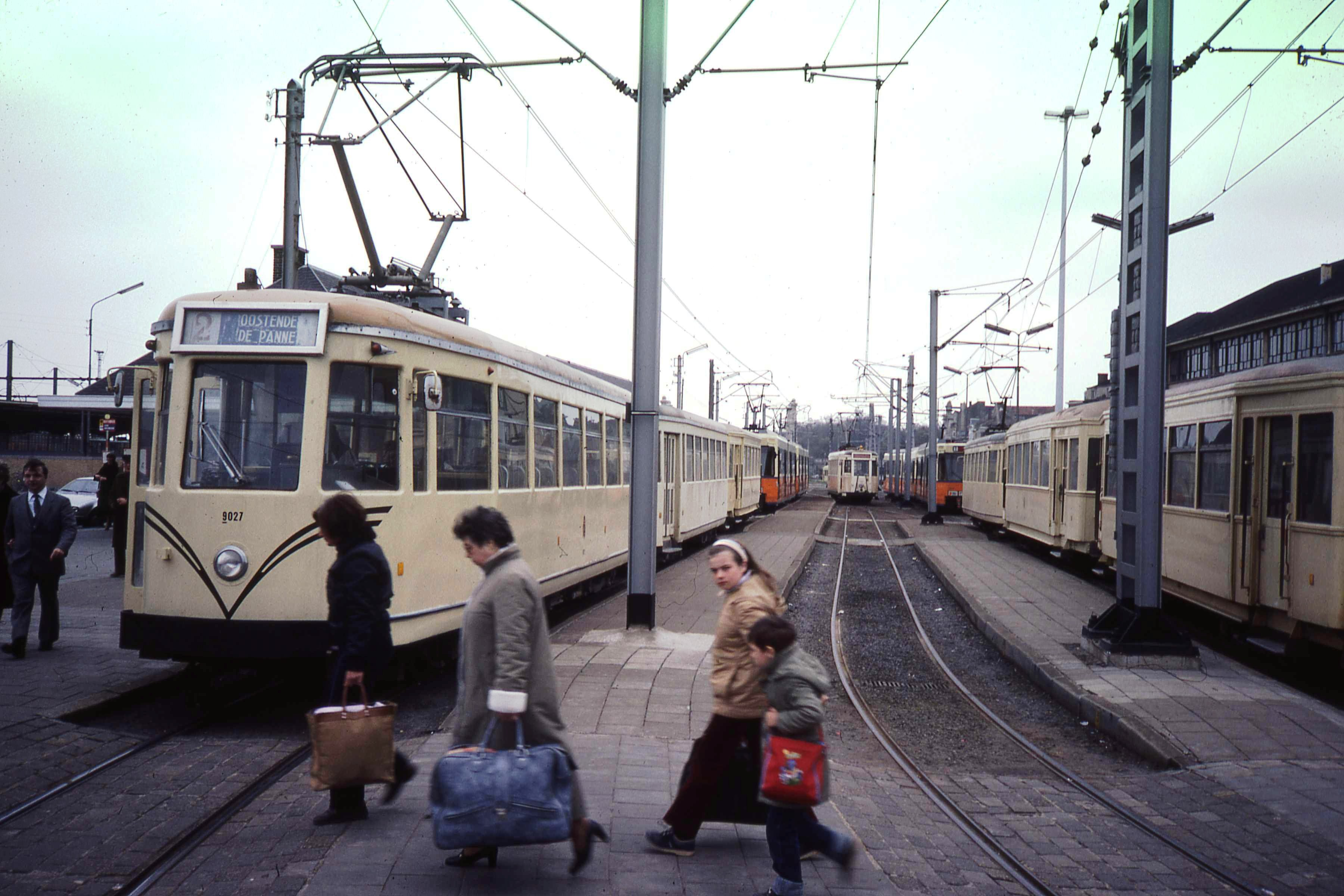
NMVB trams at Oostende in 1982, on the surviving Belgian Coast Tram line. A more recent photo can be seen at top.

After World War II, many interurbans in other countries were also cut back. In Belgium, as intercity transport shifted to cars and buses; the large sections of the vicinal tramways were gradually shut down by the 1980s. At their peak in 1945, the mileage of vicinal tramways reached 4,811 kilometres (2,989 mi) and exceeded the length of the national railway network.

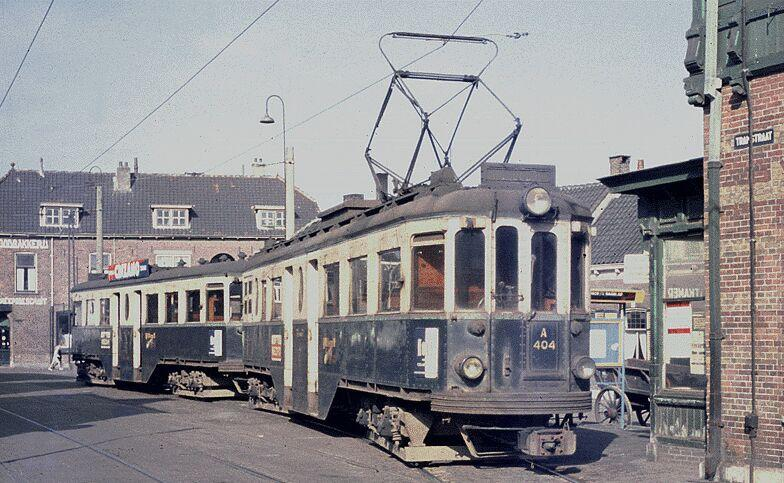
A NZH 'Blue Tram' at Katwijk

Sprawling tram networks in the Netherlands extended to neighbouring cities. The vast majority of these lines were not electrified and operated with steam and sometimes petrol or diesel tramcars. Many did not survive the 1920s and 30s for the same reasons American interurbans went ended, but those that did were put back into service during the war years on the parts not yet demolished. One of the largest systems, nicknamed the Blue Tram, was run by the Noord-Zuid-Hollandsche Stoomtramweg-Maatschappij and survived until 1961. Another, the RTM (Rotterdamse Tramweg Maatschappij), which ran in the river delta south-west of Rotterdam, survived until early January 1966. Its demise sparked the rail-related heritage movement in the Netherlands in earnest with the founding of the Tramweg Stichting (Tramway Foundation). Many systems, such as the Hague tramway and the Rotterdam tramway, included long interurban extensions which were operated with larger, higher-speed cars. In close parallel to North America, many systems were abandoned starting in the 1950s after tram companies switched to buses.

Instigated by the oil crisis in the 1970s, the remaining interurban tramways have enjoyed somewhat of a renaissance in the form of the Sneltram, a modern light rail system that uses high floor, metro-style vehicles and could interoperate into metro networks. Various other interurbans in Europe were folded into local municipal tramway or light rail systems. Switzerland retained many of its interurban lines which now operate as tramways, local railways, S-Bahn, or tram-trains. Milan's vast interurban network was progressively closed in the 1970s but parts of it were reused as the outer parts of the Milan Metro.

==== Evolution in Japan ====
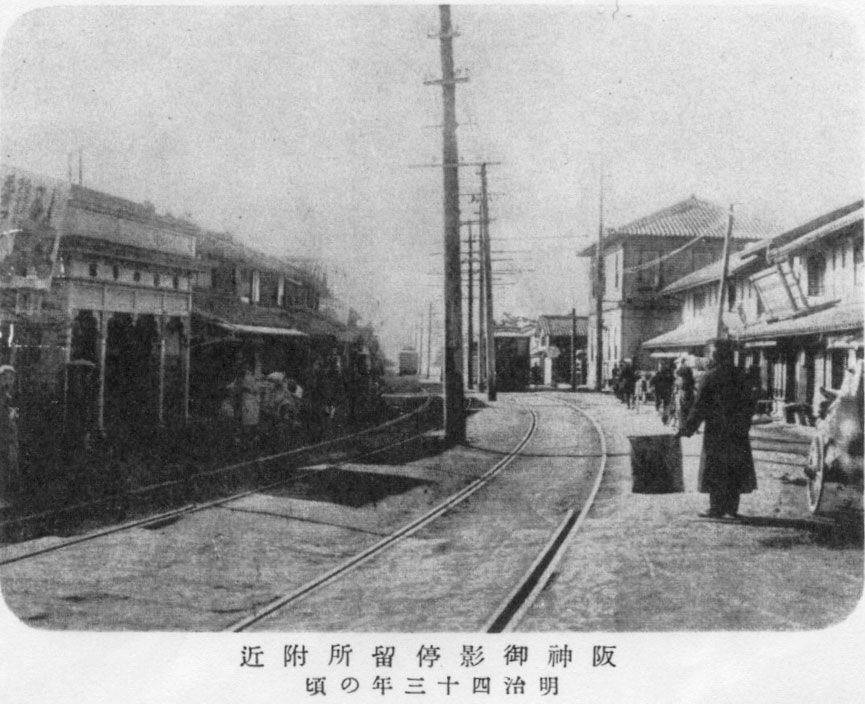
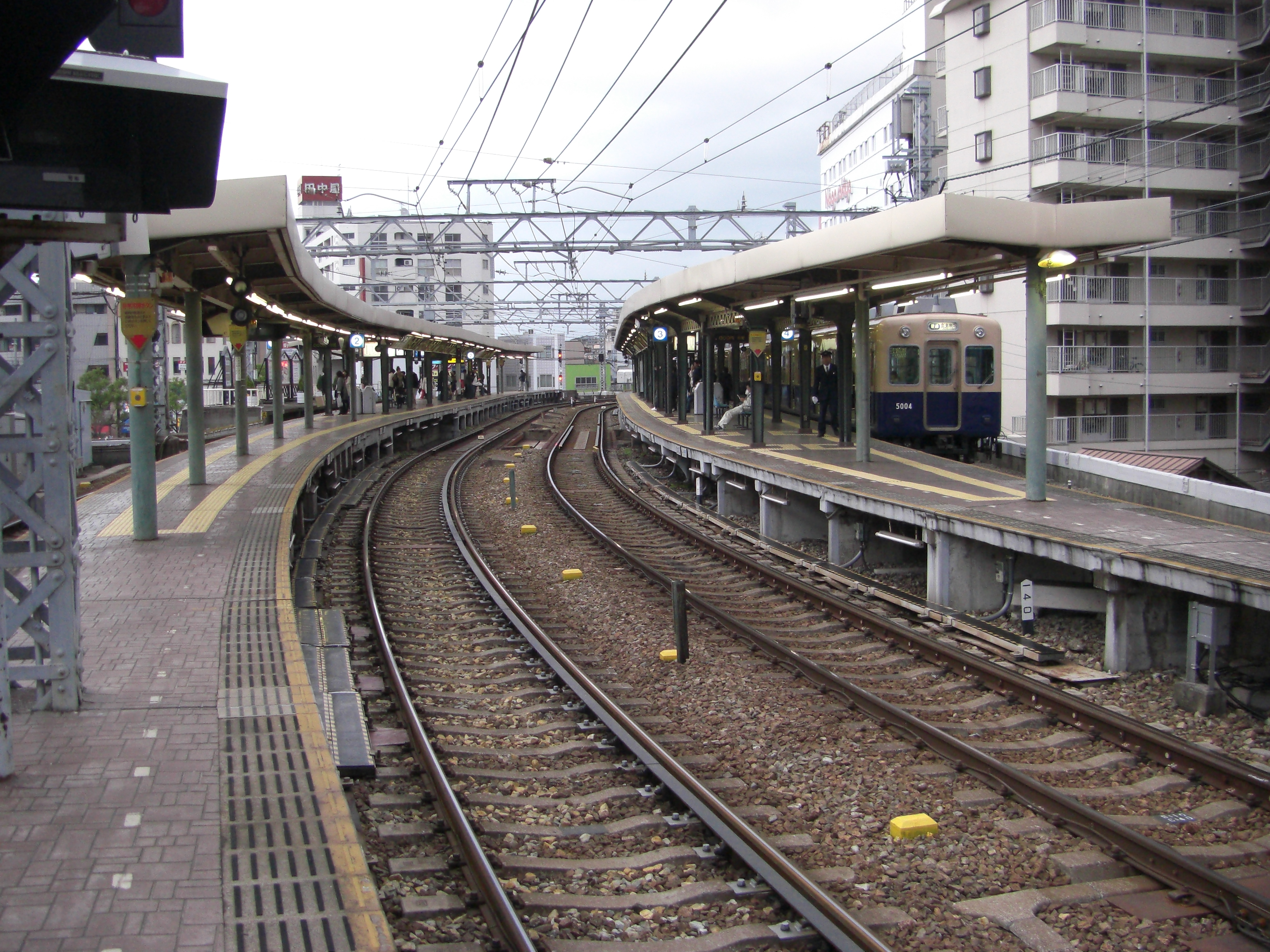
Mikage Station in 1910 (above) and 2008 (below). Note the longer platforms and grade separation, which were constructed in 1929. These improvements were typical evolutions of early interurbans in Japan.

Development of Japanese interurbans strayed from their American counterparts from the 1920s. The second boom of interurbans occurred as late as the 1920s and 1930s in Japan, with predecessors of the extensive Kintetsu Railway, Hankyu, Nankai Electric Railway and Odakyu Electric Railway networks starting life during this period. These interurbans, built with straighter tracks, electrified at 1500V and operated using larger cars, were built to even higher standards than the Japanese National Railways network at the time. The (former JNR) Hanwa Line was a wartime acquisition from Nankai, operating 'Super Express' trains on the line at an average speed of 81.6 kilometres per hour (50.7 mph), a national record at the time. The old Sendai station terminus of the Miyagi Electric Railway (the predecessor of the JR Senseki Line) was situated in a short single-track underground tunnel built in 1925; this was the first stretch of underground railway in all of Asia, predating the Tokyo Metro Ginza Line by two years. Meanwhile, existing interurbans like the Hanshin Electric Railway started to rebuild their street-running lines into grade-separated exclusive rights-of-way.

After the war, interurbans and other private railway companies received large investments and were allowed to compete not only with mainline trains but also with each other, in order to rejuvenate the country's railway infrastructure and cater to the post-war baby boom. The companies continued their policies of improvement they had followed before the war; lines were reconstructed to allow higher speeds, mainline-sized trains were adopted, street-running sections were rebuilt to elevated or underground rights-of-way, and link lines to growing metro systems were built to allow for through operations. Many of these private railway companies started to adopt standards for full-blown heavy rail lines similar to the national rail network, and, like JR commuter routes, are operated as 'metro-style' commuter railways with mainline-sized vehicles and metro-like frequencies of very few minutes. In 1957, the Odakyu Electric Railway introduced the Odakyu 3000 series SE, the first in a line of luxurious tourist Limited Express trains named 'Romancecars'. These units set a narrow-gauge speed record of 145 kilometres per hour (90 mph) on its runs to the mountain spa resort of Hakone.

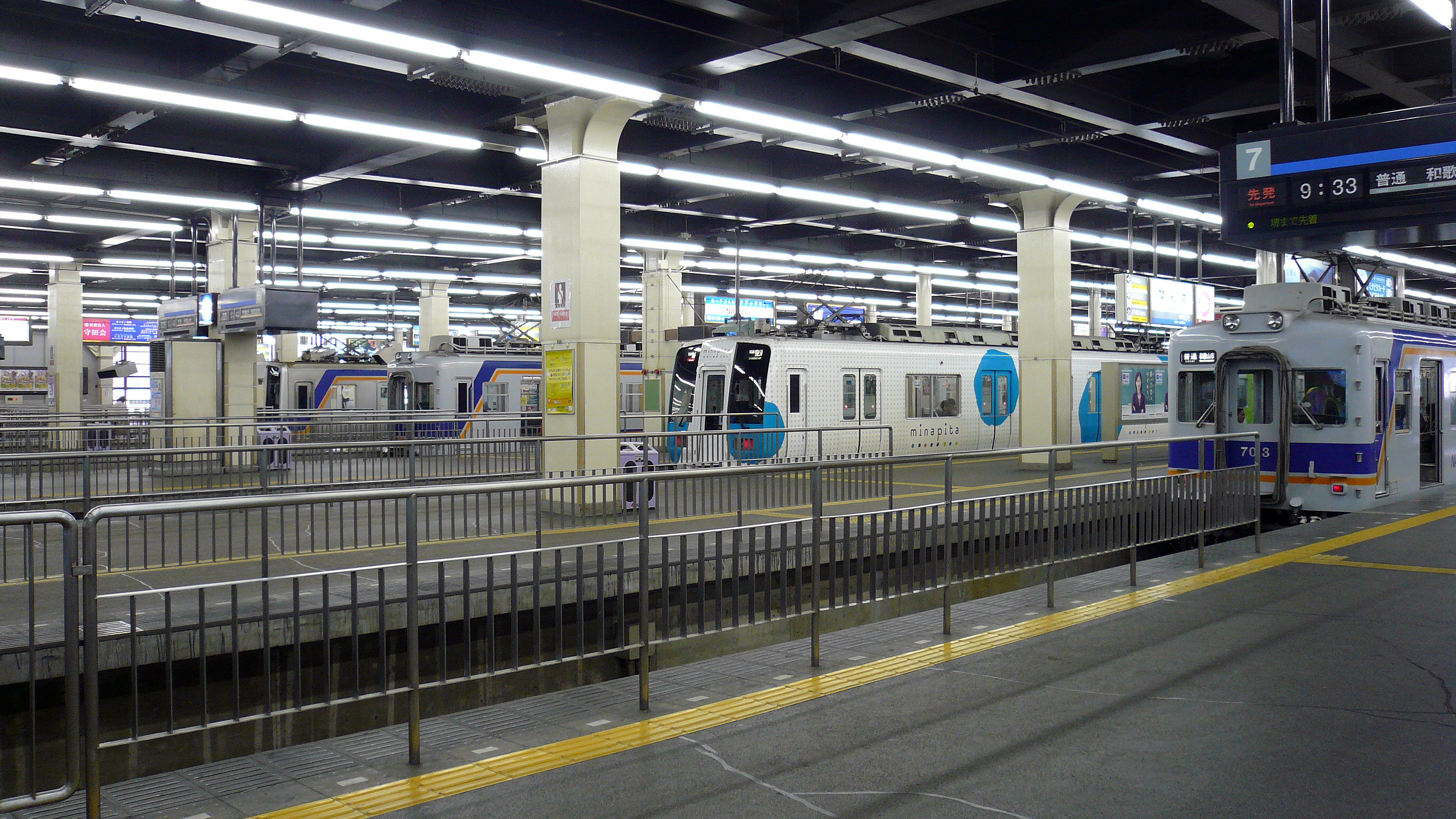
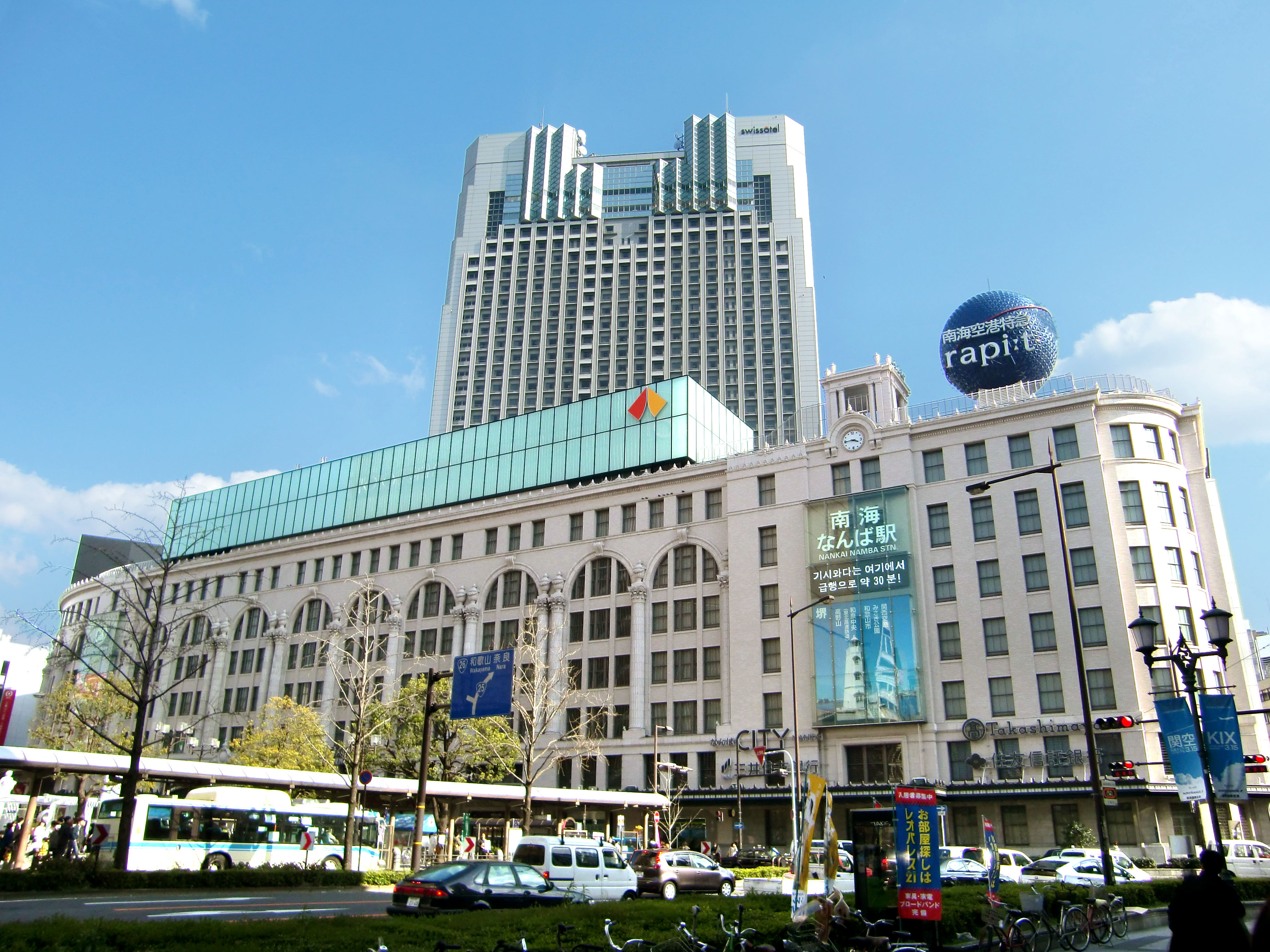
Nankai Electric Railway Namba Station. Many Japanese private railways have large urban terminals connected to their department store and office developments.

Many private lines were nationalised during the Second World War. The handful that remained in the hands of JNR after the end of the war – including the Hanwa Line, Senseki Line and the Iida Line – remain outliers on the national JR network, with short station distances, (in the case of the Iida Line) lower-grade infrastructure, and independent termini (such as Aobadori Station and the upper level of Tennōji Station).

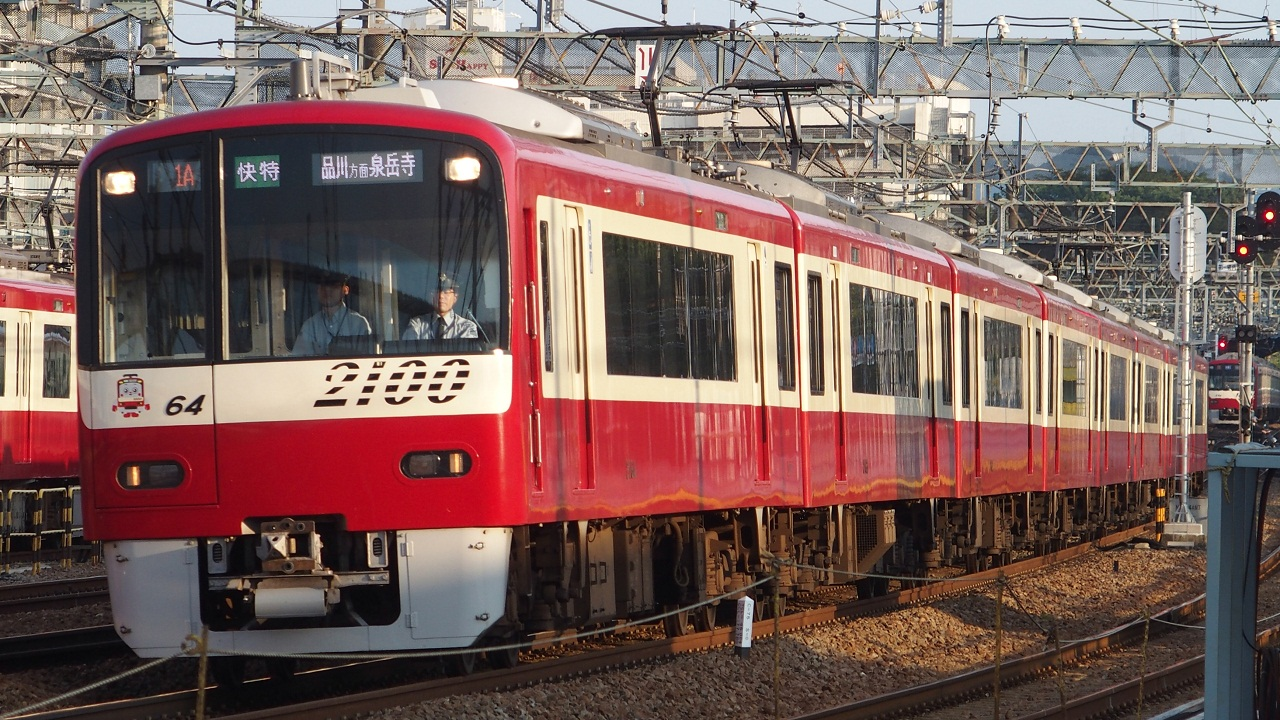
Keikyu Limited Express trains feature a livery based on the Pacific Electric.

Today, trackage of the major sixteen private railways, in many places originally designed as American-style interurban railways, has been upgraded beyond recognition into high capacity urban heavy railways. Private railway companies that started out as interurbans such as Tokyu, Seibu, Odakyu, Hankyu, and Tobu; rail transportation now tends to form only a small part of their extensive business empires, which often include real estate, hotels and resorts, and tourist attractions. For example, the Keikyu network has changed unrecognizably from its early days, operating Limited Express services at up to 120 kilometres per hour (75 mph) to compete with JR trains, and inter-operating with subway and Keisei Electric Railway trains on through runs extending up to 200 kilometres (120 mi); the trains retain a red livery based on the Pacific Electric's 'Red Cars', true to the company's interurban roots. The Keiō Line did not fully remove the street running section on the Kōshū Kaidō outside of Shinjuku Station until the 1960s, replacing it with an underground section.

Similar to passenger railway conditions in early 1900s America, intense competition still exists today between private railways and mainline railways operated by the Japan Railways Group along highly congested corridors is a hallmark of suburban railway operations in Japan. For example, on the Osaka to Kobe corridor, JR West competes intensely with both Hankyu Kobe Line and Hanshin Main Line trains in terms of speed, convenience and comfort.

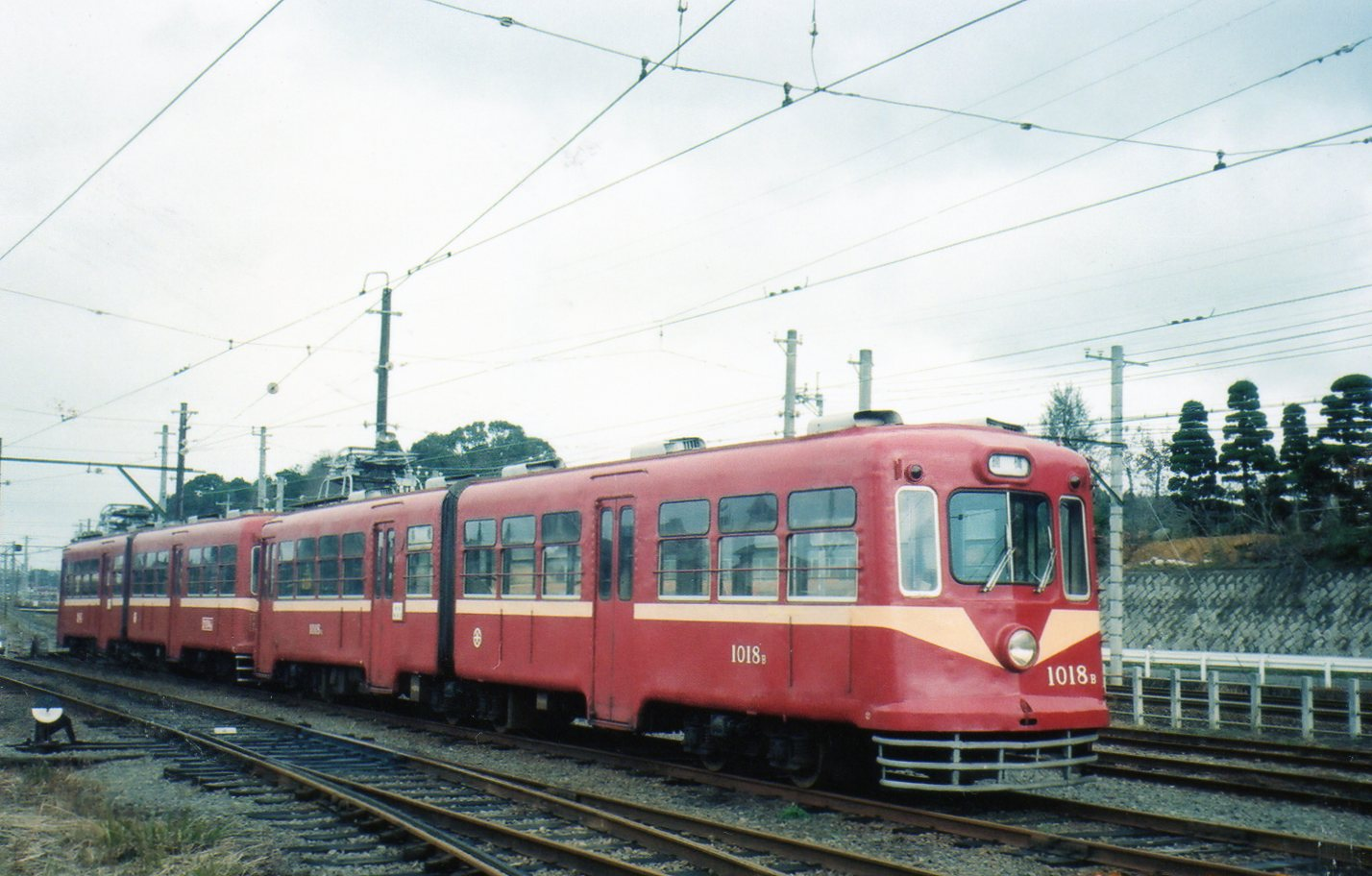
1000 Series on the Nishitetsu Kitakyushu Line before closing in 2000

However, a number of urban lines in Japan did close as late as the 2000s, with networks in Kitakyushu and Gifu being shut down.

== List of interurban systems ==
=== Austria ===
The Badner Bahn operates a classic interurban passenger service between Vienna and Baden bei Wien, in addition to some freight services. Some interurban lines survive today as local railways in Upper Austria such as the Linzer Lokalbahn, Lokalbahn Vöcklamarkt–Attersee, and Lokalbahn Lambach–Vorchdorf-Eggenberg. The Stubaitalbahn and Traunseebahn, originally built as conventional narrow-gauge railways, were converted to interurban operation more recently when they were connected to adjacent city tram systems.

=== Belgium ===
Two surviving interurban networks descending from the vicinal tramways exist in Belgium. The famous Belgian Coast Tram, built in 1885, traverses the entire Belgian coastline and, at a length of 68 kilometres (42 mi), is the longest tram line in the world. The Charleroi Metro is a never fully completed pre-metro network upgraded and developed from the dense vicinal tramway network around the city.

=== Canada ===
Similar to the United States, in Canada most passenger interurbans were removed by the 1950s. One example of continuous passenger service still exists today, the Toronto Transit Commission 501 Queen streetcar line. The western segment of the 501 Streetcar operates largely on what was the T&YRR Port Credit Radial Line, a radial line that remains intact through Etobicoke and up to the border of the neighbouring City of Mississauga, unlike other Toronto radial lines which were all abandoned outside of the 1960s boundary of the City of Toronto. In Vancouver, portions of the British Columbia Electric Railway right of way, closed in 1955, were repurposed for the Expo Line, an automated rapid transit line which opened in 1985.

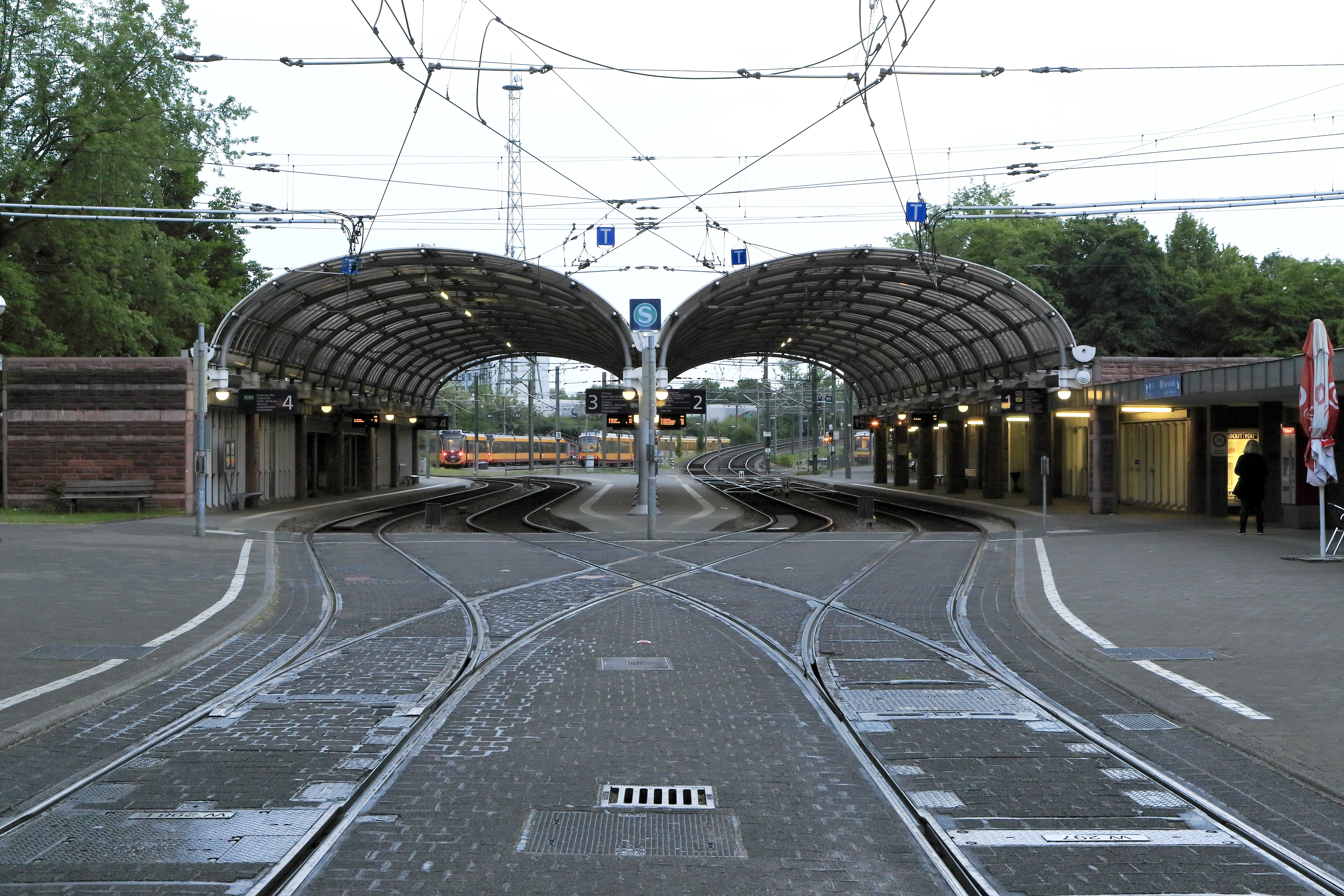
Albtalbahnhof in Karlsruhe, where the transition between railway running and street running sections of some lines in the Karlsruhe Stadtbahn is located

=== Germany ===
In Germany various networks have continued to operate. Karlsruhe revitalized the interurban concept into the Karlsruhe model by renovating two local railways Alb Valley Railway, which already had interoperability with local tram trackage, and the Hardt Railway. Other examples include:

- Interurban tram routes serving Mannheim, Heidelberg, Weinheim (Route 5), and Bad Dürkheim (Route 4) as part of the Mannheim/Ludwigshafen Tram System.
- Various interurbans upgraded as part of the Rhine-Ruhr Stadtbahn system such as Düsseldorf to Krefeld (U76), and Duisburg (U79), Bochum/Gelsenkirchen (Route 302), Mülheim to Essen, and Essen to Gelsenkirchen (Route 107).
- interurban route between Cologne to Bonn (Route 16)
- interurban route between Dresden, Radebeul, Coswig, and Weinböhla (Route 4) as part of the Dresden Tram System

=== Italy ===
Milan operates one remaining interurban tramway to Limbiate with another interurban route to Carate Brianza/Giussano, suspended since 2011. These two lines were once part of large network of interurbans surrounding Milan that were gradually closed in the 1970s. As of February 2025, the line to Carate has been being rebuilt, mostly along the original alignment, up to Seregno railway station. The line to Limbiate has benn closed since 2022, with similar plans of rebuilding it up to more modern standards.

=== Japan ===
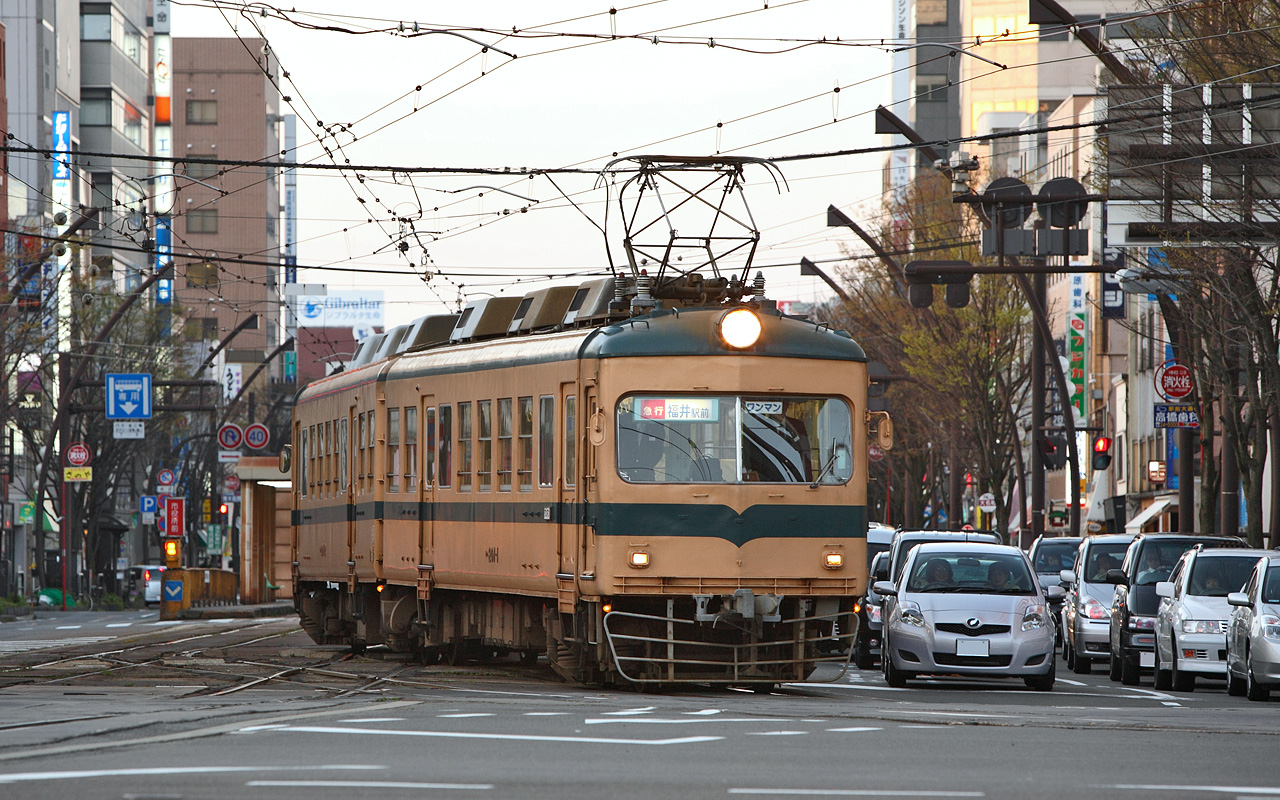
Fukui Railway 200 Series train operating on a street running section

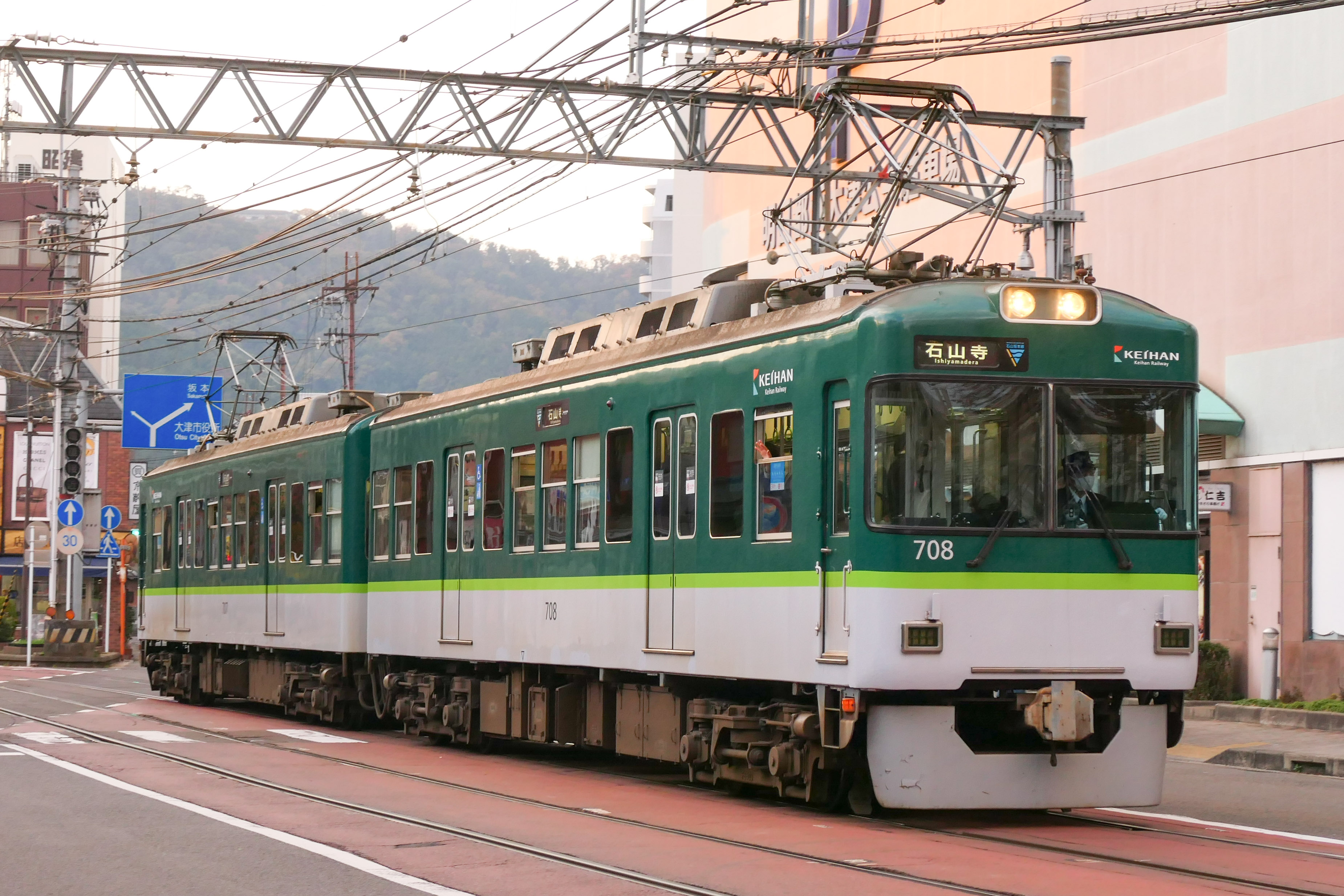
Keihan 700 Series streetrunning on the Ishiyama Sakamoto Line

In Japan, the vast majority of the major sixteen private railways have roots as interurban electric railway lines that were inspired by the US. But instead of demolishing their trackage in the 1930s, many Japanese interurbans companies upgraded their networks to heavy rail standards, becoming today's large private railways. To this day, private railway companies in Japan operate as highly influential business empires with diverse business interests, encompassing department stores, property developments, and even tourist resorts. Many Japanese private railway companies compete with each other for passengers, operate department stores at their city termini, develop suburban properties adjacent to stations they own, and run special tourist attractions with admission included in package deals with rail tickets, similar to operations of large interurban companies in the US during their heyday.

While most interurbans in Japan have been upgraded beyond recognition to high-capacity urban railways, a handful have remained relatively untouched, with street running and using 'lighter-rail' stock. They retain a distinct character similar to classic American interurbans.

These include:

- The Keihan Keishin Line, operating between Kyoto and Otsu, with through services to the Tozai Line on the Kyoto side and street running on the Otsu side. It originally was entirely street running into Kyoto but was partly replaced by the opening of the Tozai Subway Line into which trains through operate.
- The Keihan Ishiyama Sakamoto Line a primary north south line operating in Otsu with some street running sections in the city center where it connects with the Keishin Line.
- The Eizan Electric Railway originally an interurban that through operated into the Kyoto City Tram network but was isolated after the closure of the Kyoto City Tram. It operates light, one or two car consists.
- The Enoshima Electric Railway, a 10-kilometre (6.2 mi) line with elevated and on-street trackage, and operated with light, two-car articulated trains.
- The Fukui Railway Fukubu Line, which operates a variety of express and local services using light rail cars acquired from Nagoya Railroad's defunct interurban network in Gifu, over a line with an extended on-street section.
- The Kumamoto Electric Railway, which operates ex-Tokyo subway stock on a line which includes a short on-street section.
- The Chikuhō Electric Railroad Line still operates articulated tramcars on private right-of-way, a holdover from its former inter-operation with the defunct Nishitetsu Kitakyushu street tram network.

=== Netherlands ===
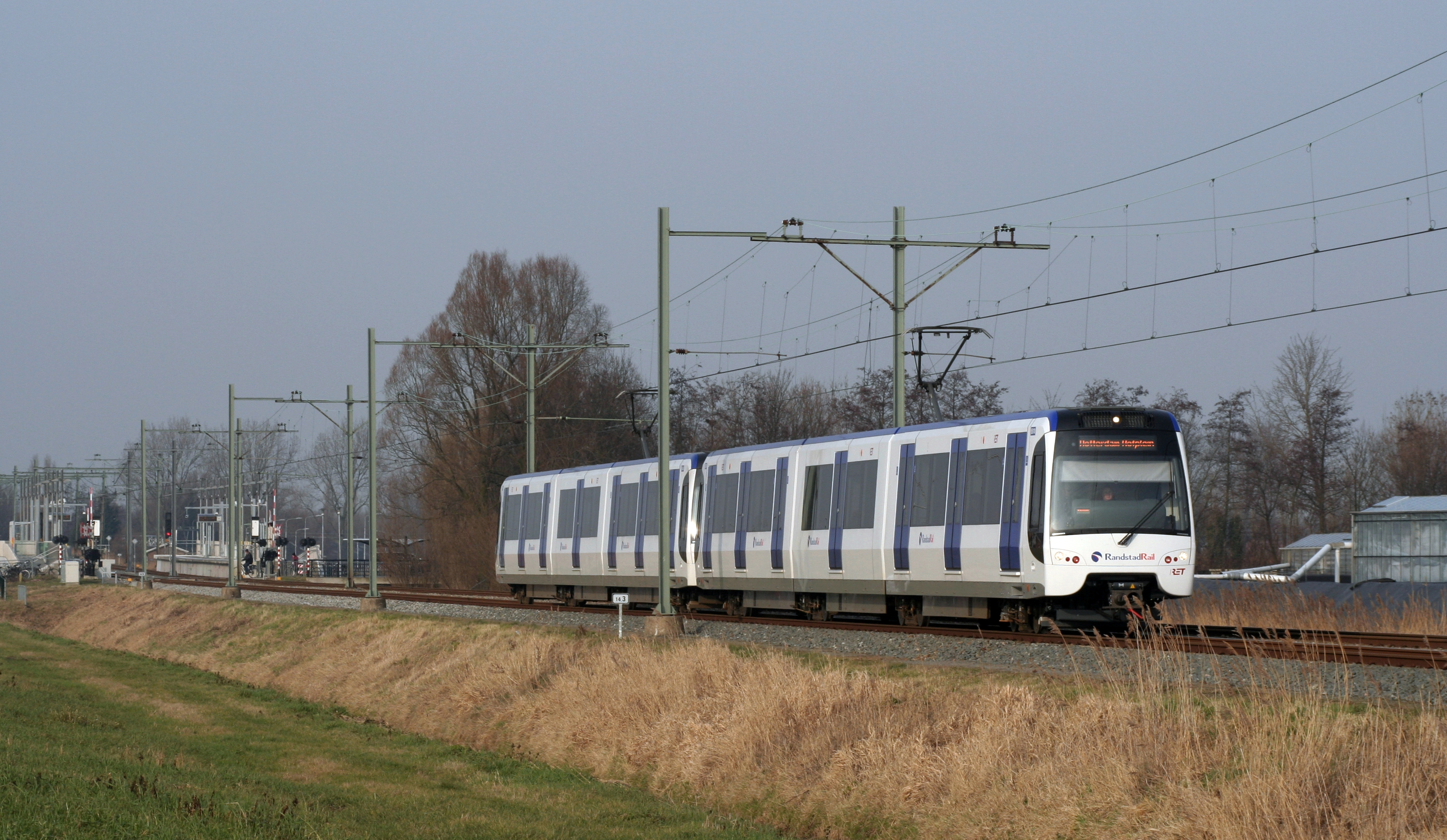
A Randstadrail Line E 'Sneltram' on the way to Rotterdam from The Hague

The only surviving interurban line is also the oldest regional tramway in the Netherlands a line from The Hague to Delft. Which opened as horse-tramway in 1866. Nowadays the line operates as Line 1 of The Hague Tramway. Line E, run by Randstadrail, was an interurban line connecting Rotterdam to The Hague and in the past also to Scheveningen. It now interoperates with the Rotterdam Metro.

=== Poland ===
A large interurban network called the Silesian Interurbans still exists today connecting the urban areas of the Upper Silesia. It is one of the largest interurban networks in Europe.

In Łódź region, an interurban tram system connects Łódź, Pabianice, Zgierz and Konstantynów Łódzki, and formerly also Ozorków, Lutomiersk, Aleksandrów Łódzki, Rzgów and Tuszyn.

=== Switzerland ===
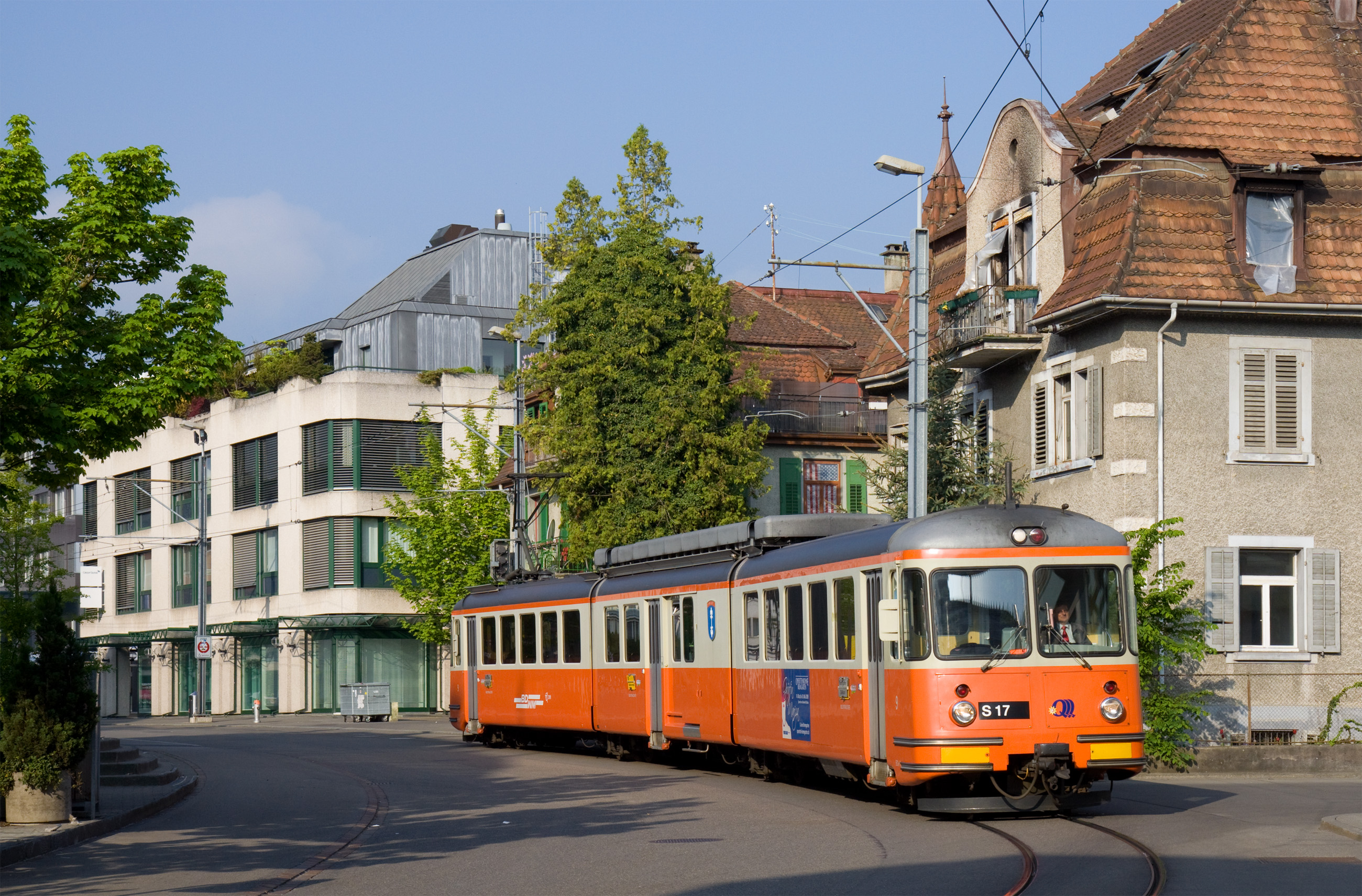
A BDe 8/8 unit streetrunning in Dietikon on the Bremgarten–Dietikon railway line

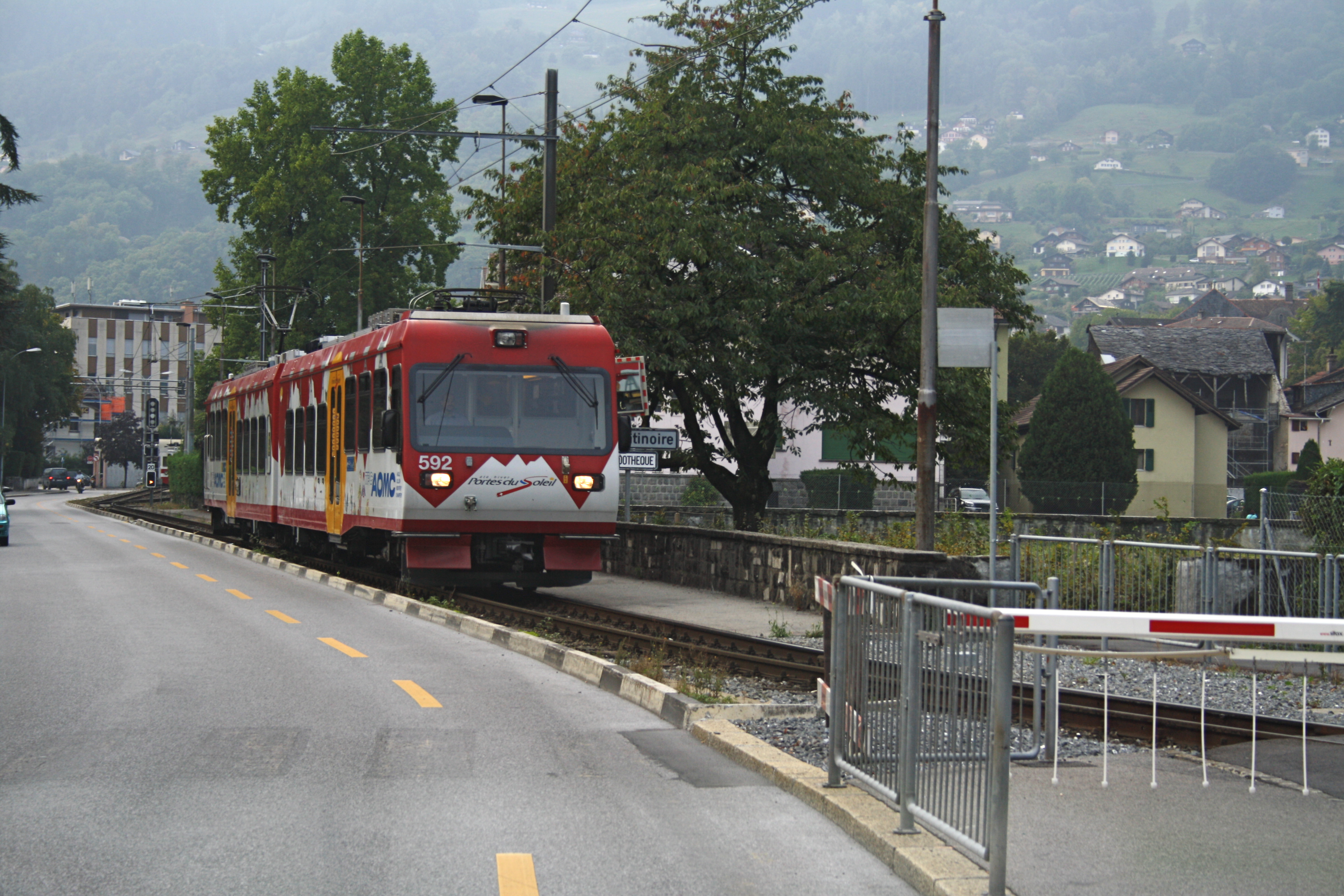
Aigle–Ollon–Monthey–Champéry railway line

Switzerland operated a huge number of interurbans, many of which have been upgraded into a number of different modes with a few remaining interurban features left. Several still have interurban characteristics such as unprotected alignments next to the road right of ways and/or street running. Today former interurban lines have been upgraded to operate as:

- Extensions of local tram system such as Bern Tramway Line 6 to Worb and Baselland Transport Line 10 formed from combining two narrow-gauge interurbans.
- Local private railway networks such as Aargau Verkehr, Aare Seeland mobil, Transports Publics du Chablais, Rhaetian Railway, and Chemins de fer du Jura or as individual railways like the Lausanne–Bercher line and Waldenburg railway. These lines commonly retain some street running sections and unprotected roadside alignments.
- Tram-trains such as the Forch railway which is part of the Zürich S-Bahn operating on the Zürich Tram System in the city center or the St. Gallen–Trogen and Frauenfeld–Wil railways as part of the St. Gallen S-Bahn.

=== United States ===
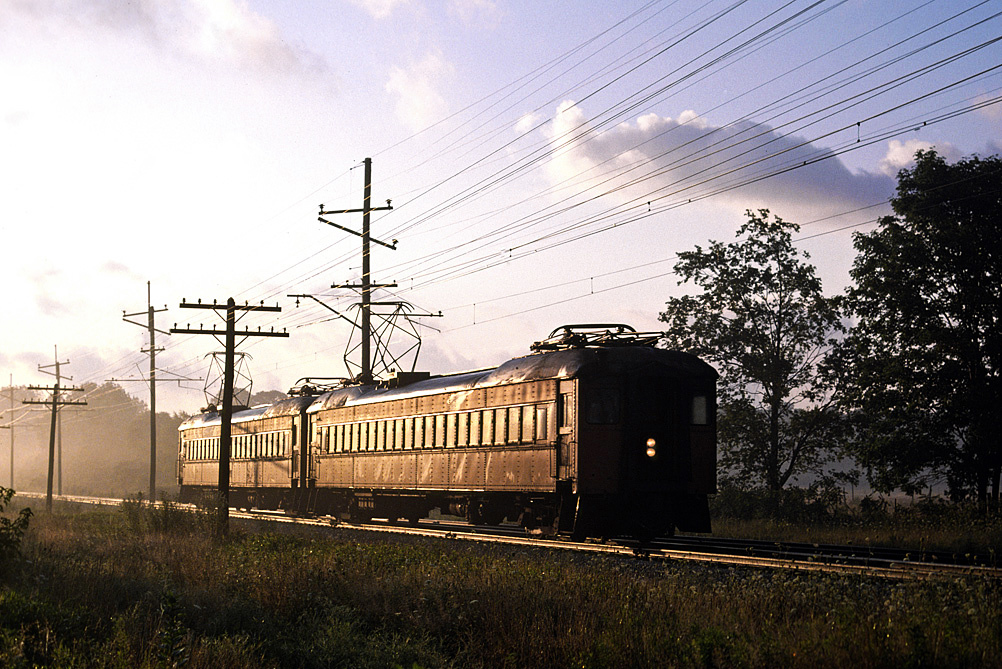
A Pullman Company electric interurban unit heading west toward Michigan City on the South Shore Line in 1980

Only three continuously operating passenger interurbans in the US remain with most having been abandoned by the 1950s.

The South Shore Line is now owned by the state of Indiana and uses mainline-sized electric multiple units. Its last section of street running, in Michigan City, Indiana, was finally closed in 2022 for conversion to a grade-separated double-track line.

SEPTA operates two former Philadelphia Suburban lines: the M as a light metro line and the D as a light rail line.

In Skokie, Illinois, the Skokie Valley portion of the North Shore Line from Dempster Street to Howard Street was acquired by the Chicago Transit Authority in 1963 and now runs as the Yellow Line. The Yellow Line initially operated with third rail from Howard Street to the Skokie Shops and switched to overhead wire for the remainder of the journey to Dempster Street, until 2004 when the overhead wire was replaced with third rail.

Several former interurban rights of way have been reused for modern light rail lines, including the A and E lines of the Los Angeles Metro Rail system, large sections of the W line, part of the Denver RTD light rail, and one section of the Baltimore Light RailLink system. Several museums and heritage railways, including the Western Railway Museum, Seashore Trolley Museum, Fox River Trolley Museum, and the Illinois Railway Museum operate restored equipment on former interurban lines. The Iowa Traction Railway still operates freight service today using interurban equipment and infrastructure. The River Line in New Jersey is also considered an interurban.

== Infrastructure and design ==
=== Right of way ===
Filmed in 1924, the opening of the Leiden – Scheveningen interurban in the Netherlands

Interurbans typically ran along or on a public right-of-way. In towns, interurbans ran in the street, sharing track with existing street railroads. While street running limited acquisition costs, it also required sharp turns and made interurban operations susceptible to traffic congestion. Unlike conventional railroads, it was rare for an interurban to construct long unencumbered stretches of private right-of-way. The torque characteristics of electric operation allowed interurbans to operate on steeper grades than conventional steam locomotives.

=== Trackage ===
Compared to conventional steam railroad trackage, interurban rail was light and ballasted lightly, if at all. Most interurbans in North America were built to standard gauge (4 ft 8 1/2 in or 1,435 mm), but there were exceptions. In Europe narrow-gauge interurbans were more common. In Japan the national mainlines were built to 3 ft 6 in (1,067 mm) narrow gauge however due to influence from for US interurban operations the first interurban companies in Japan built trackage to standard gauge. This remains the case today with Keikyu and Hanshin, forerunners of Japan's interurbans, still using standard gauge today. Later companies regauged or outright built lines to 3 ft 6 in (1,067 mm) narrow gauge for better interoperability and consistency with the Japanese mainline standards. Interurbans often used the tracks of existing street railways through city and town streets, and if these street railways were not built to standard, the interurbans had to use the non-standard gauges as well or face the expense of building their own separate trackage through urban areas. Some municipalities deliberately mandated non-standard gauges to prevent freight operations on public streets. In Pennsylvania, many interurbans were constructed using the wide "Pennsylvania trolley gauge" of 5 ft 2 1/2 in (1,588 mm). In Los Angeles, the Pacific Electric Railway, using standard 1,435 mm (4 ft 8 1/2 in) gauge track, and the Los Angeles Railway, the city's streetcar system, using 3 ft 6 in (1,067 mm) narrow gauge, shared dual-gauge track in downtown Los Angeles with one rail common to each.

=== Electrification ===
Most interurban railways in North America were constructed using the same low-voltage 500 to 600 V DC trolley power in use by the street railways to which they connected. This enabled interurban cars to use the same overhead trolley power on town street car tracks with no electrical change on the cars to accommodate a different voltage. However, higher voltages became necessary to reduce power loss on long-distance transmission lines and routes, though substations were established to boost voltage. In 1905 Westinghouse introduced a 6600 V 25 Hz alternating current (AC) system which a number of railroads adopted. This required fewer substations than DC, but came with higher maintenance costs. The necessary on-board 6600 AC voltage reduction plus AC to DC rectification on each powered car to run DC traction motors added to greater car construction expense plus the operational dangers that such on-board high voltages created.

More common were high-voltage DC systems – usually 1200 V DC, introduced in 1908 by Indianapolis & Louisville Traction Company for their Dixie Flyer and Hoosier Flyer services. In the streets, where high-speed service was not feasible, the cars ran at half speed at 600 V or got a voltage changeover device. such as on the Sacramento Northern. A 2400 V DC third-rail system was installed on the Michigan United Railways's Western Division between Kalamazoo and Grand Rapids in 1915, but was abandoned because of the electrocution potential safety hazard. Even 5000 V DC was tested.

Most interurban cars and freight locomotives collected current from an overhead trolley wire. The cars contacted this wire through the use of a trolley pole or a pantograph. Other designs collected current from a third rail. Some interurbans used both: in open country, the third rail was used and in town, a trolley pole was raised. An example of this was the Chicago, Aurora, and Elgin Railroad where a trolley pole was used in both Aurora and Elgin, Illinois. Third rail was cheaper to maintain and more conductive, but it was more expensive to construct initially and it did not eliminate the need for AC transformers, AC transmission lines, and AC/DC conversion systems. In addition, third rail posed a serious danger to trespassers and animals and was difficult to keep clear of ice.

== Trains and equipment ==
=== Rolling stock ===
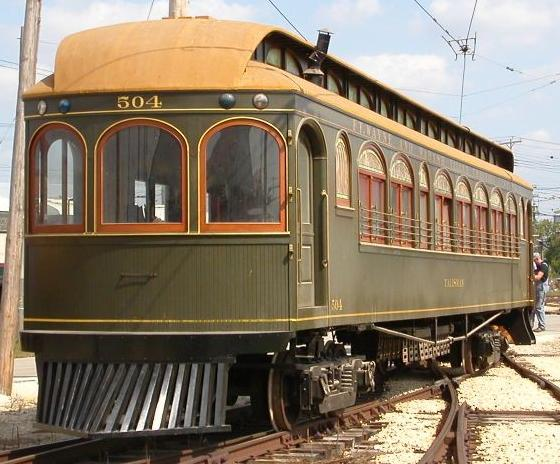
A pre-1910, all-wood heavy interurban car of the Fort Wayne and Wabash Valley Traction Company, preserved at the Illinois Railway Museum

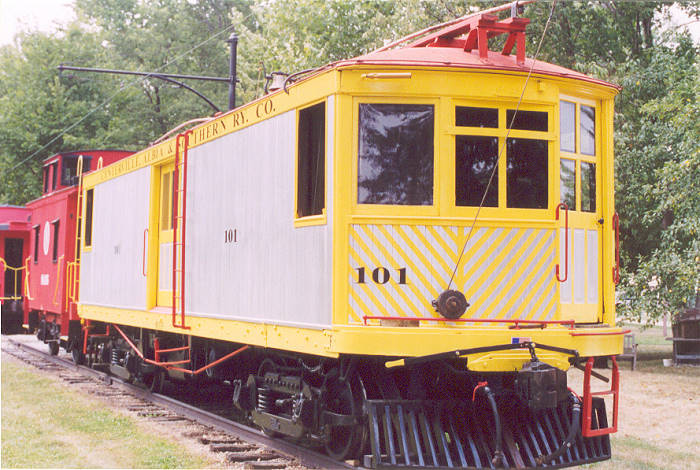
A preserved box motor from Iowa

From 1890 to 1910, roughly, American interurban cars were made of wood and often were very large, weighing up to 40 short tons (35.7 long tons; 36.3 t) and measuring as long as 60 feet (18.29 m). These featured the classic arch-window look with truss-rods and cow-catchers. Three of the best known early companies were Jewett, Niles, and Kuhlman, all of Ohio. These interurbans required a two men crew, an operator and a conductor. By 1910, most new interurban cars were constructed of steel, weighing up to 60 short tons (53.6 long tons; 54.4 t). As competition increased for passengers and costs needed to be reduced in the 1920s, interurban companies and manufacturers attempted to reduce car weight and wind resistance in order to reduce power consumption. The new designs also required only a one-man crew with the operator collecting tickets and making change. The trucks were improved to provide a better ride, acceleration, and top speed but with reduced power consumption. Into the 1930s, better quality and lighter steel and aluminum use reduced weight, and cars were redesigned to ride lower in order to reduce wind resistance. Car design peaked in the early 1930s with the light weight Cincinnati Car Company-built Red Devil cars of the Cincinnati and Lake Erie Railroad.

In addition to passenger cars, interurban companies acquired freight locomotives and line maintenance equipment. A "box motor" was a powered car exclusive for freight that looked like a passenger interurban without windows and had wide side doors for loading freight. A freight motor was geared for power rather than speed and could pull up to six freight cars depending upon the load and grades. Freight cars for interurbans tended to be smaller than those for steam railroads, and they had to have special extended couplers to prevent car corner contact at the very tight grinding turns at city street corners. Maintenance equipment included "line cars" with roof platforms for the trolley wire repair crew, snow plows and snow sweepers with rotating brushes, a car for weed control and to maintain track and ballast. In order to save money, many companies constructed these in their shops using retired or semi-wrecked passenger cars for the frame and the traction motor mounted trucks.

=== Passenger trains ===
Passenger interurban service grew out of horse-drawn rail cars operating on city streets. As these routes electrified and extended outside of towns interurbans began to compete with steam railroads for intercity traffic. Interurbans offered more frequent service than steam railroads, with headways of up to one hour or even half an hour. Interurbans also made more stops, usually 1 mile (1.6 km) apart. As interurban routes tended to be single-track this led to extensive use of passing sidings. Single interurban cars would operate with a motorman and conductor, although in later years one-man operation was common. In open country, the typical interurban proceeded at 40–45 miles per hour (64–72 km/h). In towns with the middle of the street operation, speeds were slow and dictated by local ordinance. The result was that the average speed of a scheduled trip was low, as much as under 20 miles per hour (32 km/h).

=== Freight trains ===
Many interurbans did substantial freight business. In 1926, the Cincinnati, Hamilton and Dayton Railway moved 57,000 short tons (50,893 long tons; 51,710 t) of freight per month. By 1929, this had risen to 83,000 short tons (74,107 long tons; 75,296 t) per month. During the 1920s freight revenue helped offset the loss of passenger business to automobiles. A typical interurban freight train consisted of a powered box motor pulling one to four freight cars. These often operated at night as local ordinances forbade daytime freight operation on city streets. Interurban freight in the Midwest was so extensive that Indianapolis constructed a very large freight handling warehouse which all of Indianapolis' seven interurbans companies used.

== In literature ==
In Raymond Chandler's short story The Man who liked Dogs, the narrator trails a suspect in the Los Angeles area:

Carolina Street was away off at the edge of the little beach city. The end of it ran into a disused inter-urban right of way, beyond which stretched a waste of Japanese truck farms. There were just two houses in the last block ... the rails were rusted in a forest of weeds.

Similarly in Mandarin's Jade:

The Hotel Tremaine was far out of Santa Monica, near the junk yards. An inter-urban right of way split the street in half, and just as I got to the block that would have the number I had looked up, a two-car train came racketing by at forty-five miles an hour, making almost as much noise as a transport plane taking off. I speeded up beside it and passed the block.

In E.L. Doctorow's Ragtime, a character rides on interurban systems from New York to Boston.

== Preservation ==
Numerous museums, heritage railways and societies have preserved equipment. Notable examples include:

- California State Railroad Museum
- Connecticut Trolley Museum
- East Troy Electric Railroad Museum
- Electric City Trolley Museum
- Fox River Trolley Museum
- Fraser Valley Historical Railway Society
- Halton County Radial Railway
- Illinois Railway Museum
- National Museum of Transportation
- Orange Empire Railway Museum
- Oregon Electric Railway Museum
- Pennsylvania Trolley Museum
- Rockhill Trolley Museum
- Seashore Trolley Museum
- Shelburne Falls Trolley Museum
- Shore Line Trolley Museum
- Vancouver Downtown Historic Railway
- Western Railway Museum

== See also ==
- List of interurban railways in North America
- Streetcar suburb
- Rapid transit
- Interurban Press
- Light rail, a contemporary successor to interurbans
- Tram-train, a similar concept with streetcars sharing mainline intercity tracks for interurban sections
- Elektrichka, a similar system in Russia and post-Soviet states

== Bibliography ==
- Bruce, Alfred W. (1952). The Steam Locomotive in America. New York: Bonanza Books. OCLC 1197341.
- Bradley, George K. (1991). Indiana Railroad: The Magic Interurban. Chicago: Central Electric Railfans' Association. ISBN 0-9153-4828-4. OCLC 24942447.
- Bureau of the Census (1905). Street and Electric Railways, 1902: Special Reports. Washington, D.C.: GPO. OCLC 6024669.
- Chandler, Raymond (1964). Killer in the Rain. Penguin. pp. 67–68. Originally published in Black Mask. March 1936.
- Cornolò, Giovanni (1980). Fuori porta in tram: le tranvie extraurbane milanesi, 1876-1980 (in Italian). Ermanno Albertelli Editore.
- Grant, H. Roger (Spring 1980). "Arkansas's "Paper Interurbans"". The Arkansas Historical Quarterly. 39 (1): 53–63. doi:10.2307/40023151. JSTOR 40023151.
- Grant, H. Roger (2016). Electric Interurbans and the American People. Bloomington, Indiana: Indiana University Press. ISBN 978-0-253-02272-1.
- Hilton, George W. & Due, John Fitzgerald (1960). The Electric Interurban Railways in America. Stanford, California: Stanford University Press. OCLC 237973.
- Jensen, Oliver (1993). American Heritage History of Railroads in America. New York: Bonanza Books. ISBN 9780517362365. OCLC 27976092.
- Keenan, Jack (1974). Cincinnati & Lake Erie Railroad: Ohio's Great Interurban System. San Marino, CA: Golden West Books. ISBN 0-8709-5055-X.
- Keenan, Jack (2001). "The Fight for Survival: the C&LE and the Great Depression" (PDF). Indiana Historical Society. Archived from the original (PDF) on 13 September 2012.
- Middleton, William D. (1961). The Interurban Era. Milwaukee, WI: Kalmbach Publishing. OCLC 4357897 – via Archive.org.
- Rowsome, Frank M.; Maguire, Stephen D. (1956). Trolley Car Treasury. New York: Bonanza Books. OCLC 578061777.
- Royle, Edward (2016). Modern Britain Third Edition: A Social History 1750–2011. A&C Black. ISBN 978-1-84966-570-4.
- Schwandl, Robert (2017). Tram Atlas Poland. Schwandl, Robert. ISBN 978-3-936573-50-3.
- Soida, Krzysztof (1998). Komunikacja tramwajowa w aglomeracji katowickiej : 100 lat tramwaju elektrycznego [Tram communication in the Katowice agglomeration: 100 years of electric tram] (in Polish). Katowice: Przedsiębiorstwo Komunikacji Tramwajowej. ISBN 83-85145-13-3. OCLC 750734568.
- van 't Hoogerhuijs, Herman; Moerland, Marco (2012). Tussen stad en land (in Dutch). Alkmaar: De Alk. ISBN 9 78-90-6013-334-7.
