= Trams in Krefeld =

Part of the public transport system in Krefeld, Germany

Coordinates: 51°20′01″N 06°33′57″E

Krefeld tramway network
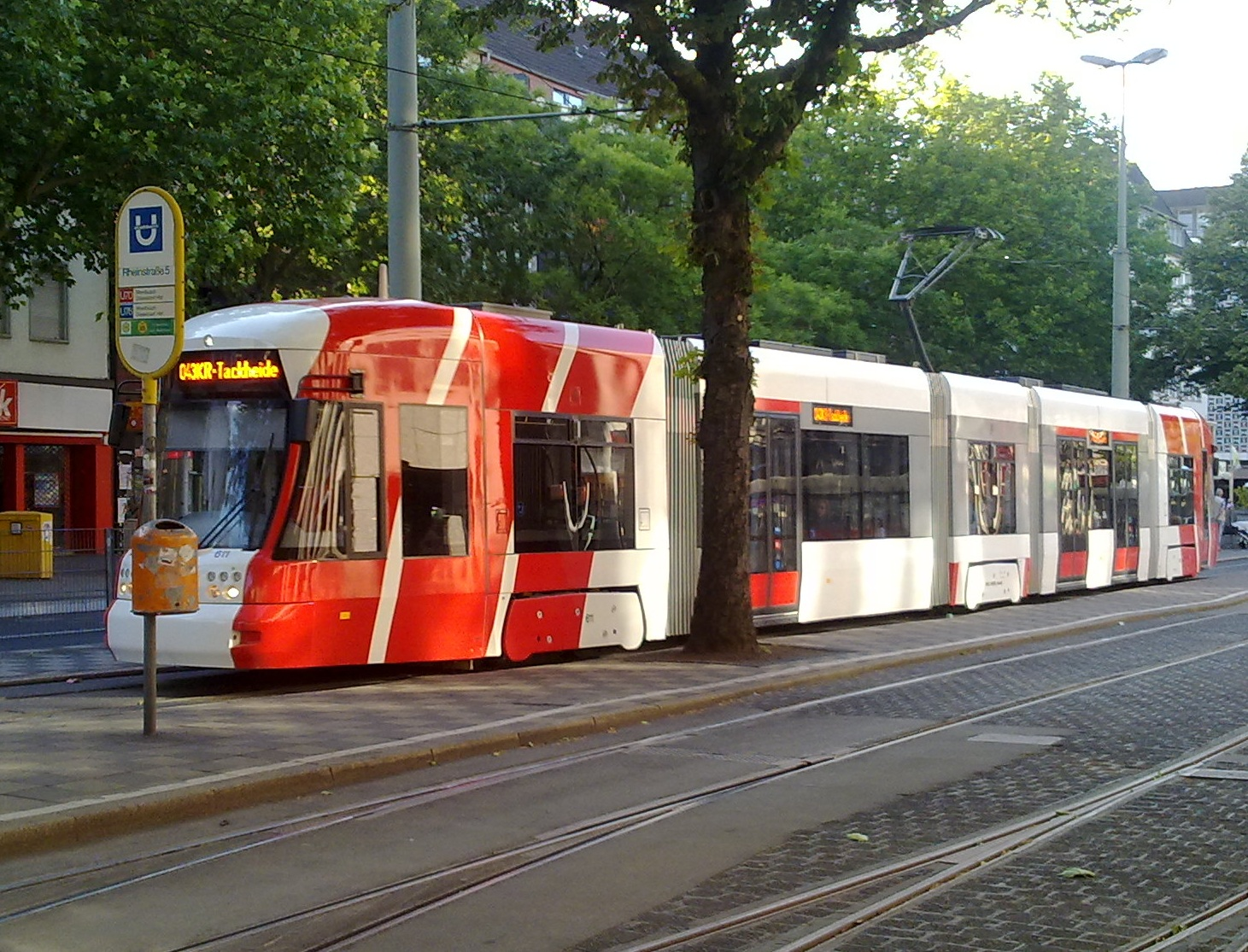
- Flexity Outlook C tram in Krefeld, 2010

Operation
- Locale: Krefeld, North Rhine-Westphalia, Germany

Statistics
Horsecar/steam tram era: 1883–1901
- Status: Superseded
- Track gauge: 1,000 mm (3 ft 3 3/8 in)
- Propulsion system: Horses/steam trams
Electric tram era: since 1900
- Status: Operational
- Lines: 4
- Operators: SWK MOBIL; (since 2002)
- Track gauge: 1,000 mm (3 ft 3 3/8 in)
- Propulsion system: Electricity
- Electrification: 750 V DC
- Route length: 36.7 km (22.8 mi)
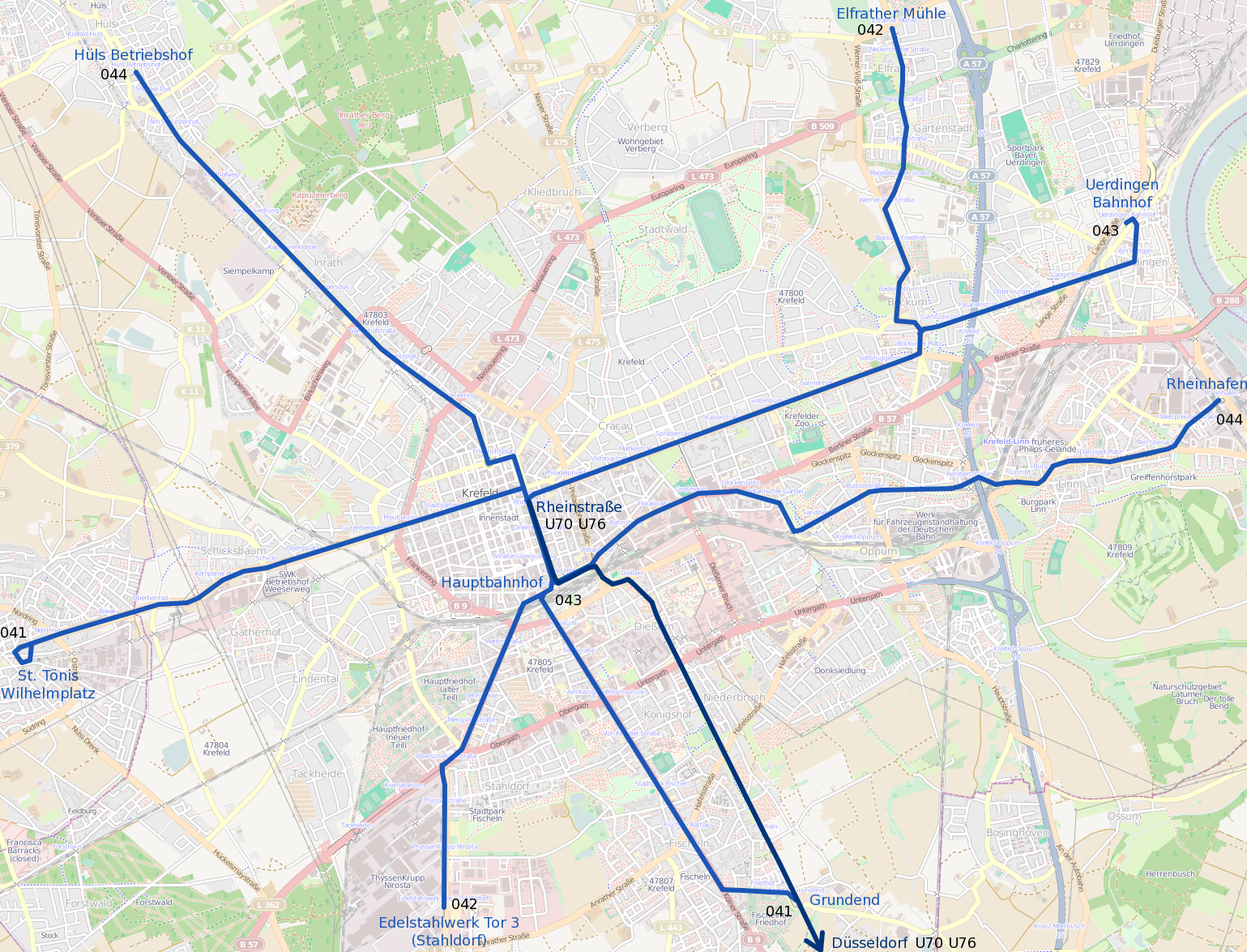
- Krefeld tramway network (as of June 2013).
- Website: http://www.swk.de/privatkunden/bus-bahn.html SWK MOBIL (in German)

The Krefeld tramway network (German: Straßenbahnnetz Krefeld) is a network of tramways forming part of the public transport system in Krefeld, a city in the federal state of North Rhine-Westphalia, Germany. Opened in 1883, the network has been operated since 2002 by SWK MOBIL, and is integrated in the Verkehrsverbund Rhein-Ruhr (VRR).

== Lines ==
As of June 2013, the Krefeld tramway network had four lines, operating in Krefeld and St.Tönis.

All of these lines, along with lines U70 and U76 of the Düsseldorf-Krefeld Stadtbahn, run through the centre of Krefeld, on a combined double track route via Ostwall, using four rails per track (two of them metre gauge, and the other two standard gauge).

Tram lines (as of June 2013)

Line	Route
041	Tönisvorst-St. Tönis – Krefeld Hbf – Königshof – Fischeln – Grundend
042	Elfrather Mühle – Gartenstadt – Bockum – Krefeld Hbf – Lehmheide – Stahldorf – Edelstahlwerk Tor 3
043	Uerdingen Bf – Bockum – Krefeld Hbf
044	Rheinhafen – Linn – Oppum – Krefeld Hbf – Inrath – Hüls

In the evenings, all tram lines run to about 24:00, and in the early hours of Saturdays and Sundays, lines 041, 042 and 044 continue running until 03:30.

Düsseldorf Stadtbahn lines (as of December 2024)

Line	Route
U70	Krefeld, Rheinstr. – KR-Hbf – KR-Grundend – Meerbusch – D-Lörick – Düsseldorf Hbf (express service)
U76	Krefeld, Rheinstr. – KR-Hbf – KR-Grundend – Meerbusch – D-Lörick – Düsseldorf Hbf – D-Oberbilk – D-Holthausen

== See also ==
- List of town tramway systems in Germany
- Trams in Germany
