= George Hilton (historian) =

American historian and economist (1925–2014)

George W. Hilton
- Born: January 18, 1925; Chicago, Illinois
- Died: August 4, 2014 (aged 89); Columbia, Maryland

Academic background
- Education: University of Chicago; London School of Economics; Dartmouth College

Academic work
- Discipline: Historian and economist
- Institutions: UCLA

George Woodman Hilton (January 18, 1925 – August 4, 2014) was a United States historian and economist, who specialized in social history, transportation economics, regulation by commission, the history of economic thought and labor history.

== Early life and education ==
Born in Chicago, Hilton attended Dartmouth College and earned his BA in Economics summa cum laude in 1946. He obtained his MA in 1950. Hilton attended the London School of Economics in 1953–1955, and obtained his PhD from the University of Chicago in 1956.

== Career ==
He then taught for many years at the University of California, Los Angeles, and was later a Professor Emeritus of Economics at UCLA. He served as the Acting Curator of Rail Transportation at the Smithsonian Institution from July 1968 through June 1969. He died of heart disease in 2014, aged 89.

== Publications ==
=== Books ===
- Hilton, G. W. (1954) Cable railways of Chicago, Electric Railway Historical Society.
- Hilton, G. W. (1960) The truck system including a history of the British truck acts 1465–1960
- Hilton, George W. & Due, John Fitzgerald (1960). The Electric Interurban Railways in America. Stanford, California: Stanford University Press. OCLC 237973.
- Hilton, George W. (2003) [1962]. The Great Lakes car ferries. Davenport, Iowa: Montevallo Historical Press. ISBN 0-9658624-3-7. OCLC 61225777.
- Hilton, G. W. (1963) The Ma and Pa: A History of the Maryland and Pennsylvania Railroad. Howell-North Books (Second edition, 1980; revised, 1999, The Johns Hopkins University Press)
- Hilton, G. W. (1964) The Staten Island Ferry, Howell-North Books, First edition.
- Hilton, G. W. (1968) The Night Boat, Howell-North Books, First edition.
- Hilton, G. W. (1969) The Transportation Act of 1958: A decade of experience, Indiana University Press, First edition.
- Hilton, G. W. (1971) The Cable Car in America (Revised edition, 1982)
- Hilton, G. W. (1974) Federal Transit Subsidies: The Urban Mass Transportation Assistance Program. (AEI)
- Hilton, G. W. (1975) The Northeast railroad problem (AEI)] Pdf.
- Hilton, G. W.; Jobe, Joseph and Plummer, Russell (1976) The illustrated history of paddle steamers Two Continents Publishing Group.
- Hilton, G. W. (1976) "What did we give wp with the big red cars?" (article)
- Hilton, George W. (1980). Amtrak: The National Railroad Passenger Corporation (PDF). Washington, DC: American Enterprise Institute for Public Policy Research. ISBN 0-8447-3369-5. OCLC 5777023.
- Hilton, G. W. (1987) Monon Route, Howell-North.
- Hilton, George W. (1997) [1990]. American narrow gauge railroads. Stanford, California: Stanford University Press. ISBN 0-8047-1731-1. OCLC 20418057.
- Hilton, G. W. (1995) The annotated baseball stories of Ring W. Lardner, 1914–1919 Stanford University Press, First edition.
- Hilton, G. W. (1995) Eastland: legacy of the Titanic Stanford University Press.
- Hilton, George Woodman (1997). The Toledo, Port Clinton and Lakeside Railway. Montevallo, Ala.: Montevallo Historical Press. ISBN 0-9658624-0-2. OCLC 37898677.
- Hilton, G. W. (1997) Nellie Farren, Sir Arthur Sullivan Society.
- Hilton, George Woodman (2002). Lake Michigan passenger steamers. Stanford, Calif.: Stanford University Press. ISBN 0-8047-4240-5. OCLC 49942913.
- Hilton, G. W. (2002) Lake Michigan passenger steamers, Stanford University Press.
- Hilton, G. W. (2002) editor, The Front Page: From Theater to Reality, Hanover: Smith and Kraus, Inc.

=== Selected chapters and journal articles ===
- Hilton, George W. (1957). "The British Truck System in the Nineteenth Century". Journal of Political Economy. 65 (3): 237–256. doi:10.1086/257922. ISSN 0022-3808. JSTOR 1833293. S2CID 146597493.
- Hilton, G. W. (April 1958). "The truck act of 1831". The Economic History Review. 10 (3): 470–479. doi:10.1111/j.1468-0289.1958.tb00020.x.
- Hilton, G. W. (1959), "The theory of tax incidence applied to the gains of labor unions", in Abramovitz, Moses; et al. (eds.), The allocation of economic resources: essays in honor of Bernard Francis Haley, Stanford, California: Stanford University Press, OCLC 490147128. ISBN 9780804705684
- Hilton, George W. (1962). "The Decline of Railroad Commutation". The Business History Review. 36 (2): 171–187. doi:10.2307/3111454. ISSN 0007-6805. JSTOR 3111454. S2CID 155828018.
- Hilton, George W. (1963). "Public Policy Toward the Extinction of the Railroads". Transportation Journal. 3 (2): 17–26. ISSN 0041-1612. JSTOR 20711898.
- Hilton, George W. (July 1969). "Transport technology and the urban pattern". Journal of Contemporary History. 4 (3): 123–135. doi:10.1177/002200946900400308. ISSN 0022-0094. S2CID 162286809.
- Hilton, George W. (1972). "The Basic Behavior of Regulatory Commissions". The American Economic Review. 62 (1/2): 47–54. ISSN 0002-8282. JSTOR 1821523.
- Hilton, George W. (1983-08-01). "The role of government in emergency transportation planning". Energy. Energy use in Transportation Contingency Planning. 8 (8–9): 581–588. Bibcode:1983Ene.....8..581H. doi:10.1016/0360-5442(83)90025-7. ISSN 0360-5442.

=== Articles and comments ===
Published in Trains Magazine, 1945–1993:

- Pere Marquette, August 1945 issue, pages 7–21
- Tennessee Central, January 1946 issue, pages 8–15
- Meets All Trains, August 1946 issue, pages 48–49
- Carquinez Train Ferries, August 1946 issue, pages 36–39
- Where 19th Century Carferries Float On, March 1965 issue, pages 24–27
- What Does Manx Mean?, September 1966 issue, pages 24–27
- What Went Wrong and What to Do About It, January 1967 issue, pages 36–45
- Muckraking in a Day Coach, June 1968 issue, pages 48–50
- The Promise of Promontory, May 1969 issue, pages 20–28
- What Was Grand About Grand Central, September 1969 issue, pages 20–28
- Ralph in the Roundhouse, November 1970 issue, pages 44–47
- Please, No Hero for the North Western, January 1971 issue, pages 27–28
- Integration in the North, July 1971 issue, pages 36–43
- The View of the Viaduct from in Front of the Diner, May 1972 issue, pages 20–25
- What Does the ICC Cost You and Me?, October 1972 issue, pages 24–28
- Turntable: Good News from the Lehigh Valley, August 1973 issue, page 58
- Department-Store Mural, March 1974 issue, page 43
- Why Pre-Electronic Railroading Survives, May 1974 issue, pages 20–24
- Turntable: Railfanning as Education, November 1974 issue, page 66
- Great Lakes Car Ferries: An Endangered Species, January 1975 issue, pages 42–51
- Turntable: The View from Middle Age, November 1975 issue, page 82
- Slack, February 1976 issue, pages 22–28
- What Does the ICC Cost You and Me? Currently, That Is, June 1978 issue, pages 28–32
- The One Best Place to Watch Trains, December 1980 issue, pages 28–38
- Turntable: Infran-canin-ophilia, March 1983 issue, page 66
- Turntable: Railfanning without Railroads, September 1984 issue, page 70
- Turntable: Is Railroading Worth a Lifetime?, February 1985 issue, page 70
- Turntable: In Praise of the Unbuilt, February 1986 issue, page 70
- Turntable: What Should Be Preserved from the ICC, November 1987 issue, page 90
- Perspectives: The Trains Were in Transition, and It Was a Fascinating Railroad Business, November 1990 issue, pages 82–83
- ABCs of Railroading: A History of Track Gauge, September 1992 issue, pages 23–24
- Regrets from Early Youth, July 1993 issue, page 76
