= Duissern station =

Railway station in Germany

Duissern
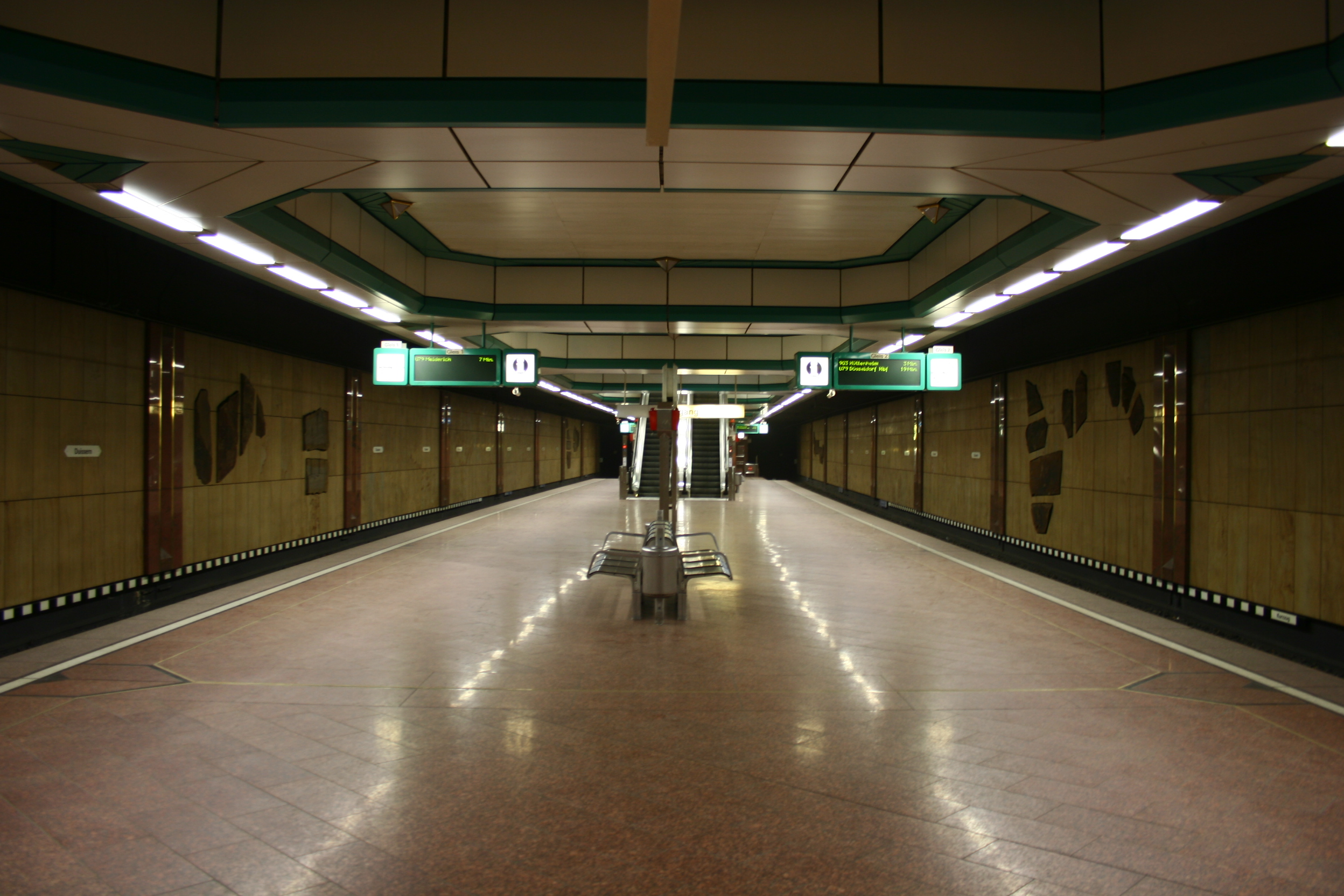
- Platform of Duissern station

General information
- Location: Duisburg; Germany
- Coordinates: 51.438973°N 6.783955°E
- System: Rhein-Ruhr Stadtbahn station
- Platforms: 1 island platform
- Tracks: 2
- Connections: Bus lines 937, 939, 944

Construction
- Structure type: Underground station
- Accessible: 1

Other information
- Fare zone: VRR: 330

History
- Opened: July 11, 1992

Services
Preceding station	Rhine-Ruhr Stadtbahn	Following station
Duisburg Hbf towards Universität Ost/Botanischer Garten	U79	Auf dem Damm towards Duisburg-Meiderich Süd
Preceding station	Straßenbahn Duisburg	Following station
Duisburg Hbf towards Mannesmann Tor II	903	Auf dem Damm towards Dinslaken
Location

Duissern is an underground light rail station in the district of Duissern, Duisburg, located under Duissernstraße, near the local employment agency. The station is served by U79 and 903 lines of Duisburg stadtbahn, which is part of Stadtbahn Rhein-Ruhr. It also offers connections to several local bus lines that stop above the station.

== History ==
Duissern is the northernmost station of the original tunnel section that was opened in 1992, and has thus been the terminus for the light rail line U79, because the wider light rail vehicles could not use the tram line to Meiderich and Dinslaken. When the tunnel to Meiderich was opened in 2000, line U79 was extended to the new end of the Tunnel, Meiderich Bahnhof.

== The station ==
The station consists of a platform and a mezzanine level. One entrance is on the south of the platform, the other in the center. The platform is divided in a high and a low part. The light rail vehicles of line U79 are high-floor trains, and thus stop at the high part. The trams of line 903 have a low-floor entrance and thus people cannot get on the train on high platforms, so this line stops at the low part.

North of the station is a siding that can be used to reverse trains, as was done with U79 trains until 2000, before there also was a branch line to the tram route via a ramp. As the tram route was replaced by the new underground line completely, the junction was removed.
