= Auf dem Damm station =

Railway station in Duisburg, Germany

Auf dem Damm
- Auf dem Damm station platforms

General information
- Location: Duisburg; Germany
- Coordinates: 51.4653504°N 6.7740258°E
- System: Rhein-Ruhr Stadtbahn station
- Platforms: 1 island platform
- Tracks: 2
- Connections: Bus lines 906, 907

Construction
- Structure type: Underground station
- Accessible: 1

Other information
- Fare zone: VRR: 230

History
- Opened: 2000

Services
Preceding station	Rhine-Ruhr Stadtbahn	Following station
Duissern towards Universität Ost/Botanischer Garten	U79	Duisburg-Meiderich Süd Terminus
Preceding station	Straßenbahn Duisburg	Following station
Duissern towards Mannesmann Tor II	903	Duisburg-Meiderich Süd towards Dinslaken
Location

Auf dem Damm is an underground Duisburg Stadtbahn station, located in Duisburg-Meiderich, named after the street "Auf dem Damm", under which it is located. The station was opened in 2000, when the overground tram route from Meiderich to Duissern was replaced by the underground section. The former route was not guided via Auf dem Damm, so before the opening of the new line, this area had no connection to the light rail network. Auf dem Damm station was designed by Eberhard Bosslet.

The station has two tracks sharing an island platform. Like most Duisburg underground stations, the platform is divided into a high part for high-floor light rail vehicles, and a low part for trams with stairs and low-floor entrances.
