= Duisburg-Hochfeld Süd station =

Railway station in Duisburg, Germany

Duisburg Hochfeld Süd
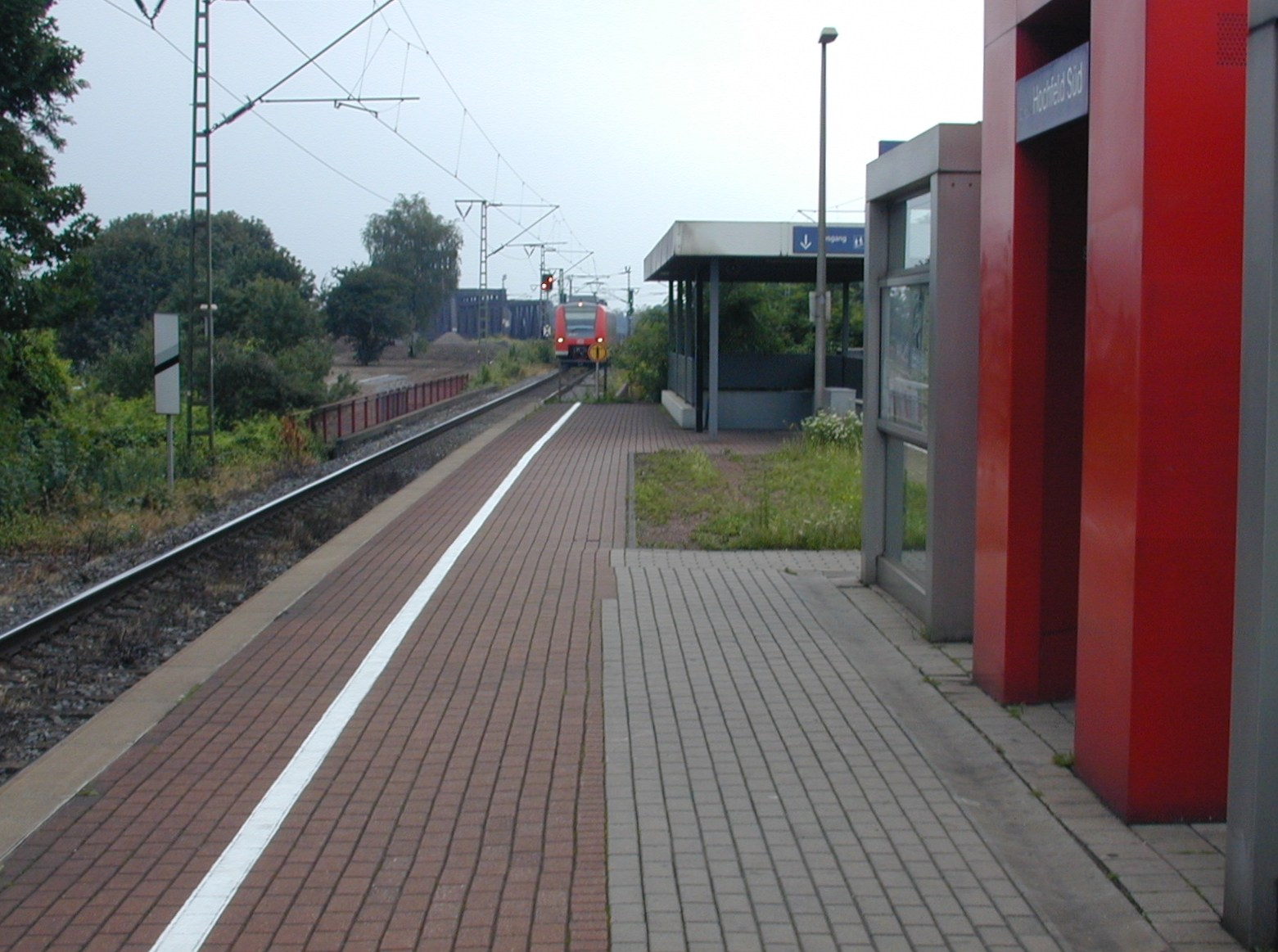
- Platform of the station looking towards Duisburg-Hochfeld Railway Bridge

General information
- Location: Lindern, NRW; Germany
- Coordinates: 51°24′32″N 6°45′11″E
- Owner: DB Netz
- Operator: DB Station&Service
- Lines: Duisburg–Mönchengladbach; Duisburg–Xanten; Osterath–Dortmund Süd (historic); Duisburg-Wedau–Bottrop Süd (freight); Troisdorf–Mülheim-Speldorf (freight)
- Platforms: 2

Construction
- Accessible: No

Other information
- Station code: 1380
- DS100 code: EDHP
- IBNR: 8001605
- Category: 5
- Fare zone: VRR: 330
- Website: www.bahnhof.de

History
- Opened: 1 September 1866

Services
Preceding station	DB Regio NRW	Following station
Rheinhausen Ost towards Aachen Hbf	RB 33	Duisburg Hbf towards Essen-Steele
Preceding station	VIAS	Following station
Rheinhausen Ost towards Mönchengladbach Hbf	RB 35	Duisburg Hbf towards Gelsenkirchen Hbf
Location
- Location within North Rhine-Westphalia

Duisburg-Hochfeld Süd station is a station with a large area of rail tracks in Duisburg in the German state of North Rhine-Westphalia. It is connected to several important railway lines. In addition, several tracks connect to Duisburg Central Station and various industrial tracks connect with the station area. It is classified by Deutsche Bahn as a category 5 station.

== History ==
On 23 August 1866, the Rhenish Railway Company (German: Rheinische Eisenbahn-Gesellschaft, RhE) put the section of the Osterath–Dortmund Süd railway from Hochfeld to Essen RhE station into operation. At the same time the train ferry from Rheinhausen was put into operation.

On 1 September 1866 the then Hochfeld (RhE) station was opened for passenger traffic.

Hochfeld became the central railway station of three important RhE lines, the Osterath–Dortmund Süd railway, the Troisdorf–Mülheim-Speldorf railway and the Duisburg–Quakenbrück railway, which also connect with numerous short routes to or from Hochfeld.

After the nationalisation of the private railway companies around 1880, the Prussian state railways built more links. Duisburg Hochfeld-Süd was also one of the starting points for to freight bypass railway to Oberhausen West.

== Current situation ==
In passenger operations, the station is served by the Regionalbahn services RB 33 (Rhein-Niers-Bahn) and RB35 (Emscher-Niederrhein-Bahn), both operating hourly.

=== Freight to the east ===
The freight line to Mülheim is closed and only the freight line to Oberhausen West freight yard and the line to Duisburg-Wedau on the Troisdorf–Mülheim-Speldorf line are still in operation.

The former rail yard with attached repair shop is already closed down and largely dismantled. However, there are considerations that the Regionalbahn service from Duisburg to Duisburg-Entenfang station (RB 37, “Der Wedauer”) might be extended via Düsseldorf-Ratingen West to Düsseldorf.

=== Freight to the north ===
The freight line to Duisburg Central Station is now only single-track. The former main freight yard at Duisburg station is almost completely dismantled and no significant freight is now handled.

The Cologne-Minden freight line that ran via Hochfeld Nord along the Boxbart route to Duisburg Central Station has been closed since 31 December 1993 and has already largely disappeared from the landscape. Cycle paths have been built on parts of the old route, but some of it was used during the development of Wörthstraße to bypass Hochfeld.

Only the line that runs on the Rhine bank to the ArcelorMittal steel works (formerly the Niederrhein works) is still in operation.

=== Freight to the south ===
The connections to Hochfeld port are largely inoperative, only the Duisburg-Hochfeld Süd–Duisburg-Wanheim line is still open, providing connection to various steel plants there (ThyssenKrupp and Mannesmann).
