= Rheinhausen Ost station =

Railway station in Duisburg, Germany

Rheinhausen Ost
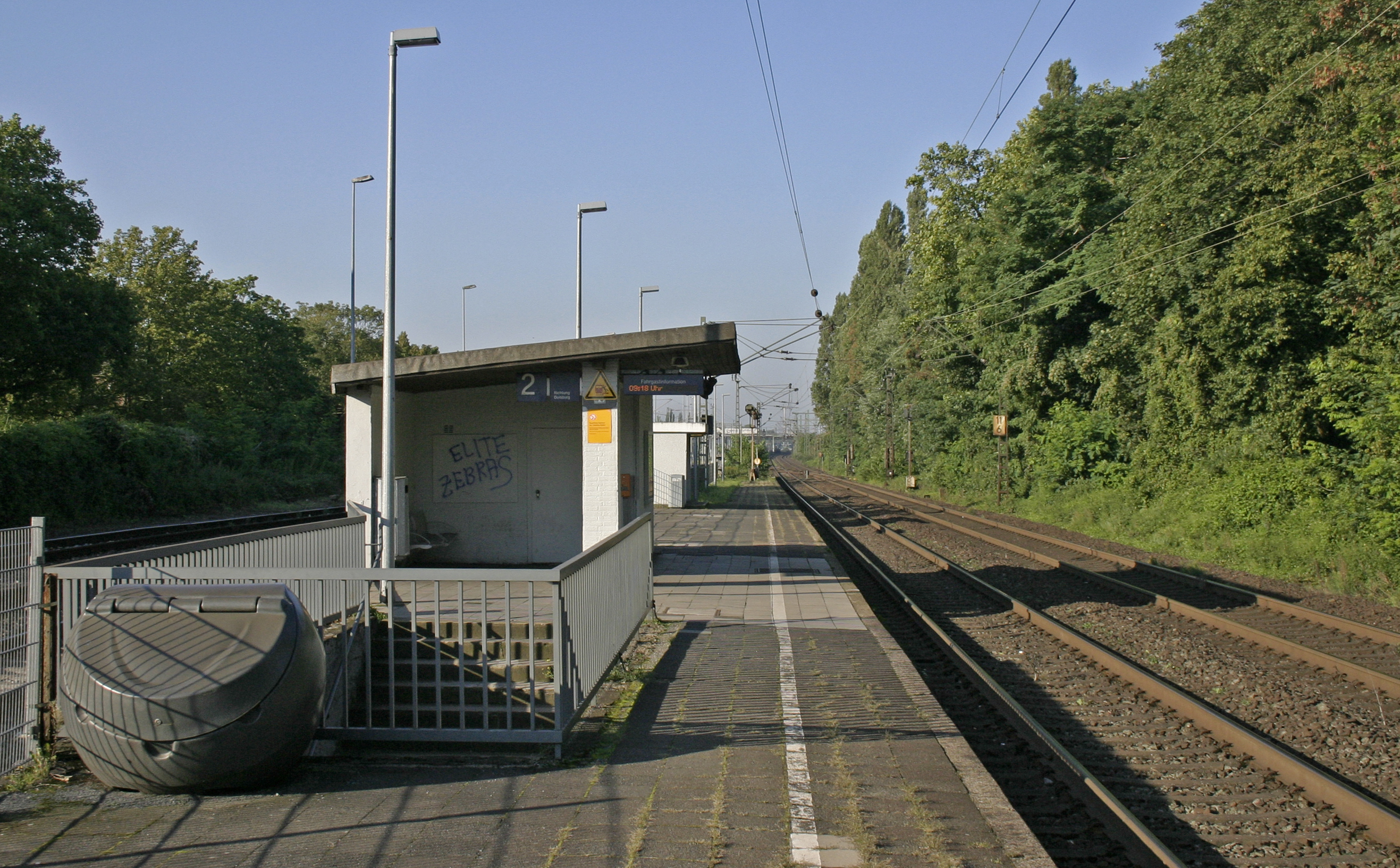
- Platform 2, 2015

General information
- Location: Friedrich-Alfredstr. 182, Rheinhausen-Mitte, Duisburg, NRW; Germany
- Coordinates: 51°24′06″N 6°43′26″E
- Owner: DB Netz
- Operator: DB Station&Service
- Line: Osterath–Dortmund Süd
- Platforms: 2

Construction
- Accessible: Platform 1 only

Other information
- Station code: 5254
- DS100 code: KRHO
- IBNR: 8005065
- Category: 5
- Fare zone: VRR: 334
- Website: www.bahnhof.de

History
- Opened: 1 October 1907
- Former names: Rheinhausen; Rheinhausen (Nrh)

Services
Preceding station	DB Regio NRW	Following station
Rheinhausen towards Aachen Hbf	RB 33	Duisburg-Hochfeld Süd towards Essen-Steele
Preceding station	VIAS	Following station
Rheinhausen towards Mönchengladbach Hbf	RB 35	Duisburg-Hochfeld Süd towards Gelsenkirchen Hbf
Location
- Location within North Rhine-Westphalia

Rheinhausen Ost (east) is a station designated as a Haltepunkt (halt) in the Duisburg suburb of Rheinhausen in the German state of North Rhine-Westphalia. It was built in 1907 after the commissioning of the Rheinhausen–Kleve railway on the left (western) bank of the Lower Rhine for workers of the Krupp’s steel works. The station was directly at the main entrance to the steel works, Tor 1 (gate 1), which is now heritage-listed.

== History ==
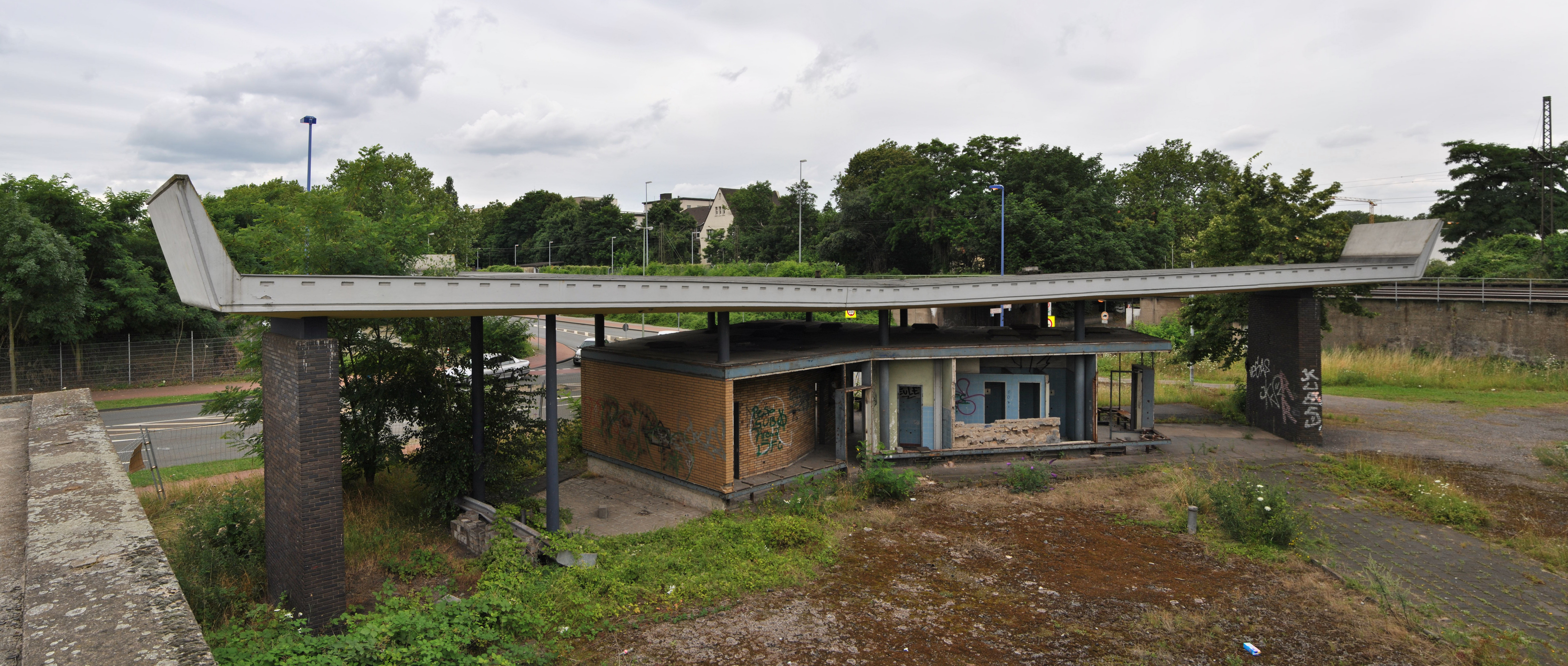
Heritage-listed gate 1 of the Krupp’s steel works opposite the station; the gatehouse has now been demolished, 2012

Its construction resulted from the visit of the German Emperor Wilhelm II to the Krupp’s steel works, which took place one year before, on 9 August 1906. A temporary halt was set up at the location of the later station. "At 10:05 am, the emperor arrived at the halt in the imperial special train and was received by the board of directors of Krupp", according to an Extrablatt des Allgemeinen Anzeigers für den Kreis Mörs ("special edition of the general gazette of the District of Mörs"). On departure, the men's chorus of the Krupp company was placed opposite the imperial saloon car.

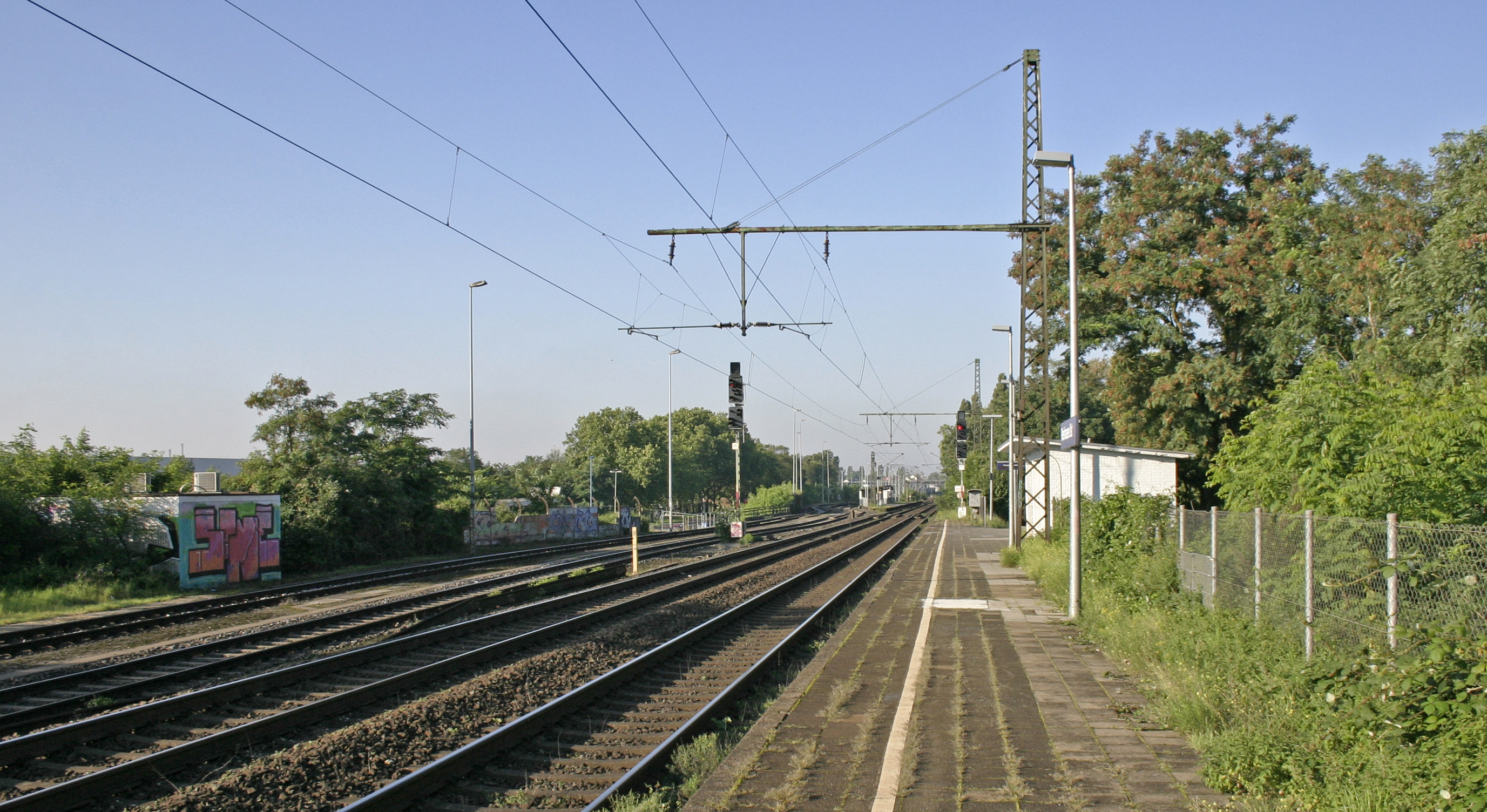
Platform 1 looking towards Krefeld in 2015

On 16 May 1907, the Krupp company requested permanent station for works traffic in Atrop, a district of Hochemmerich, to add to the existing Rheinhausen station, which was located on the territory of the former municipality of Friemersheim at the headquarters of the Krupp company. The then rivalry between the two municipalities led to a fierce dispute over the designation of the stations; some argued that Rheinhausen station should have been renamed Friemersheim; Hochemmerich initially wanted the name of Atrop for the Rheinhausen Ost station and the Krupp's works wanted the name of Friedrich-Alfred-Hütte (after Friedrich Alfred Krupp, with Hütte meaning "works"). The original Rheinhausen station, which was established in 1877, was renamed Friemersheim when the new halt was opened, which was given the name of Rheinhausen. After the merger of the municipality with the rural community of Rheinhausen in 1923 it was given the slightly amended name of Rheinhausen (Nrh) (Nrh standing for Niederrhein or Lower Rhine). The current name was adopted in 1936/37.

The Prussian Minister of Public Works Paul von Breitenbach approved the station under the condition that only the workers at the Krupp's steel works could use it. There were, therefore, only four trains at each shift change. Ticket were issued by the gatekeeper of the Krupp's works, while the station itself was occupied by platform staff. The municipality of Hochemmerich criticised the lack of services at the station, leading to an increase in services to ten trains to Krefeld and twelve trains to Duisburg each day. Later, the station was opened for general traffic. The station was initially equipped with two side platforms. While the northern platform for trains toward Krefeld could be reached via an underpass, passengers to Duisburg originally had to cross the line on foot.

After the merger of Friemersheim and Hochemmerich into the municipality of Rheinhausen in 1923, a memorandum was produced four years later proposing the merger of the two stations into a central station. The mayor of Rheinhausen reaffirmed the project in 1935, as did the director of the Krupp's works, Bruno Fugmann, the following year. This was endorsed by Deutsche Reichsbahn in 1936, but preparations for war and finally World War II itself ended these plans. In the 1960s, station plans were restarted by the municipal administration (now Rheinhausen-Mitte), but they were only half-heartedly considered by the Deutsche Bundesbahn administration in Krefeld. After the municipal reorganisation and the associated incorporation of Rheinhausen into Duisburg in 1975, these plans were abandoned.

With the end of the Krupp's steel works in 1993, the halt lost its importance. Now only two Regionalbahn services an hour stop, running towards Duisburg Hauptbahnhof and Krefeld Hauptbahnhof. The RE42 and the RB31 services are no longer scheduled to stop at Rheinhausen Ost.

The station entrance for services towards Rheinhausen and Krefeld contained a restaurant that was called Ritzendiele ("Ritz hall") by the Krupp workers, as well as a ticket office. In 19 September 1994, the building burnt down and it was then demolished and not replaced.

== Services ==
The station is served by Regionalbahn services, the RB33 (Rhein-Niers-Bahn) and the RB35 (Emscher-Niederrhein-Bahn). They both run hourly between Duisburg and Mönchengladbach, together providing a service every half hour. The RB33 starts from Essen and continues via Mönchengladbach to Aachen and the RB35 continues via Duisburg to Wesel.

Line	Route	Frequency
RB 33; Rhein-Niers-Bahn	Essen – Mülheim – Duisburg – Rheinhausen Ost – Krefeld – Mönchengladbach – Aachen	60 mins
RB 35; Emscher-Niederrhein-Bahn	Gelsenkirchen – Oberhausen Hbf – Duisburg – Rheinhausen Ost – Krefeld – Mönchengladbach – Aachen	60 mins (weekdays)

To the south of the halt there are non-electrified factory lines, which branch off towards the Rhine bridge from the former Krupp's works, now Logport, and from the various companies in the Logport area and Krupp's own former port and from the container terminal that has since been built there.

Niederrheinische Verkehrsbetriebe operates bus route 914 (Moers – Friemersheim) and Duisburger Verkehrsgesellschaft operates bus route 922 (Winkelhausen – Friemersheim) at the station. The fares of both operators are set by the Verkehrsverbund Rhein-Ruhr.

Line	Route	Interval
914	Moers Königlicher Hof – Moers Bf – Schwafheim – Bergheim – Rheinhausen Markt – Rheinhausen Ost Bf – Logport-Center – Rheinhausen Bf/Kaiserstraße – Friemersheim Markt – Gewerbegebiet Hohenbudberg	Peak: 30 min Non-peak: 60 min
922	Winkelhausen Bruchstraße – Asterlagen – Rheinhausen Markt – Rheinhausen Ost Bf – Rheinhausen Bf/Kaiserstraße – Friemersheim Markt	Peak: 5 times daily

A street passes in front of the station with a sharp curve, which was popularly called the Atrop underpass until the widening of the passage. It was an accident blackspot, particularly during shift changes at Krupp. It was, also referred to as the "mousetrap". This road, which was single-lane until 1954, was also used by tramline 2 (Homberg–Friemersheim), also known as the Krumme Linie (crooked line), from 13 July 1913 to 25 September 1954. Since then the bus lines mentioned have run on it.
