= König-Heinrich-Platz station =

Metro station in Duisburg, Germany

König-Heinrich-Platz
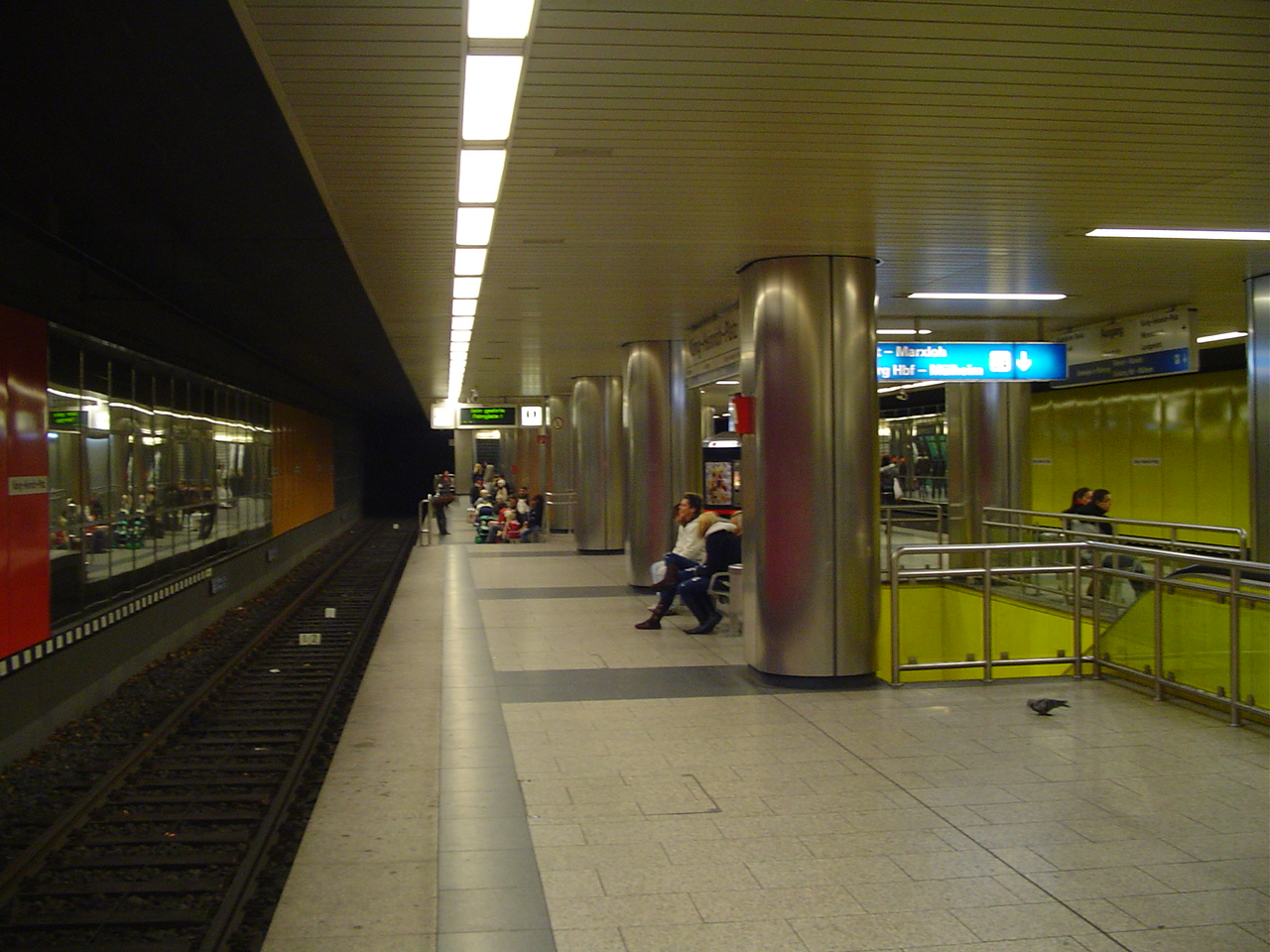
- Upper level of König-Heinrich-Platz station

General information
- Location: Duisburg; Germany
- Coordinates: 51.4328513°N 6.7686549°E
- System: Rhine-Ruhr Stadtbahn station
- Platforms: 2 island platforms
- Tracks: 4

Construction
- Structure type: Underground station
- Platform levels: 2
- Accessible: 1

Other information
- Fare zone: VRR: 330

History
- Opened: 11 July 1992
- Electrified: 750 V DC

Services
Preceding station	Rhine-Ruhr Stadtbahn	Following station
Steinsche Gasse towards Universität Ost/Botanischer Garten	U79	Duisburg Hbf towards Duisburg-Meiderich Süd
Preceding station	Straßenbahn Duisburg	Following station
Duisburg Rathaus towards Obermarxloh Schleife	901	Duisburg Hbf towards Mülheim (Ruhr) Hbf
Steinsche Gasse towards Mannesmann Tor II	903	Duisburg Hbf towards Dinslaken
Location

König-Heinrich-Platz is an underground Stadtbahn station in central Duisburg, located under the Königstraße, west of the square after which it is named. It consists of two island platforms located on two levels. The upper one is used by trains from or to southern Duisburg, the lower one by trains from or to the Ruhrort and all trains terminating here.

== Platform levels ==
The upper-level platforms are divided into a high and a low part. The high part is used by U79 trains which use high-floor light rail cars, the low part by trams of line 903 which are only equipped for low platforms. In the walls behind the tracks, there are several mirrors which lead to the impression that the platform level is larger than it actually is.

The lower level is only used by trams in regular service, so there is only a low platform there. At some occasions, also light rail vehicles stopped here; then the movable stairs of these cars were used to allow passengers getting on or off the train.

== History ==
Before the opening of the underground line in Duisburg, trams ran overground on the Königstraße, where they also called at a stop "König-Heinrich-Platz", located above the current underground station. On 11 July 1992 the tram routes in the inner city of Duisburg were replaced by an underground section. At this date, the overground stop was replaced by the underground station.

== Other facilities ==
West of the station, there is a storage siding where light rail trains can be stabled and reversed. It is only accessible from the lower station. East of the station, some tracks change height so that at Duisburg Hauptbahnhof station, the trains going in the same direction stop at the same level, not trains of the same line. This is done completely grade-separated.

From the eastern mezzanine, there is a direct connection to the basement of the adjacent mall "Forum Duisburg". The western mezzanine offered toilets when the station opened, but these were closed in the meantime.
