= Emscher-Niederrhein-Bahn =

German railway service

RB 35 Emscher-Niederrhein-Bahn

Overview
- Owner: VRR
- Line number: RB 35
- Locale: North Rhine-Westphalia, Germany

Service
- Route number: 416, 490
- Operator(s): VIAS

Technical
- Line length: 73 km (45 mi)
- Operating speed: 160 km/h (99 mph) (maximum)

The Emscher-Niederrhein-Bahn (RB 35) is a Regionalbahn service in the German state of North Rhine-Westphalia. It runs hourly between Gelsenkirchen and Duisburg with Mönchengladbach. Its name refers to the Emscher river (which runs near Duisburg and Gelsenkirchen) and the Lower Rhine (which the service crosses between Duisburg-Hochfeld Süd and Rheinhausen-Ost).

== History ==
Before 2016, there was already a service numbered as RB 35, operating under the name of Der Weseler. It ran mainly between Wesel and Duisburg Hbf and was extended during the peak hour from Duisburg to Düsseldorf and once a day to Cologne, as well as from Wesel to Emmerich and it thus functioned to relieve the Rhein-Express (RE 5). From the timetable change of 2016, the route was extended beyond Duisburg to Mönchengladbach, which complemented the northern section of the Rhein-Niers-Bahn. The RE 5 was shortened to run on the Wesel–Duisburg–Düsseldorf–Köln–Bonn–Koblenz section and the section from Emmerich to Wesel was removed from the joint operations of the RE 5 and the RB 35; and now forms part of the Rhein-IJssel-Express (RE 19) service. The section from Oberhausen to Wesel was replaced by a section from Oberhausen to Gelsenkirchen at the Rhine-Ruhr S-Bahn's timetable change in December 2019. Since then the new Wupper-Lippe-Express (RE 49) from Wesel to Wuppertal has replaced the section between Oberhausen and Wesel.

== Operations ==
The line only runs from Monday to Friday between 5 a.m. and 7 p.m. Together with the Niers-Haard-Express (RE 42) and the Rhein-Niers-Bahn (RB 33), three services an hour are operated on the Duisburg–Mönchengladbach section. The section between Duisburg and Gelsenkirchen is also served by the Rhein-Emscher-Bahn (RB 32), which stops at all intermediate stations (replacing a service of the S 2), producing a half-hourly service. In Gelsenkirchen there is a direct connection to the Rhein-Haard-Express (RE 2) and the Niers-Haard-Express (RB 42) towards Münster, although the connections are not at the same platform.

== Operator ==
The line is operated by VIAS. VIAS replaced Abellio Rail NRW in early 2022 after the latter's insolvency. Until 10 December 2016, the operator was DB Regio NRW.

== Rolling stock ==
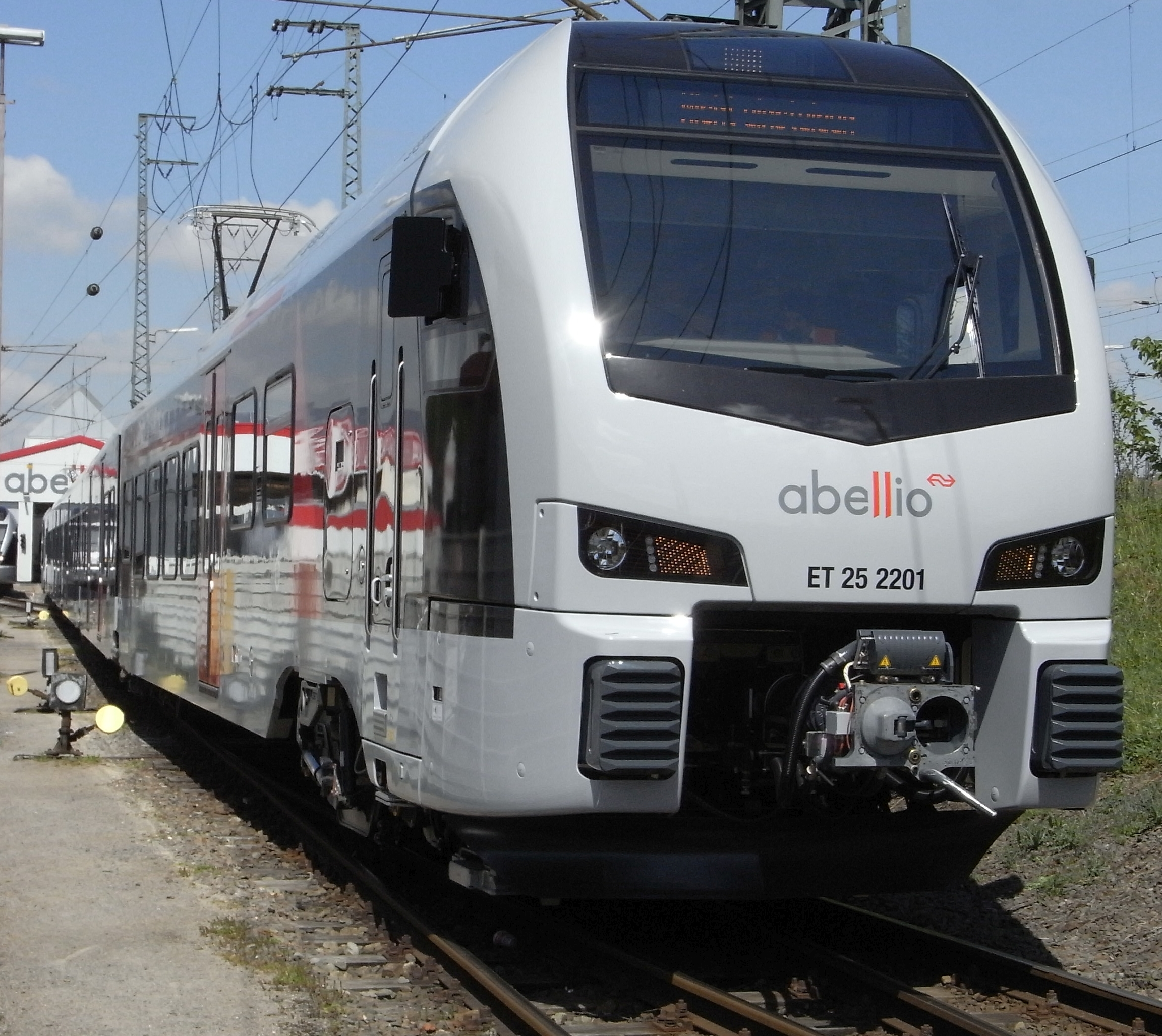
Multiple unit used for the Rhein-IJssel-Express in the Abellio depot, April 2016

Stadler FLIRT 3 sets are used on the line. Abellio acquired a total of 21 railcars of this class for lines RE 19, RE 19a and RB 35.

The operator maintains a workshop in the immediate vicinity of Duisburg Hauptbahnhof for rolling stock maintenance.

== Railway lines used ==
The service uses the following railway lines:

- Duisburg–Dortmund railway from Gelsenkirchen to Duisburg
- the whole length of the Duisburg-Ruhrort–Mönchengladbach railway

== See also ==
- List of regional rail lines in North Rhine-Westphalia
