= Duisburg Hauptbahnhof =

Railway station in Duisburg, Germany

Duisburg Hbf
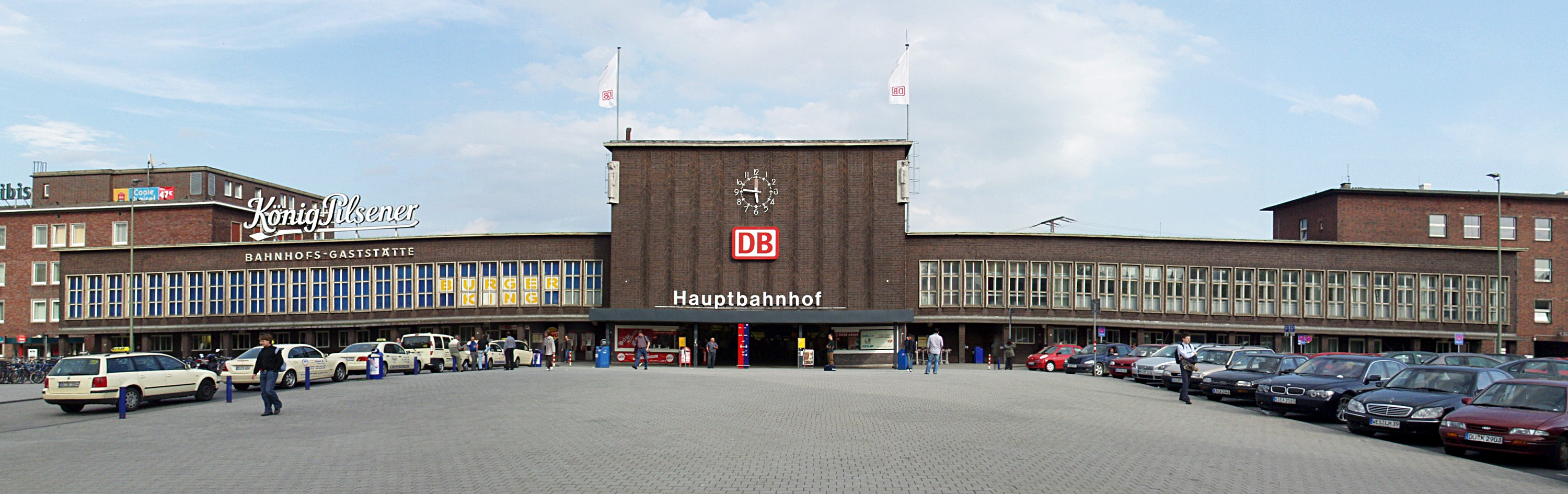
- Station building and forecourt

General information
- Location: Duisburg, North Rhine-Westphalia; Germany
- Coordinates: 51°25′48″N 6°46′34″E
- Owner: Deutsche Bahn
- Operator: DB Netz; DB Station&Service
- Lines: Duisburg–Oberhausen–Dortmund; (Duisburg–)Oberhausen–Arnhem; Duisburg–Essen–Dortmund; Duisburg–Cologne; Duisburg–Mönchengladbach; Duisburg-Moers-(Kamp-Lintfort Süd Landesgartenschau 2020)-Xanten; Duisburg–Duisburg-Entenfang; Duisburg–Bottrop(–Quakenbrück)
- Platforms: 12

Construction
- Accessible: Yes
- Architect: Eduard Lyonel Wehner
- Architectural style: Functionalism

Other information
- Station code: 1374
- DS100 code: EDG
- IBNR: 8000086
- Category: 1
- Fare zone: VRR: 330
- Website: www.bahnhof.de

History
- Opened: 1846 CME station 1862 BME station 1870 RhE station 1886 PSE station 1934 DRG station

Passengers
- ca. 110,000 daily
Services
Preceding station	Eurostar	Following station
Düsseldorf Airport towards Paris-Nord	Eurostar	Essen Hbf towards Dortmund Hbf
Preceding station	DB Fernverkehr	Following station
Düsseldorf Hbf towards Passau Hbf	ICE 1 Sprinter	Essen Hbf towards Hamburg-Altona
Düsseldorf Airport towards Köln Hbf	ICE 10	Essen Hbf towards Berlin Ostbahnhof
Düsseldorf Hbf towards Aachen Hbf	ICE 14	Essen Hbf towards Berlin Ostbahnhof
Krefeld Hbf towards Aachen Hbf	ICE 14	Essen Hbf towards Berlin Ostbahnhof
Düsseldorf Hbf towards Köln Hbf	ICE 33	Essen Hbf towards Westerland (Sylt)
Düsseldorf Hbf towards Köln Hbf	IC 35	Oberhausen Hbf towards Emden Außenhafen or Norddeich Mole
Düsseldorf Hbf towards München Hbf	ICE 41	Essen Hbf towards Dortmund Hbf
Düsseldorf Hbf towards München Hbf	ICE 42	Essen Hbf towards Dortmund Hbf
Düsseldorf Hbf towards Basel SBB	ICE 43	Essen Hbf towards Hamburg-Altona
Düsseldorf Hbf towards Stuttgart Hbf	ICE 47	Essen Hbf towards Dortmund Hbf
Düsseldorf Flughafen towards Köln Hbf	IC 51	Essen Hbf towards Gera Hbf
Düsseldorf Hbf towards Oberstdorf	IC 55 Allgäu	Essen Hbf towards Dortmund Hbf
Düsseldorf Hbf towards Graz Hbf	ICE 62	Oberhausen Hbf towards Münster Hbf
Düsseldorf Hbf towards Innsbruck Hbf	ICE 62 Bodensee	Essen Hbf towards Dortmund Hbf
Düsseldorf Hbf towards Frankfurt (Main) Hbf or München Hbf	ICE 78	Oberhausen Hbf towards Amsterdam Centraal
Düsseldorf Hbf towards Wien Hbf	ICE 91	Essen Hbf towards Dortmund Hbf
Preceding station		Following station
Düsseldorf Hbf towards Köln Hbf	FLX 20	Essen Hbf towards Hamburg Hbf
Düsseldorf Hbf towards Aachen Hbf	FLX 30	Essen Hbf towards Leipzig Hbf
Preceding station	National Express Germany	Following station
Düsseldorf Airport towards Aachen Hbf	RE 1 (NRW-Express)	Mülheim (Ruhr) Hbf towards Hamm (Westf) Hbf
Düsseldorf Airport towards Koblenz Hbf	RE 5 (Rhein-Express)	Oberhausen Hbf towards Wesel
Düsseldorf Airport towards Cologne/Bonn Airport	RE 6 (Rhein-Weser-Express)	Mülheim (Ruhr) Hbf towards Minden
Düsseldorf Airport towards Düsseldorf Hbf	RE 11 (Rhein-Hellweg-Express)	Mülheim (Ruhr) Hbf towards Kassel-Wilhelmshöhe
Preceding station	DB Regio NRW	Following station
Düsseldorf Airport towards Düsseldorf Hbf	RE 2	Mülheim (Ruhr) Hbf towards Osnabrück Hbf
Rheinhausen towards Mönchengladbach Hbf	RE 42	Mülheim (Ruhr) Hbf towards Münster Hbf
Terminus	RB 32	Oberhausen Hbf towards Dortmund Hbf
Duisburg-Hochfeld Süd towards Aachen Hbf	RB 33	Mülheim-Styrum towards Essen-Steele
Preceding station		Following station
Düsseldorf Airport towards Düsseldorf Hbf	RE 3	Oberhausen Hbf towards Hamm (Westf) Hbf
Preceding station	NordWestBahn	Following station
Rheinhausen towards Moers	RE 44	Oberhausen Hbf towards Bottrop Hbf
Rheinhausen towards Xanten	RB 31	Terminus
Preceding station	VIAS	Following station
Düsseldorf Airport towards Düsseldorf Hbf	RE 19	Oberhausen Hbf towards Arnhem Centraal or Bocholt
Duisburg-Hochfeld Süd towards Mönchengladbach Hbf	RB 35	Oberhausen Hbf towards Gelsenkirchen Hbf
Preceding station	Rhine-Ruhr S-Bahn	Following station
Duisburg Schlenk towards Solingen Hbf	S1	Mülheim-Styrum towards Dortmund Hbf
Preceding station	Rhine-Ruhr Stadtbahn	Following station
König-Heinrich-Platz towards Universität Ost/Botanischer Garten	U79	Duissern towards Duisburg-Meiderich Süd
Preceding station	Straßenbahn Duisburg	Following station
König-Heinrich-Platz towards Obermarxloh Schleife	901	Lutherplatz towards Mülheim (Ruhr) Hbf
König-Heinrich-Platz towards Mannesmann Tor II	903	Duissern towards Dinslaken
Location

Duisburg Hauptbahnhof is a railway station in the city of Duisburg in western Germany. It is situated at the meeting point of many important national and international railway lines in the Northwestern Ruhr valley.

== Lines ==
The station is situated at the northern end of the relatively straight Duisburg to Düsseldorf railway line which has to cope with one of the highest daily loads in continental Europe. This line is slated to be widened to six tracks in the near future. Currently it has four—and in some places five—tracks. The line to Krefeld and Mönchengladbach runs to the south. This crosses the River Rhine and then splits into the main line and a branch to Moers and Xanten at Rheinhausen. North of the station, seven tracks run to the River Ruhr crossing (which is a sight on the Route der Industriekultur (Route of industrial heritage) due to a maze of girder bridges) where a three track line split for Oberhausen and on to Arnhem and the other line runs to Dortmund via Gelsenkirchen. The four-tracked main line turns east and runs via Essen and Bochum to Dortmund.

== Operational usage ==
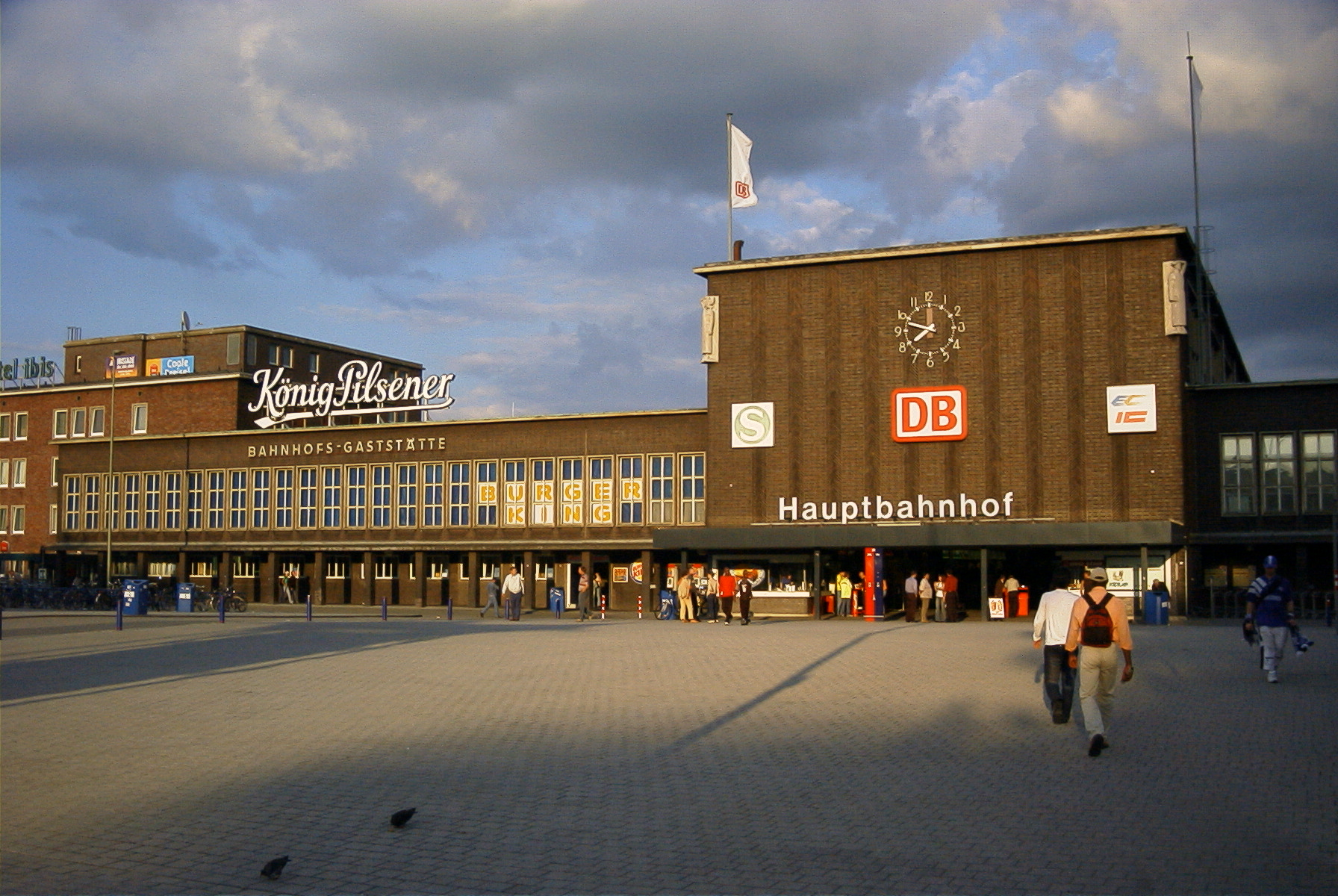
Duisburg Hauptbahnhof, 2004.

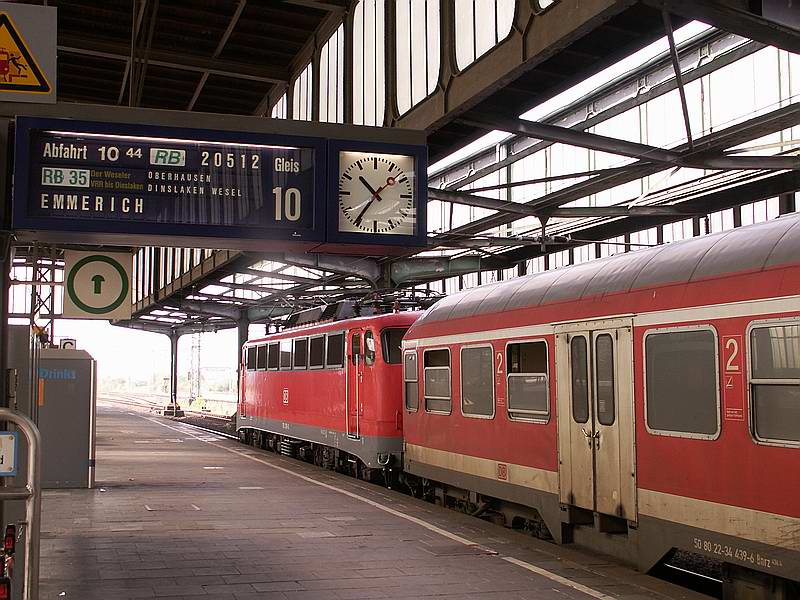
Inside the station

=== Railway ===
The station is an important hub for InterCityExpress, InterCity and EuroCity trains from and to the Netherlands, Berlin, Switzerland, Munich, Frankfurt and Cologne. It also is an important connection point for RegionalExpress and RegionalBahn lines and has two S-Bahn lines of the Rhein-Ruhr S-Bahn calling at the station. A nearby Stadtbahn station offers local connections as well as trams to Mülheim an der Ruhr and Düsseldorf.

=== Local travel ===
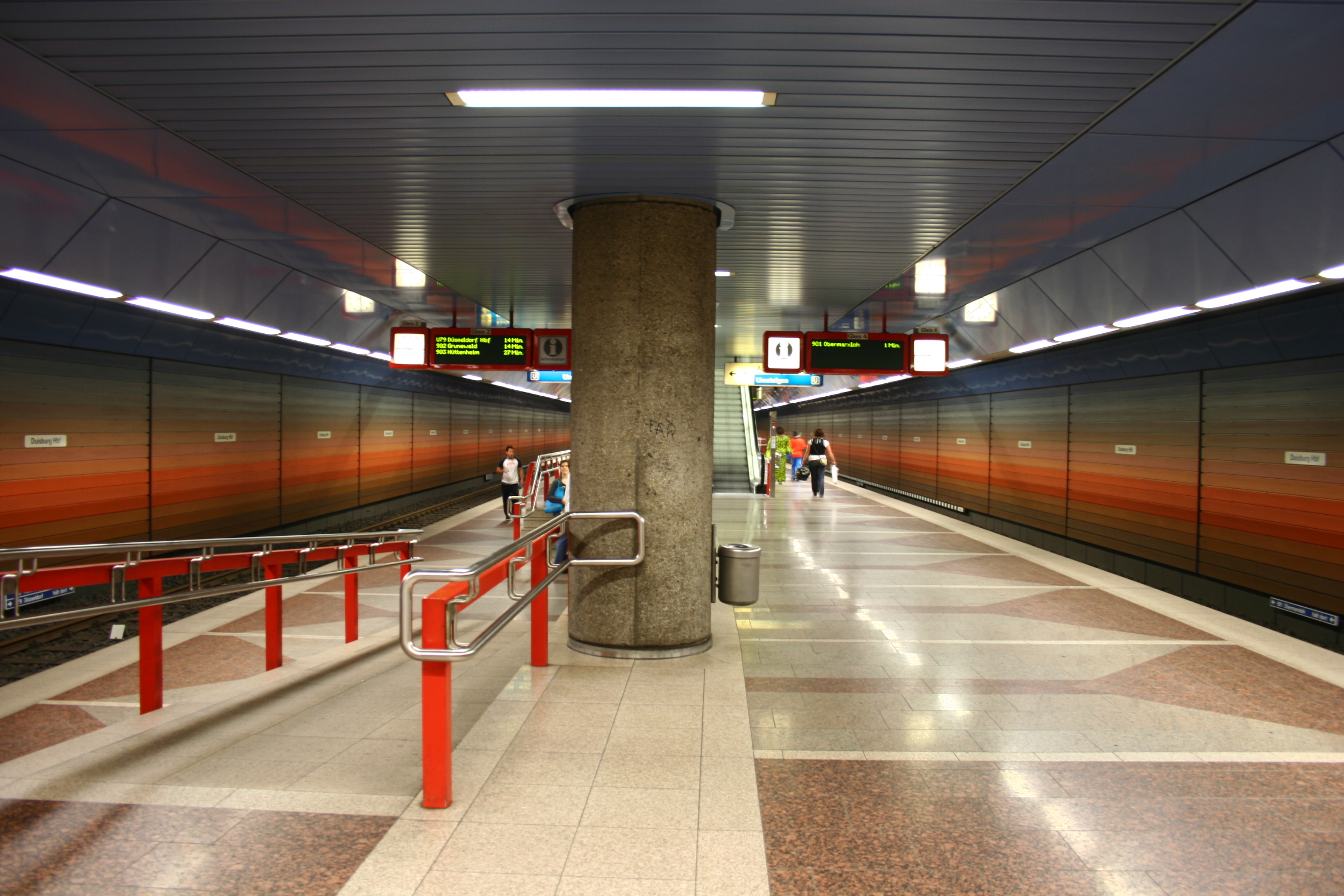
Underground station of Duisburg Stadtbahn (part of VRR) in 2009

Trams and buses call at the northern concourse (not connected to the main hall). There is another bus station at the eastern end of the main concourse, but not all lines serving the station call there. Taxis are available at both ends of the main concourse. The station is directly connected to the motorway A59, which runs under the plaza in front of the main entrance. Long-distance coaches depart from a small bus station at the city end of the station (behind the taxi ranks, to the left).

== Architecture ==
The current station building dates from the 1930s and was modelled after the station in Königsberg. After WW2 it was extensively rebuilt and many features (such as murals in the main concourse) were lost. Its 6 platforms are covered by a train shed at their southern ends and modern canopies to the north where there is a second concourse housing the bus and tram stops.

The station today has a rather drab feeling with the train shed in need of repair as there are quite a number of holes in the roof. Work to replace the roof and platforms commenced in August 2022, starting with tracks 12 and 13. This work is expected to take several years

== Amenities ==
As is usual with station of its size, Duisburg Hbf has a number of shops on its concourse and in the main hall. These include a book shop, a barber shop, several telecommunication accessories dealers, 2 bars, a small gambling arcade and several bakers and fast food stalls. The booking hall is located in the main hall (city exit), and lockers are provided at the beginning of the concourse to the right, next to the toilets. In the station building outside the concourse there is a hotel and local newspaper offices, and there used to be a fairly large night club which closed in early 2006 and has remained empty since.

== History ==
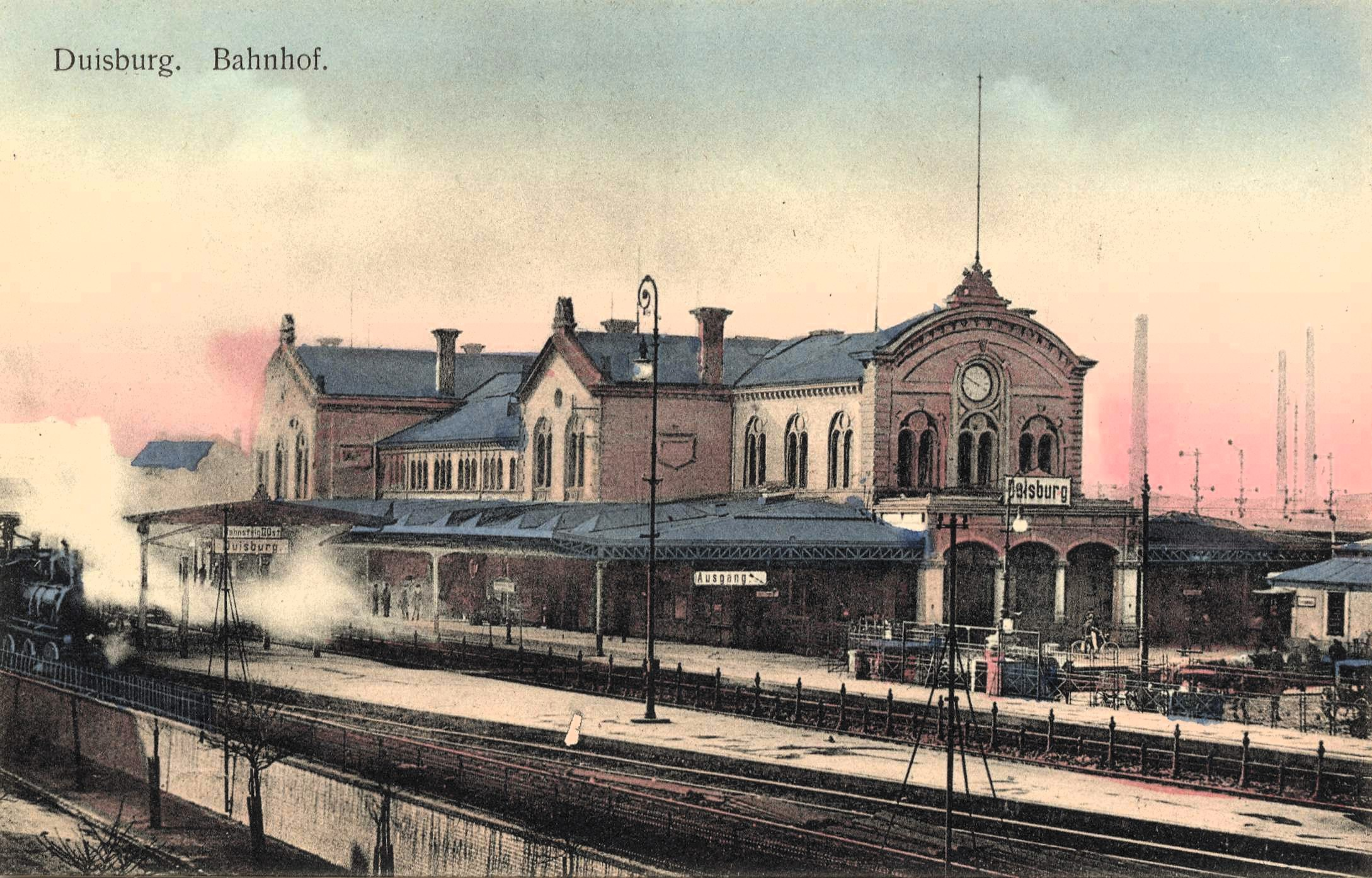
The former station complex in 1910.

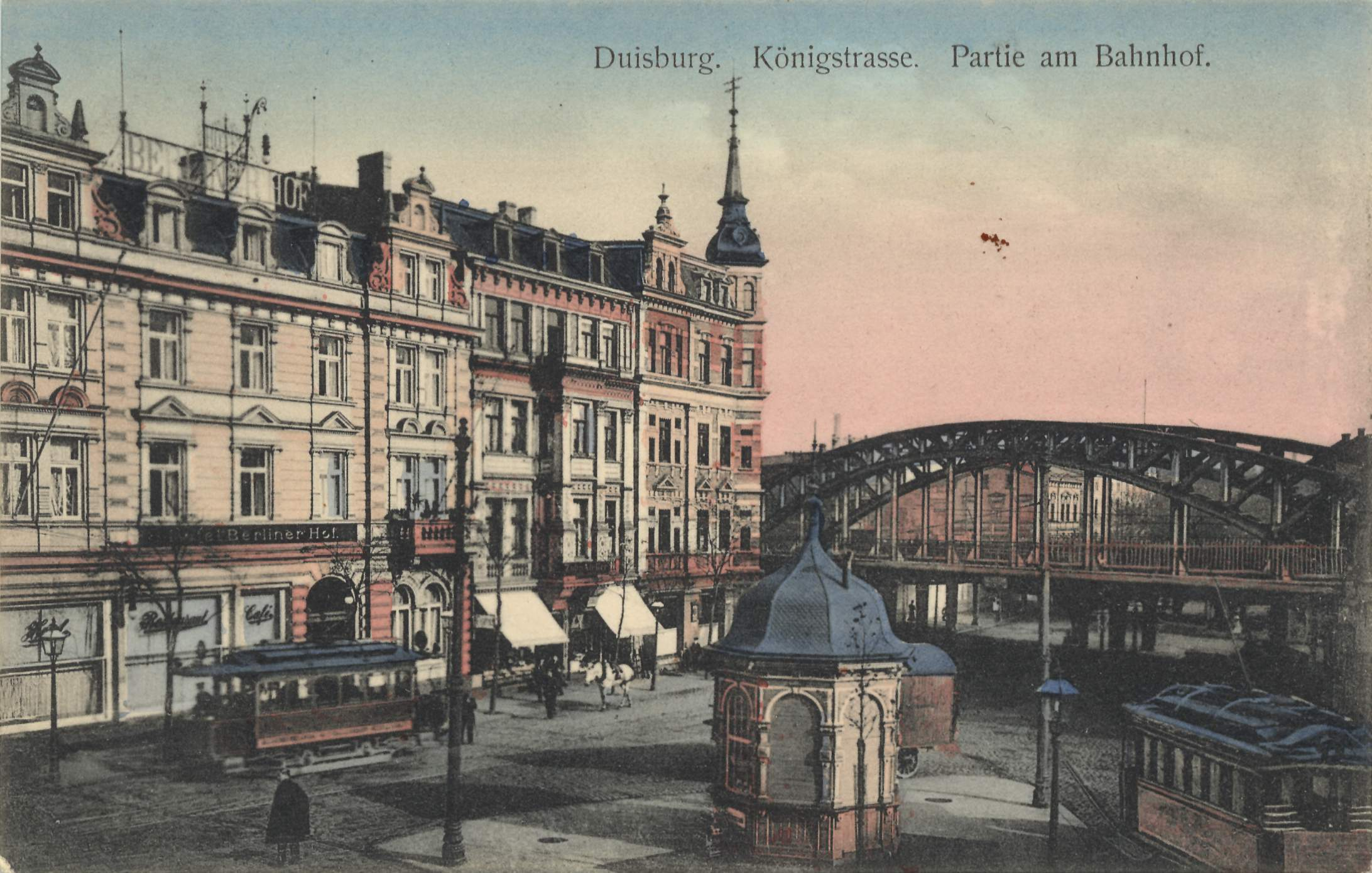
The northern area around Duisburg station at Königstraße, 1911.

=== Former private railways ===
Duisburg station was opened in Duisburg on 9 February 1846 by the Cologne-Minden Railway Company (Cöln-Mindener Eisenbahn-Gesellschaft, CME) along with the second section of its trunk line from Cologne-Deutz to Minden. On 15 May 1847 the line was extended to Hamm and Duisburg station became a through station on the line from Düsseldorf to Oberhausen.

Fifteen years later, in 1862, the Bergisch-Märkische Railway Company (Bergisch-Märkische Eisenbahn-Gesellschaft, BME), opened its east–west route through the Ruhr region from Dortmund and Witten to Duisburg. Its station was built close to the existing station, but it was a terminal station that was approached only from the northeast, not a through station.

Finally, on 15 February 1870, a three kilometre long branch line was opened by the Rhenish Railway Company (Rheinische Eisenbahn-Gesellschaft, RHE) from the Rheinhausen–Hochfeld train ferry to Duisburg, which became the starting point of its new route to Quakenbrück, completed in 1879. It built a through station next to other stations in Duisburg.

=== Prussian state railways ===
The station buildings of the three railway companies survived until after their nationalisation when they became part of the Prussian state railways. In the 1880s the three stations were demolished and a joint station building was built on an island between the platforms of the various lines.

The entrance to this building was to the north on Mülheimer Straße, which the lines crossed at that time over level crossings. It was not until the late 19th and early 20th centuries that all tracks had been raised above street level.

=== Deutsche Reichsbahn ===
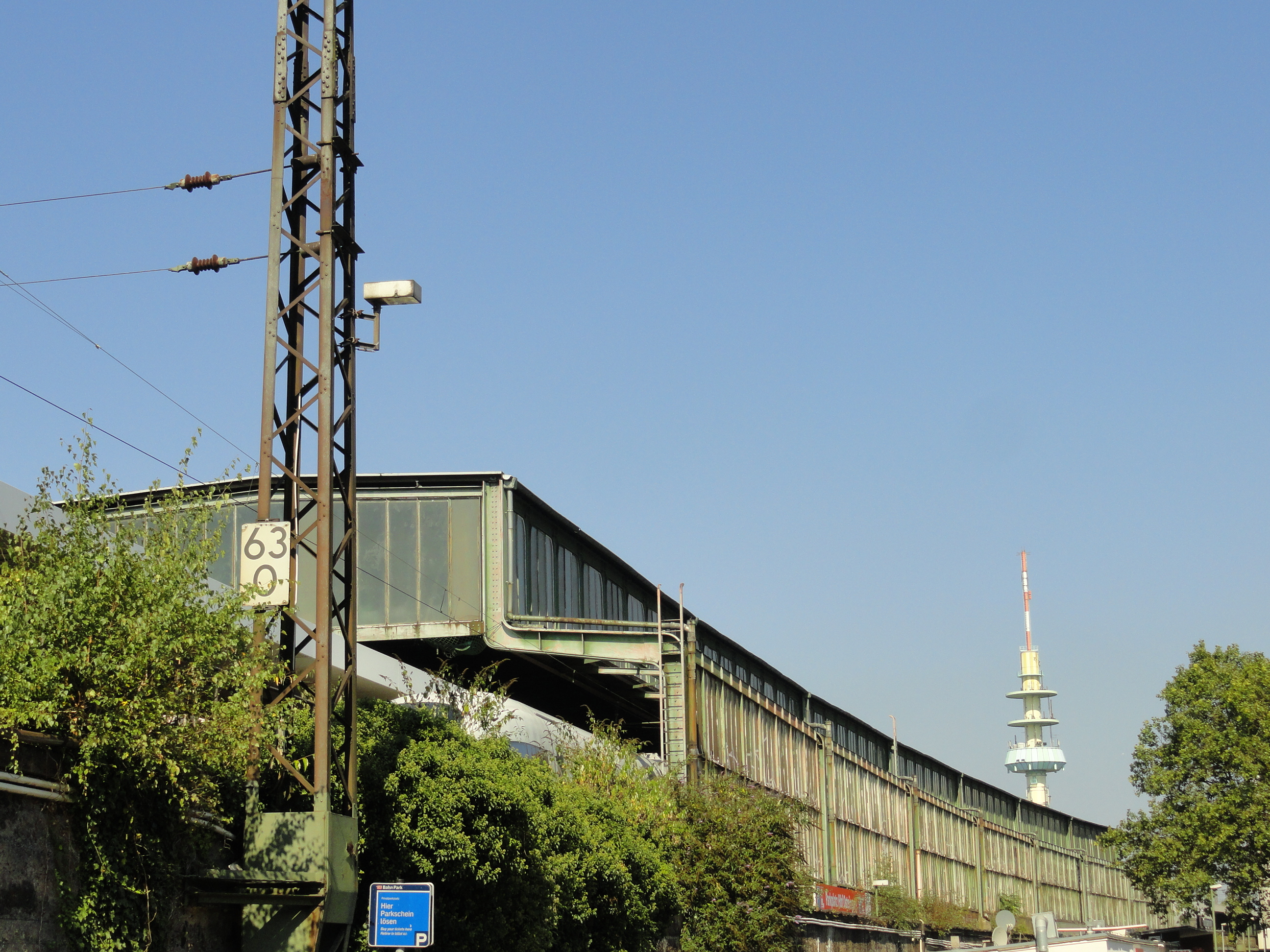
Historical sight of the east side

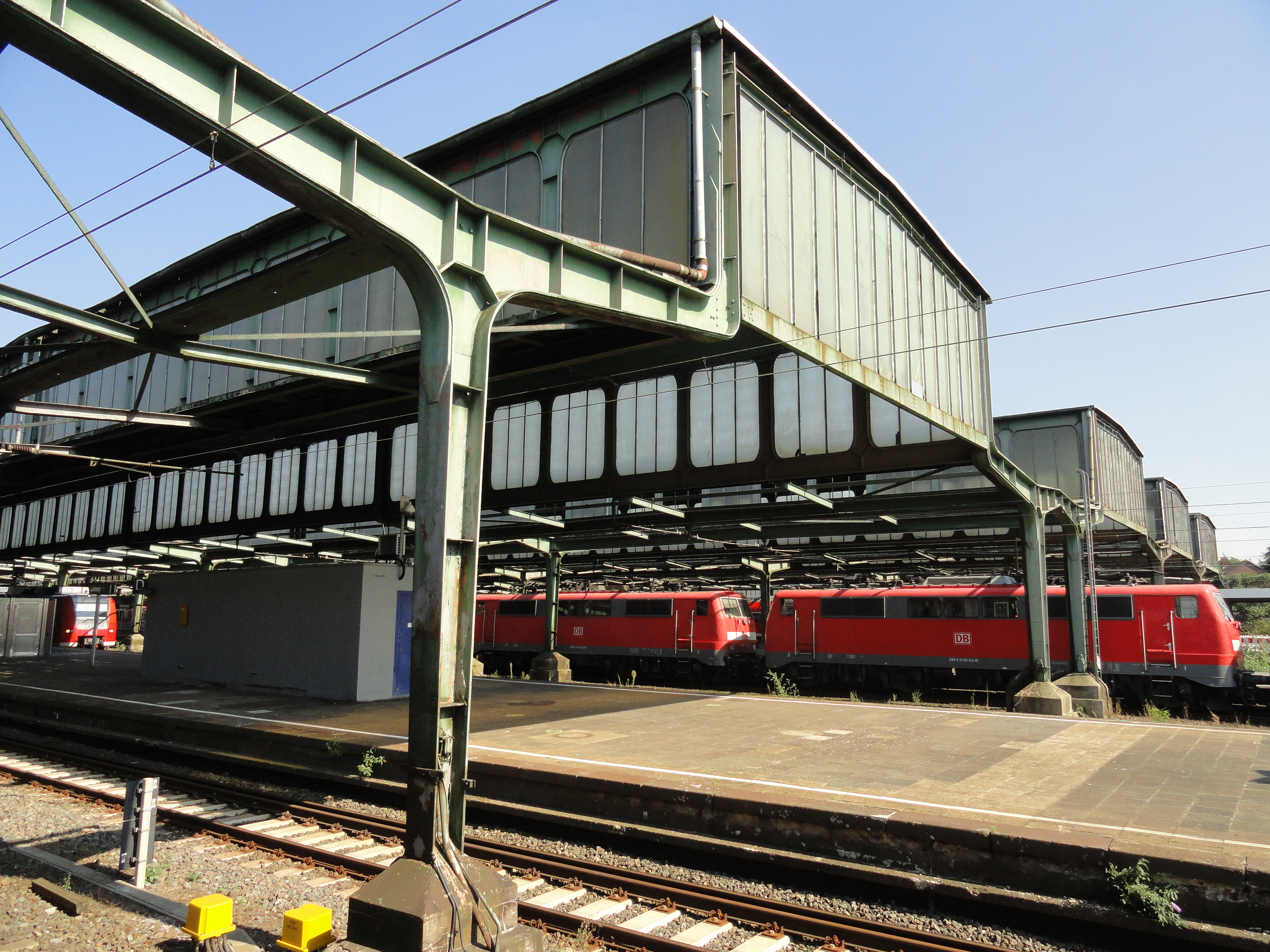
"Floating" platform canopies

At the beginning of the 1930s, the station, which had been taken over by Deutsche Reichsbahn in 1920 when it absorbed the Prussian State Railway, was extended and rebuilt to its present size. The buildings have since been replaced.

The still-existing entrance building of the station at Portsmouthplatz was built from 1931 to 1934 under the direction of the government architect Johannes Ziertmann (an architect at the railway division of Essen) and was considered one of the most modern station buildings of its time. It is comparable with the entrance buildings in Düsseldorf, Königsberg (Pr.) and Oberhausen, built in the same period. The two sculptures at the front of a steel frame structure built for the ticket hall are by the Essen sculptor Joseph Enseling. The platform canopies were built with Vierendeel trusses and are structurally similar to the canopies at Düsseldorf Hauptbahnhof, which were scrapped in the 1980s, and follow the conceptually similar canopies of Darmstadt Hauptbahnhof built before the First World War. The Duisburg platform canopies were the first all-welded steel construction of this size.

During the Second World War the station was heavily damaged in a heavy bombing attack on Duisburg by allied forces.

=== Deutsche Bundesbahn ===
The station has been rebuilt several times since the war. In 1992, as part of the inauguration of the Duisburg Stadtbahn (light rail), the new northern connecting hall (Verknüpfungshalle) was opened, all six platforms were lengthened to several hundred metres over the former road underpass connecting Mühlheimerstraße and Königstraße and provided with simple platform roofs, which are easily distinguished from the old station hall.

=== Deutsche Bahn ===
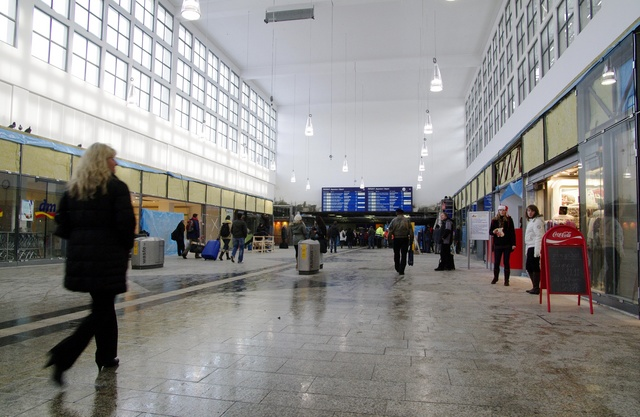
Lobby shortly before the completion of the renovation

On 12 December 2008 Deutsche Bahn and the state of North Rhine-Westphalia announced that much-needed renovation work would begin in mid of 2009. The total cost was estimated at €60 million. The first phase includes the renovation of the lobby and the underpass. Among other things, the false ceilings would be removed and the building returned to its original state. Renovation work on the monumental facade is planned. The cost for the first phase is estimated at €10.1 million.

On 24 July 2009, the first phase of renovation work began and the major renovations in the entrance hall were completed on 22 December 2009. From January 2010 work started on the renovation of the pedestrian tunnel. In a second, much more expensive construction phase, the railway platforms, railway tracks and the dilapidated roof were due to be rehabilitated in 2011. However work on the roof and platforms only commenced in August 2022, with the first two platforms to be completed during 2023

== Train services ==
Numerous long-distance, regional and S-Bahn services stop at the station.

=== Long distance ===
In the 2026 timetable, the following long-distance services stopped at the station:

Line	Route	Frequency
ICE 1	Hamburg-Altona – Hamburg – Essen – Duisburg – Düsseldorf – Cologne – Bonn – Koblenz – Mainz – Frankfurt Airport – Frankfurt – Würzburg – Nuremberg – Regensburg – Passau	Three times a day
ICE 10	Berlin Ostbahnhof – Berlin – (Wolfsburg –) Hannover – Bielefeld – Hamm – Dortmund – Bochum – Essen – Duisburg – Düsseldorf Airport – Düsseldorf (– Cologne)	Hourly
ICE 33	Westerland – Niebüll – Itzehoe – Hamburg – Bremen – Osnabrück – Münster – Gelsenkirchen – Essen – Duisburg – Düsseldorf – Cologne	1 train pair
IC 35	Norddeich Mole – Emden – Rheine – Münster – Recklinghausen – Wanne-Eickel – Gelsenkirchen – Oberhausen – Duisburg – Düsseldorf Airport – Düsseldorf – Cologne	Every 2 hours
ICE 41	(Dortmund –) Essen – Duisburg – Düsseldorf – Köln Messe/Deutz – Frankfurt Airport – Frankfurt – Aschaffenburg – Würzburg – Nuremberg – Munich (one train pair: Düsseldorf – Duisburg – Essen – Dortmund – Hamm – Paderborn – Warburg – Kassel-Wilhelmshöhe – Fulda – Würzburg – Nuremberg – Ingolstadt – Munich)	Hourly
ICE 42	(Hamburg-Altona – Hamburg – Bremen – Münster –) Dortmund – Essen – Duisburg – Düsseldorf – Cologne – Siegburg/Bonn – Frankfurt Airport – Mannheim – Stuttgart – Ulm – Augsburg – Munich	Every 2 hours
ICE 43	Hamburg-Altona – Hamburg – Bremen – Osnabrück – Münster – Dortmund – Essen – Duisburg – Düsseldorf – Cologne – Siegburg/Bonn – Frankfurt Airport – Mannheim – Karlsruhe – Freiburg – Basel	Individual services
ICE 47	Münster/Dortmund – Essen – Duisburg – Düsseldorf – Köln Messe/Deutz – Cologne/Bonn Airport – Frankfurt Airport – Mannheim – Stuttgart	Every 2 hours
IC 51	Gera – Erfurt – Bebra – Kassel-Wilhelmshöhe – Warburg – Paderborn – Hamm – Dortmund – Essen – Duisburg – Düsseldorf	1 train pair
IC 55	Dortmund – Bochum – Essen – Duisburg – Düsseldorf – Cologne – Bonn – Koblenz – Mainz – Mannheim – Heidelberg – Stuttgart – Ulm – Memmingen – Kempten – Oberstdorf	1 train pair
ICE 62	Münster – Wanne-Eickel – Gelsenkirchen – Essen – Duisburg – Düsseldorf – Köln Messe/Deutz – Frankfurt Airport – Mannheim – Stuttgart – Ulm – Augsburg – Munich – Salzburg – Villach – Klagenfurt – Graz	1 train pair
ICE 62	Dortmund – Bochum – Essen – Duisburg – Düsseldorf – Köln Messe/Deutz – Frankfurt Airport – Mannheim – Heidelberg – Stuttgart – Ulm – Friedrichshafen Stadt – Lindau-Reutin – Bregenz – St. Anton – Innsbruck	1 train pair
ICE 78	Amsterdam – Oberhausen – Duisburg – Düsseldorf – Cologne – Frankfurt Airport – Frankfurt	Every 2 hours
ICE 91	Dortmund – Bochum – Essen – Duisburg – Düsseldorf – Cologne – Bonn – Koblenz – Mainz – Frankfurt Airport – Frankfurt – Hanau – Würzburg – Nuremberg – Regensburg – Plattling – Passau – Linz – Vienna	Individual services
Eurostar	Dortmund – Essen – Duisburg – (Düsseldorf Airport –) Düsseldorf – Cologne – Aachen – Liège-Guillemins – Brussels – Paris-Nord	5 train pairs
FLX 20	Hamburg Hbf – Hamburg-Harburg – Osnabrück – Münster – Gelsenkirchen – Essen – Duisburg – Düsseldorf – Cologne	1–3 train pairs
FLX 30	Leipzig – Lutherstadt Wittenberg – Berlin Südkreuz – Berlin Hbf – Berlin-Spandau – Hannover – Bielefeld – Dortmund – Essen – Duisburg – Düsseldorf – Cologne – Aachen	1–2 train pairs

=== Regional ===
In the 2026 timetable, the following regional and S-Bahn services stopped at the station:

Line	Route	Frequency
RE 1 NRW-Express	Aachen – Eschweiler – Düren – Horrem – Cologne – Düsseldorf – Düsseldorf Airport – Duisburg – Mülheim – Essen – Bochum – Dortmund – Hamm	60 min
RE 2 Rhein-Haard-Express	Düsseldorf – Düsseldorf Airport – Duisburg – Mülheim – Essen – Gelsenkirchen – Recklinghausen – Münster – Osnabrück	60 min
RE 3 Rhein-Emscher-Express	Düsseldorf – Duisburg – Oberhausen – Herne-Wanne-Eickel – Gelsenkirchen – Herne – Dortmund – Hamm	60 min
RE 5 Rhein-Express	Wesel – Duisburg – Düsseldorf Airport – Düsseldorf – Cologne – Bonn – Remagen – Andernach – Koblenz	60 min
RE 6 Rhein-Weser-Express	Minden – Herford – Bielefeld – Hamm – Dortmund – Essen – Mülheim – Duisburg – Düsseldorf Airport – Düsseldorf – Neuss – Cologne – Cologne/Bonn Airport	60 min
RE 11; Rhein-Hellweg-Express	Düsseldorf – Düsseldorf Airport – Duisburg – Mülheim – Essen – Dortmund – Hamm – Paderborn (– Kassel-Wilhelmshöhe)	60 min
RE 19; Rhein-IJssel-Express	Arnhem – Emmerich – Wesel – Oberhausen – Duisburg – Düsseldorf Airport – Düsseldorf	60 min
RE 42; Niers-Haard-Express	Münster – Dülmen – Recklinghausen – Essen – Duisburg – Krefeld – Mönchengladbach	60 min
RE 44; Fossa-Emscher-Express	Moers – Rheinhausen – Duisburg – Oberhausen – Bottrop	60 min
RB 31; Niederrheinstrecke	Xanten – Moers – Duisburg	60 min
RB 32; Rhein-Emscher-Bahn	Dortmund – Gelsenkirchen – Herne-Wanne-Eickel – Duisburg	60 min
RB 33; Rhein-Niers-Bahn	Essen – Duisburg – Krefeld – Mönchengladbach – Aachen	60 min
RB 35; Emscher-Niederrhein-Bahn	Gelsenkirchen – Oberhausen – Duisburg – Krefeld – Mönchengladbach	60 min
S1	Dortmund (1) – Bochum – Essen (2) – Mülheim – Duisburg – Düsseldorf Airport – Düsseldorf Hbf (3) – Hilden – Solingen Hbf (4)	15 min (1–2), 30 min (2–3), 20 min (3–4)

== See also ==
- Rail transport in Germany
- Railway stations in Germany
