= Duisburg-Entenfang station =

Railway station in Duisburg, Germany

Coordinates: 51.3769°N 6.8137°E

Duisburg Entenfang
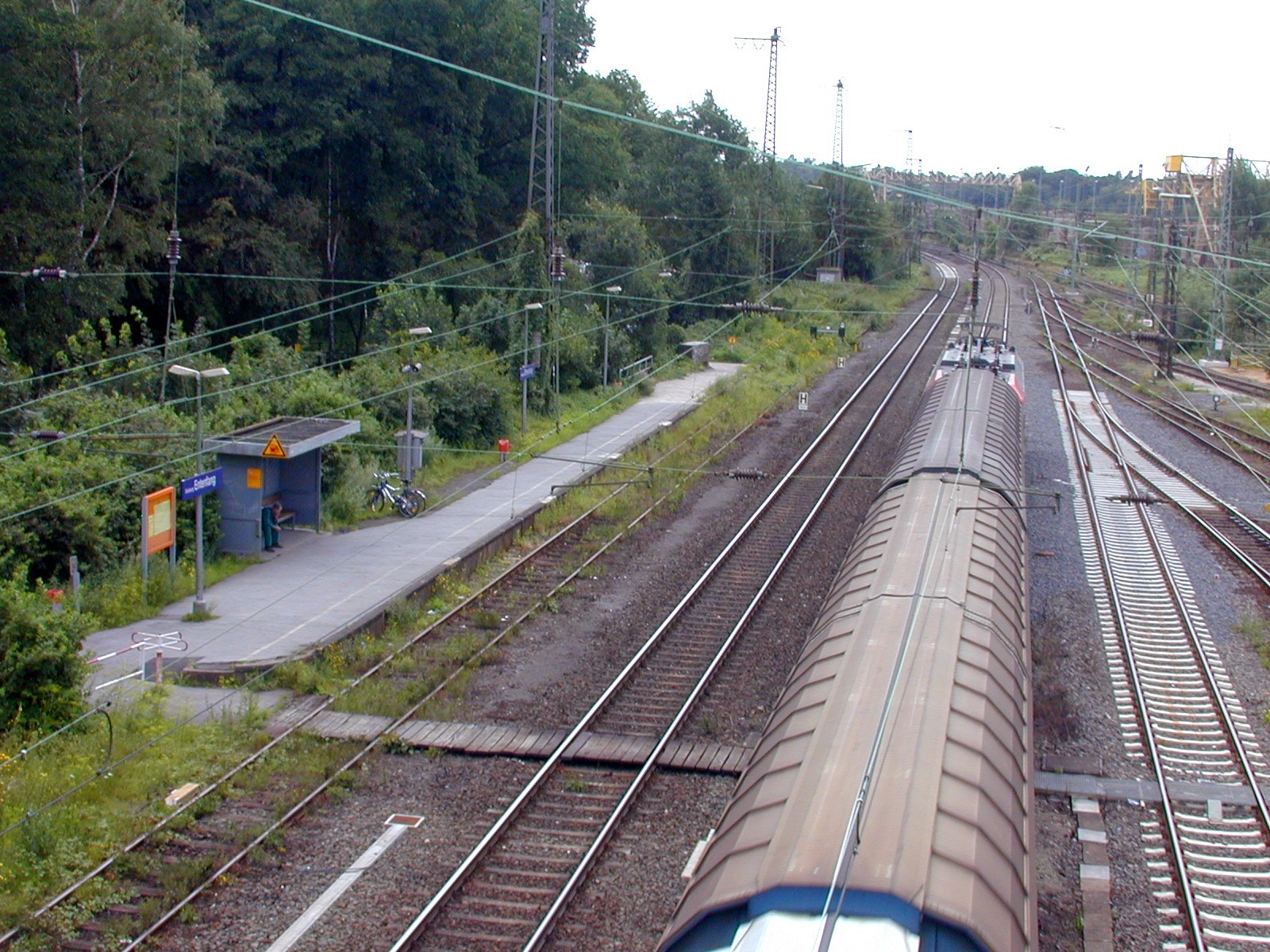

General information
- Location: Duisburg, NRW; Germany
- Owner: DB Netz
- Line: Troisdorf–Mülheim-Speldorf railway
- Platforms: 1

Other information
- Station code: 1388
- DS100 code: EDEF
- IBNR: 8005272
- Website: www.bahnhof.de

History
- Opened: 1982
- Closed: 15 December 2019
Location
- Location within North Rhine-Westphalia

Duisburg-Entenfang is a railway station in southern Duisburg, Germany.

The station was opened in 1982 and closed on 15 December 2019.

The station lies on the eastern side of the freight sidings on the freight-only line to Düsseldorf. It is situated next to a small lake, after which the station is named. The single track ends in a buffer stop just a few metres shy of the platform end. Passenger access to the other side of the freight yard was provided by a dirt track leading to a bridge overpass. Rail services have been replaced by a bus service.
