= Duisburg Stadtbahn =

Railway network

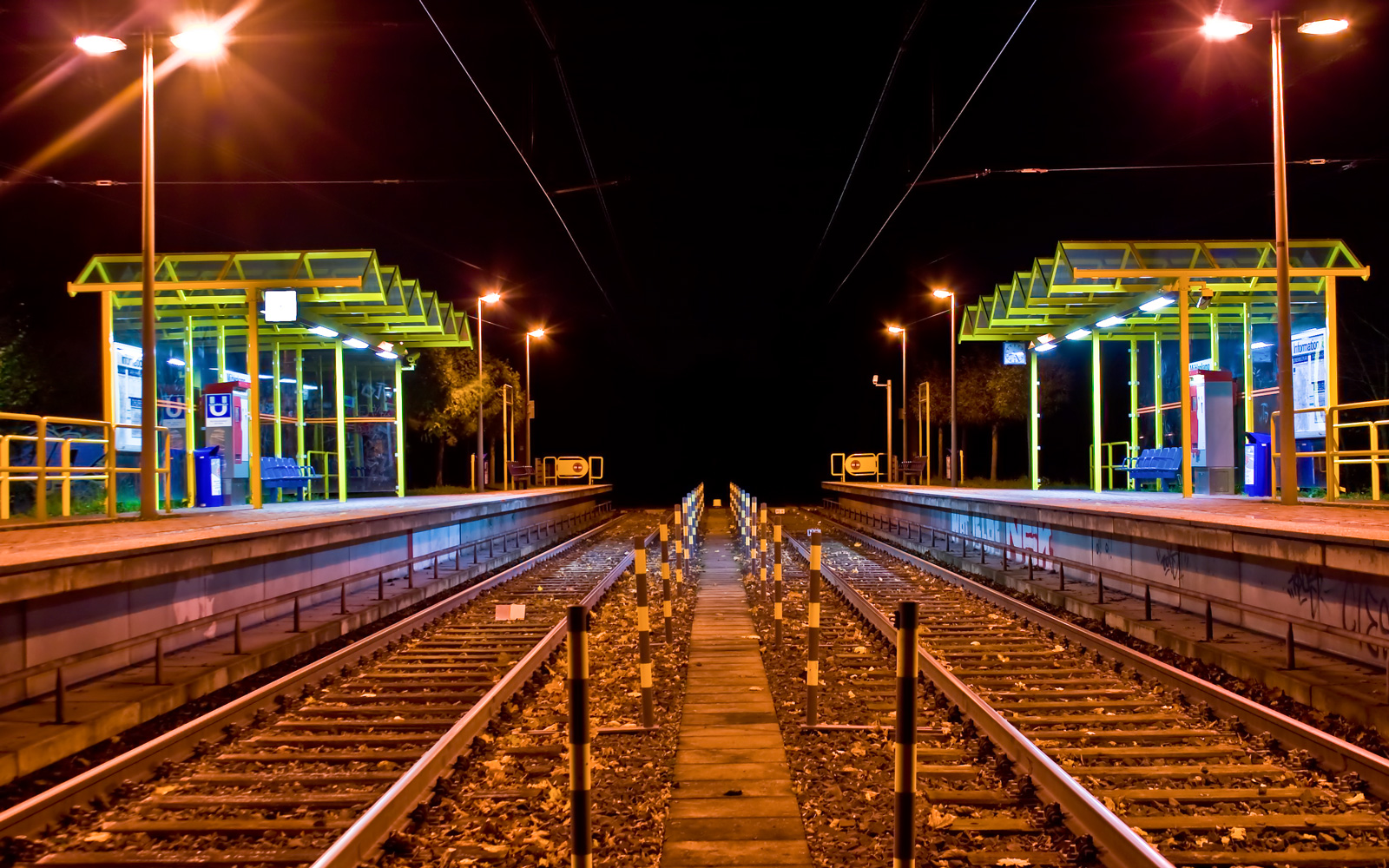
- Muehlenkamp Stadtbahn station at night.

Overview
- Locale: Duisburg and Düsseldorf, North Rhine-Westphalia, Germany
- Transit type: Light rail (Stadtbahn) and tramway
- Number of lines: 3
- Website: Duisburger Verkehrsgesellschaft (in German)

Operation
- Operator: Duisburger Verkehrsgesellschaft (DVG)

Technical
- Track gauge: 1,435 mm (4 ft 8 1/2 in)
System map
Duisburg Stadtbahn network (2013) showing underground sections in blue and other sections in red.

The Duisburg Stadtbahn is a light rail (German: Stadtbahn) network forming part of the larger Rhine-Ruhr Stadtbahn system. It is the centrepiece of the public transport system in Duisburg, Germany.

The system is operated by the Duisburger Verkehrsgesellschaft (DVG), and integrated in the Verkehrsverbund Rhein-Ruhr (VRR).

== Lines ==
Line	Tracks
U79	Meiderich Süd Bf – Duisburg Hbf – König-Heinrich-Platz – Grunewald – DU-Kesselsberg – D-Wittlaer – Kaiserswerth – Heinrich-Heine-Allee – Düsseldorf Hbf – Oberbilk S/Philipshalle – Kaiserslauterner Straße – Universität Ost/Botanischer Garten
901	Obermarxloh Schleife – Marxloh Pollmann – Beeck Denkmal – Laar Kirche – Ruhrort Bf – König-Heinrich-Platz – Duisburg Hbf – Zoo/Uni – Mülheim-Speldorf – Mülheim (Ruhr) Hbf
903	Dinslaken Bf – Du-Walsum – Marxloh Pollmann – Hamborn Rathaus – Meiderich Süd Bf – Duisburg Hbf – König-Heinrich-Platz – Hochfeld Süd Bf – Wanheimerort – Hüttenheim Schleife

== History ==
It was planned to build a light railway system for the most important lines, which crosses the city centre from west to east. This route was chosen, because it was the best way for the line from Mülheim an der Ruhr to Moers to run through Duisburg. But also for the line to Düsseldorf light railway tracks were planned. When the construction of Stadtbahn began, the route southwards to Düsseldorf was built first. And also the first tunnel, that was just 800 m long, was built on that line in 1970, so that four years later, in 1974, construction of the route could begin. However a failure was, that Angerbogen light railway station was built for 10.5 million €, but it would never open, as the new district that was planned to be built there, was not put up as big as it had to become for such a big station.

In 1992 city tunnel was opened for trams. So many lines got another route, which was not shorter and faster in every case. For example, the line to Düsseldorf now has to run westwards south of city centre before it gets in tunnel and runs eastwards back. In 2000 the tunnel was extended to Meiderich Bf..

=== Changed numbers and routes ===
That time also some numbers and routes of lines were changed:

old number	new number	changed route
79	U 79	extended to Meiderich Bf. in 2000; 2012 to Universität Ost/Botanischer Garten (Düsseldorf)
901	901	still operating as line 901; different route in Mülheim, because now it is running underground to Mülheim Hauptbahnhof
904 909	903	reduced to one line, so the lines to Huckingen and Laar are not in service any more

→ For history before construction of the Stadtbahn began, look at Trams in Duisburg.
