= Trams in Duisburg =

Tram system in Duisburg, North Rhine-Westphalia, Germany

Coordinates: 51°25′45″N 06°45′18″E

Duisburg tramway network
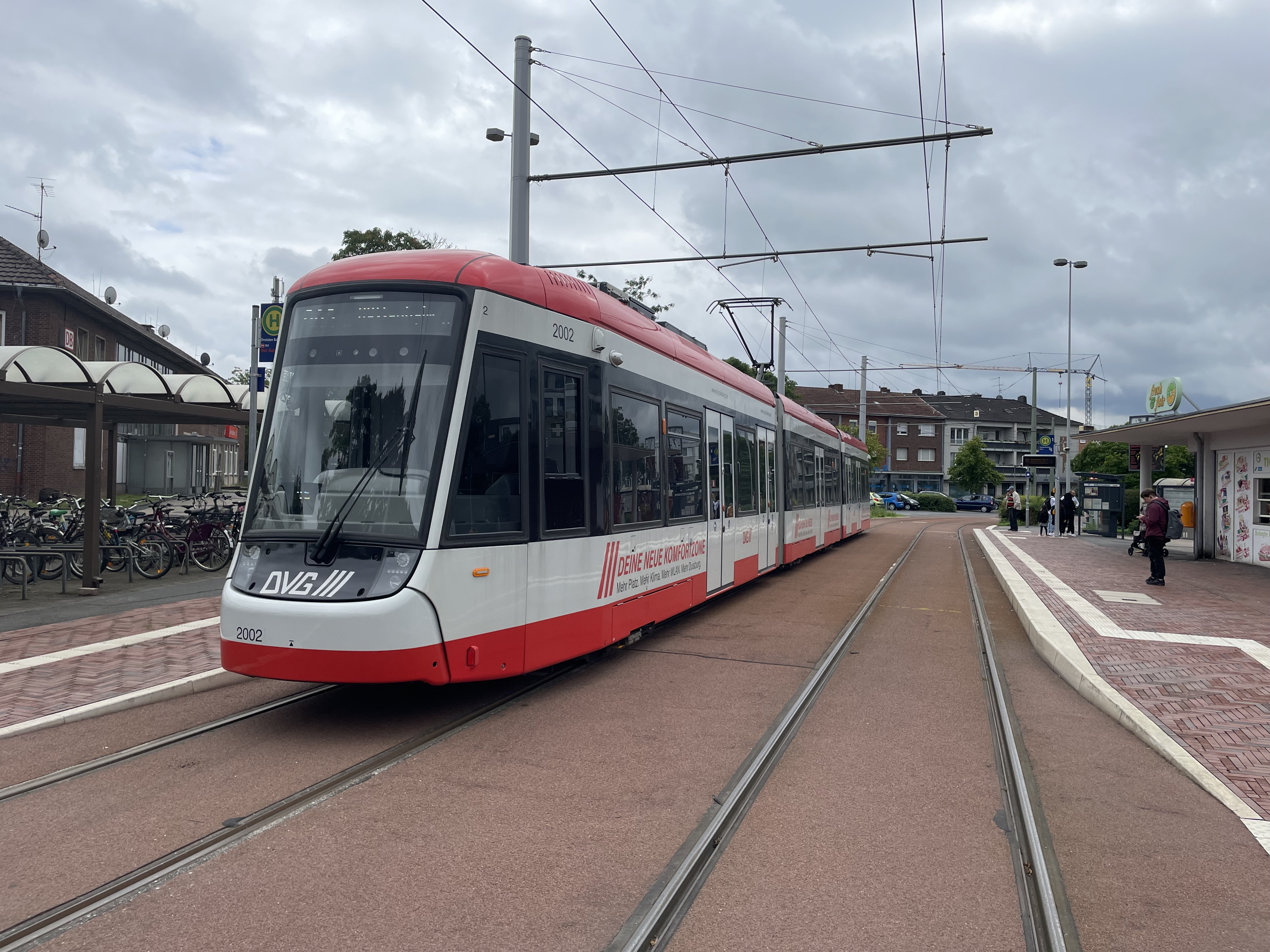
- NF4 tram at Dinslaken station, 2023

Operation
- Locale: Duisburg, Mülheim and Dinslaken, North Rhine-Westphalia, Germany

Statistics
Horsecar era: 1881–1898
- Status: Superseded
- Track gauge: 1,435 mm (4 ft 8 1/2 in) /; 750 mm (2 ft 5 1/2 in)
- Propulsion system: Horses
Steam tram era: 1882–1899
- Status: Superseded
- Track gauge: 1,000 mm (3 ft 3 3/8 in)
- Propulsion system: Steam
Electric tram era: since 1897
- Status: Operational
- Routes: 2 + 1
- Operators: Duisburger Verkehrsgesellschaft; (since 1940)
- Track gauge: 1,000 mm (3 ft 3 3/8 in) (to 1966) /; 1,435 mm (4 ft 8 1/2 in)
- Propulsion system: Electricity
- Electrification: 750 V DC
- Route length: 43.7 km (27.2 mi)
- Duisburg tramway network (dark blue: Stadtbahn Duisburg).
- Website: http://www.dvg-duisburg.de Duisburger Verkehrsgesellschaft (in German)

The Duisburg tramway network (German: Straßenbahnnetz Duisburg) is a network of tramways forming part of the public transport system in Duisburg, a city in the federal state of North Rhine-Westphalia, Germany.

Opened in 1881, the network has been operated since 1940 by the Duisburger Verkehrsgesellschaft (DVG) and is integrated into the Verkehrsverbund Rhein-Ruhr (VRR). It now forms part of the larger Duisburg Stadtbahn system, which in turn makes up part of the Rhine-Ruhr Stadtbahn system.

== Lines ==
As of 2013, the Duisburg tramway network had the following lines:

Line	Route	Travel time	Stops	Headway (rush hour)
901	Obermarxloh Schleife – Marxloh Pollmann – Beeck Denkmal – Laar Kirche – Scholtenhofstraße – Ruhrort Friedrichsplatz – Kaßlerfeld – König-Heinrich-Platz – Duisburg Hbf – Zoo/Uni – MH-Speldorf – MH Stadtmitte – Mülheim Hbf	64 min	46	7.5 / 15 min
903	Dinslaken Bf – Walsum Watereck – Marxloh Pollmann – Hamborn Rathaus – Meiderich Süd Bf – Duissern – Duisburg Hbf – König-Heinrich-Platz – Platanenhof – Hochfeld Süd Bf – Wanheim Rheintörchenstraße – Hüttenheim Mannesmann Tor 2	69 min	45	7.5 / 15 min
Line sections with longer headways in italics
Line 902 operates only during events at the Schauinsland-Reisen-Arena; the number 902 is also used to designate trams travelling to and from the Grunewald depot.
(902)	(Walsum Watereck – Marxloh Pollmann – Hamborn Rathaus – Meiderich Süd Bf – Duissern – Duisburg Hbf – König-Heinrich-Platz – Platanenhof – Grunewald Betriebshof)			

== Rolling stock ==
43 type GT10NC-DU trams are operated in Duisburg, which were built by Duewag from 1986 until 1993. The first of 47 new Bombardier Flexity trams was delivered in 2020, which are scheduled to replace the old trams.

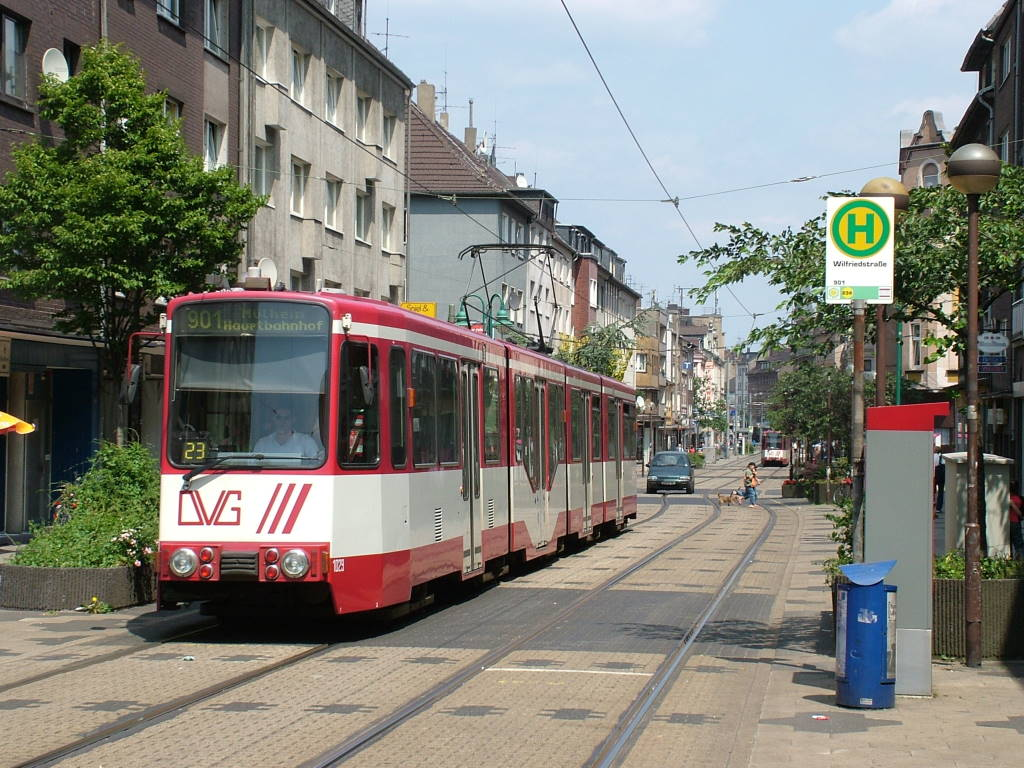
GT10NC-DU tram in Duisburg-Marxloh, 2005.

== See also ==
- List of town tramway systems in Germany
- Trams in Germany
