= Cologne–Aachen high-speed railway =

German part of the high-speed line Paris–Brussels–Cologne

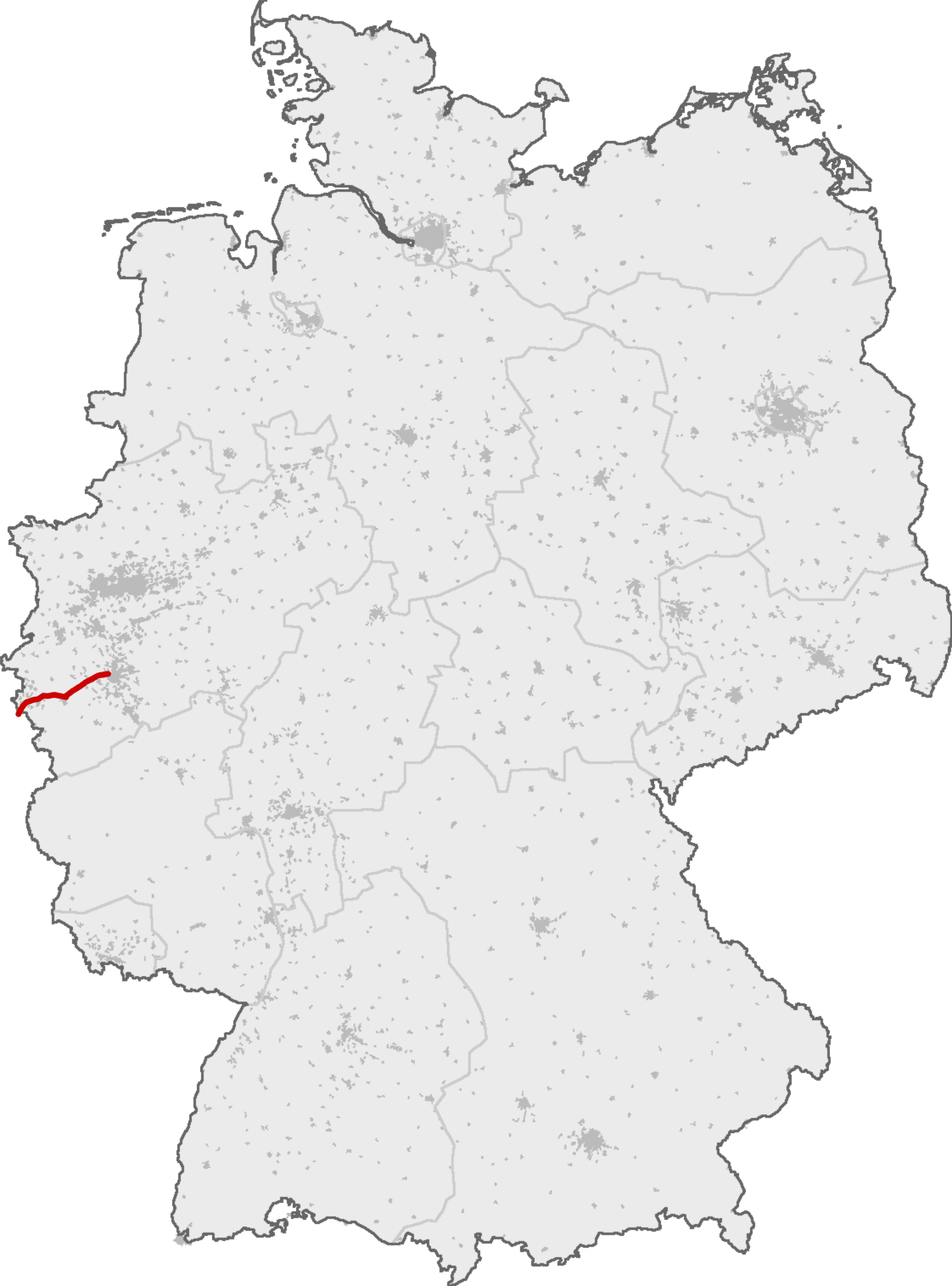
- Course of the Cologne-Aachen upgraded line

Overview
- Native name: Schnellfahrstrecke Köln–Aachen
- Line number: 2600 (Cologne–Aachen); 2622 (Cologne–Düren)
- Locale: North Rhine-Westphalia, Germany

Service
- Route number: 480

Technical
- Line length: 70 km (43 mi)
- Track gauge: 1,435 mm (4 ft 8 1/2 in) standard gauge
- Electrification: 15 kV/16.7 Hz AC overhead catenary
- Operating speed: 250 km/h (155 mph)

The Cologne–Aachen high-speed line is the German part of the Trans-European transport networks project high-speed line Paris–Brussels–Cologne. It is not a newly built railway line, but a project to upgrade the existing railway line which was opened in 1841 by the Rhenish Railway Company. When it was continued into Belgium in 1843, it became the world's first international railway line.

The line inside Germany has a length of about 70 kilometres (43 mi). The first 40 km (25 mi) from Cologne to Düren have been rebuilt. Since 2002 the line allows for speeds up to 250 km/h (155 mph). Separate tracks have been built parallel to the high-speed tracks for local S-Bahn traffic. The remaining line from Düren to Aachen allows speeds up to 160 km/h (100 mph) with some slower sections. Upgrades of Düren–Aachen are planned for the near future. In Belgium, the high-speed line is continued as HSL 3.

Regional-Express services on the line are RE 1 (NRW-Express) and RE 9 (Rhein-Sieg-Express) with National Express/RRX Desiro HC units, and push-pull trains with six double-decker carriages or Talent 2 units respectively. Long-distance trains are operated by Eurostar between Paris and Cologne and ICE 3 Neo trains between Frankfurt and Brussels roughly half-hourly, plus occasional other ICE, Intercity and Flixtrain services.

== History ==
Plans for the construction of a railway between Cologne and the Belgian border began in December 1833 with the issue of concession to the Cologne Railway Committee, which was to develop a line under the direction of Cologne Lord Mayor Johann Adolph Steinberger and the entrepreneur Ludolf Camphausen. The Cologne Railway Committee presented a draft route that would bypass Aachen to reduce costs: the line would run from Eschweiler to Kornelimünster along the Inde and from there to the Belgian border. Düren would also not have been connected to the railway. The Aachen merchants resisted this proposal and they founded the Aachen Railway Committee under the direction of David Hansemann and Philipp Heinrich Pastor. This was the beginning of the so-called Eisenbahnstreites zwischen Köln und Aachen (railway dispute between Cologne and Aachen). In October, the Aachen Railway Committee presented an alternative proposal for the route that ran from Cologne via Düren and Aachen to the Belgian border.

On 6 April 1836, a conference of representatives of the traders of Aachen and Cologne in Jülich, chaired by the Oberpräsident of the Rhine Province Ernst von Bodelschwingh, could not resolve to the railway dispute. Hansemann and the Aachen cloth manufacturer Joseph van Gülpen then travelled to Berlin and lodged an application for a line running through Aachen. In Berlin, lengthy negotiations took place between representatives of Aachen and Cologne. Prussian king Frederick William III decided on 12 February 1837 that the line would run through Aachen and thus ended the railway dispute.

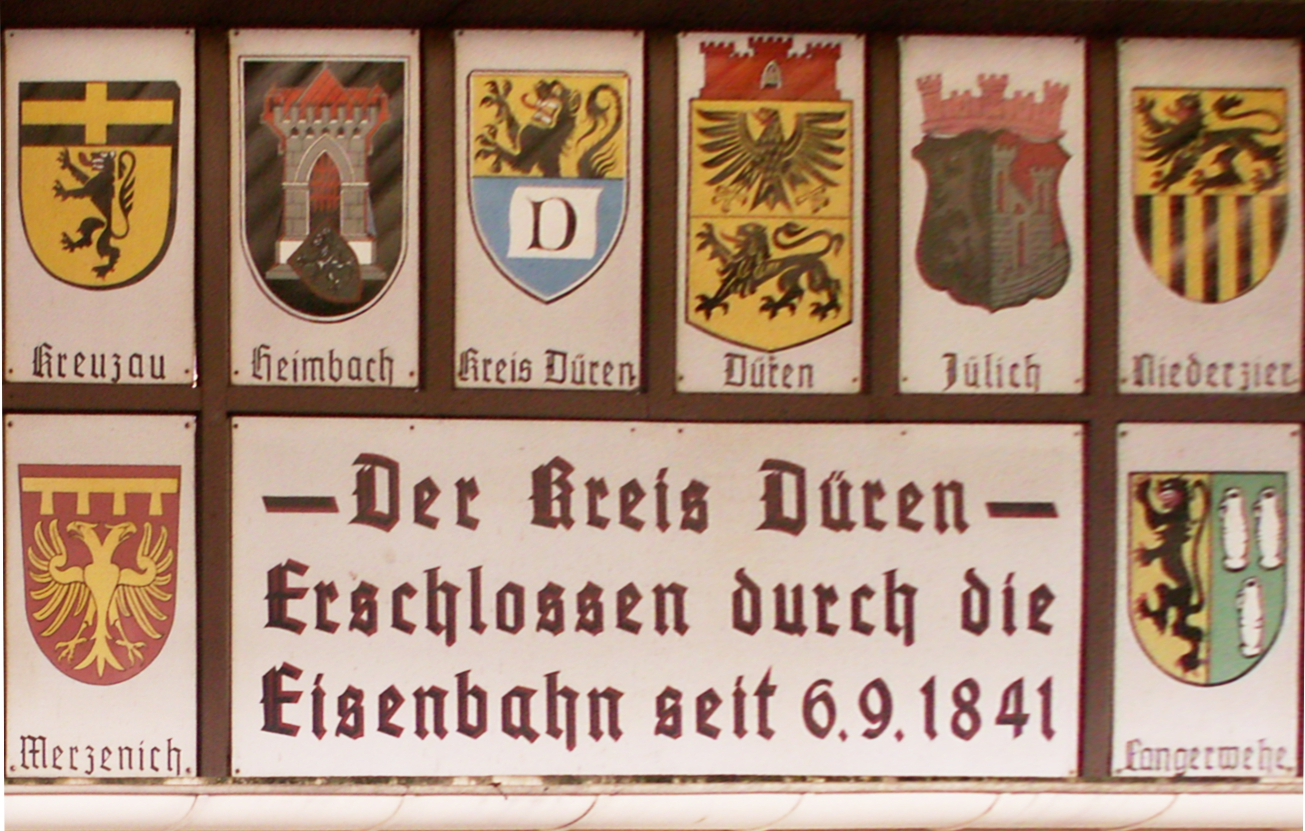
Information board at the opening of the line from Cologne to Aachen in Düren

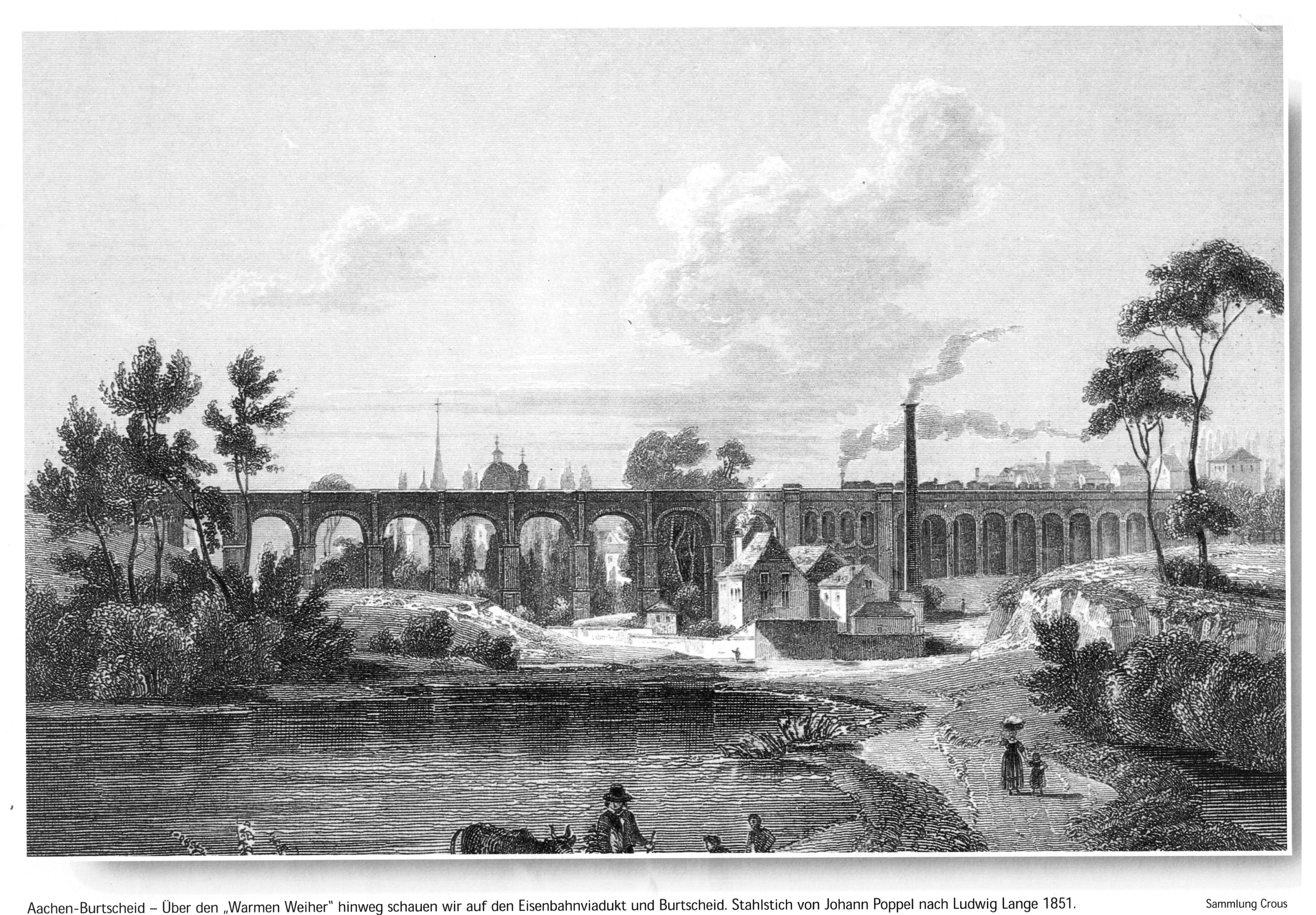
Burtscheider Viaduct

In June 1837, the Aachen and Cologne representatives agreed to the merger of the two committees of their cities and founded the Rhenish Railway Company (Rheinische Eisenbahn-Gesellschaft), which received a concession to build the line from Cologne to the Belgian border in Herbesthal. Construction of the line began on 11 April 1838.

The proposal to develop a direct line from Düren to Aachen was discarded due to the geological conditions of the northern Eifel and a curve to the north was adopted between Düren and Aachen that is still used by the line. The share capital of 9 million marks was raised to enable the Rhenish Railway to build the line by the issuing of shares. But due to the difficult route, construction costs increased to 21 million marks. The additional costs of 12 million marks were raised by issuing additional shares worth 4.5 million marks and bonds worth 7.5 million marks. The Belgian government alone acquired bonds for 3 million marks.

The first section from Cologne to Müngersdorf was opened on 2 August 1839, less than four years after the Nuremberg–Fürth railway, the first German railway, and was the seventh railway on German territory. To this end, open and closed carriages and wagons were delivered by Waggonfabrik Talbot of Aachen using road transport at the beginning of the year. Another section from Müngersdorf to Lövenich was opened on 2 July 1840. The last section from Lövenich to Aachen was opened on 1 September 1841 with an inaugural trip from Cologne to Aachen and back, during which a banquet for 360 invited guests was held. Regular passenger services on the whole route commenced on 6 September 1841. A panel on the east side of Düren station still marks this event.

With the connection of the line from Belgium, a special train ran from Antwerp to Cologne on 15 October 1843. This made the line between Cologne and Aachen part of the world's first cross-border railway. The Belgian railways were connected to the French railway network in 1845, so the Cologne-Aachen line handled traffic to and from France.

=== Operations until the First World War ===
Initially, the line was single-track and the timetable was set up so that trains leaving from Aachen and Cologne crossed at the multi-track Düren station. After the line on the Belgian side had been duplicated, the Rhenish Railway Company decided to duplicate the entire line in 1844. According to a report by Gustav von Mevissen, the president of the Rhenish Railway Company on 20 May 1845, the volume of traffic on the line between Cologne and Aachen exceeded the expectations of the planners in the early years. The passenger traffic was one of the largest in Prussia and the freight traffic was "the highest of all continental railways". Freight traffic exceeded passenger traffic in 1847. Work on the Aachen–Eschweiler section is documented as starting in 1848 and was completed in 1852. The Rhenish Railway Company covered the cost by issuing shares and taking out loans. During the German revolutions of 1848–1849, the Cologne–Aachen railway was used for occasional arms shipments.

Numerous factories were soon established along the line and coal mining was also important from the start. The Eschweiler Mining Association (Eschweiler Bergwerks-Verein) established coal storage at the stations of Aachen, Düren and Cologne immediately after the opening of a coal loading track. As a result of the opening of the line, the EBV's transport costs fell by two-thirds and contracts were also concluded with the Rhenish Railway Company for coal deliveries to supply its steam locomotives. Every second freight train on the Cologne–Aachen line transported coal from the Aachen coalfield in 1847. The coal from the individual mines was originally carried to the railway line by horsecars on field railway tracks, but were increasingly replaced by standard gauge steam trains. The Reserve colliery (Grube Reserve) was connected to the railway line between Eschweiler Hauptbahnhof and Nothberg in 1865 and the Mariagrube-Stolberg railway was opened in 1870.

=== First World War and the Occupation ===
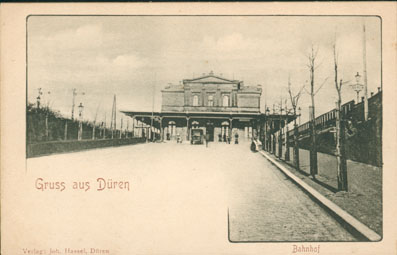
Düren station in 1920

The Cologne–Aachen railway also became increasingly strategic for military traffic to Belgium and for connecting the strategically important Vennbahn. Numerous improvements were carried out from 1912 to 1914 to improve the performance of the line, including the upgrade of tracks and the establishment of an overtaking loop in Derichsweiler. Quadruplication between Langerwehe and Nothberg was planned in 1914, but this was prevented by the outbreak of the First World War. During the war, the railway was used to transport troops and supplies to the western front. After the German declaration of war on France on 3 August 1914, the line was closed to civilian traffic and only used for the transport of troops. Regular traffic resumed in mid-September. The marshalling yard in Düren was extended for military reasons as late as 1917.

After the First World War, the Cologne–Aachen railway was located in the French occupation zone. France intended to transport raw materials via this line from the Ruhr, which was also occupied, but the German railway workers refused to work with them as passive resistance. During the occupation, the line was blocked to regular traffic several times so that French crews could operate coal trains from the Ruhr to France without having to observe German signalling and rail regulations. Occasional acts of sabotage to prevent these operations were mostly unsuccessful. The line was returned to German control with the end of the occupation of the Rhineland.

The Buir rail accident occurred between Düren and Horrem on 25 August 1929, resulting in 14 dead and 43 people injured. Due to construction work, trains towards Cologne had to be diverted on the wrong line and the affected points should have been operated at 50 km/h (30 mph). Due to a mistake on the part of the dispatcher, the Paris–Warsaw express ran over these points at full speed and derailed.

=== Second World War ===
The Cologne–Aachen railway was used for military purposes again during the Battle of France. Trains carrying troops and war equipment ran over the line. During the war, the line was a frequent target of air raids, causing damage particularly in Aachen and Cologne. The last through train from Aachen to Cologne ran on 12 September 1944. A refugee train from Eschweiler was strafed on 15 September 1944. The locomotive of a passenger train occupied by about 200 was attacked, so it stopped at Hücheln near Langerwehe. Subsequently, a train formed of locked freight wagons was attacked with bombs and gunfire. About 80 people died in the process. Rail traffic from Eschweiler was discontinued on that day. Rail traffic from Düren was discontinued after the air raid on Düren on 16 November 1944. When German troops withdrew, they blew up bridges, such as parts of the Burtscheid Viaduct and the Three Arch Bridge (Dreibogenbrücke).

=== Postwar period ===
After the withdrawal of German troops, Allied troops gradually took over the towns along the line and restored operations, initially on one track. The first passenger trains ran from Aachen to Düren on 10 September 1945. A bus service between Düren and Cologne was temporarily established in January 1946. Operations were resumed on the whole line on 15 May 1946. Immediately after the line was restored to traffic, the volume of traffic was very high. On the one hand, there was a lack of alternative means of transport, such as trucks and private cars, on the other hand the number of passengers rose due to the return of soldiers, Heimatvertriebene ("homeland expellees") and Hamsterfahrten ("hamster trips", that is travel by townspeople to the countryside to barter for food). It was announced on 18 November 1947 that services would be severely limited due to a coal shortage.

The most significant single structure of this line was the 1,623 metres (5,325 ft)-long Königsdorf Tunnel, which was demolished in 1954. A serious railway accident occurred in the resulting cutting on 27 May 1983 when an express crashed into a landslide at a speed of 130 km/h (80 mph) after heavy rainfall. Seven people died and 23 were injured. The cutting at Königsdorf was widened for the quadruplication of the line in 2000.

After the electrification of the federal German network reached Cologne from the south in the late 1950s, the Cologne–Aachen route was also electrified. This involved the conversion of several tunnels into cuttings. Due to the different power system of the Belgian State Railways, Aachen Hauptbahnhof was upgraded to become a system change station, the first (and for 42 years the only place) where the German and Belgian rail electrification systems met directly. With the change of timetable in May 1966, electric train operations commenced on the Cologne–Aachen–Liège route, using the standard Belgium system (3000 V DC) from Aachen. (Liège had been accessible for electric operations from Brussels since 1955.) At that time, Belgium already had a multi-system locomotive. In the autumn of 1966, DB also received its first multi-system locomotives, which could run under both the German and Belgian electric systems, but did not prove themselves, so that ultimately only some of the international express trains were hauled with Belgian multi-system locomotives and the others still had to change locomotive in Aachen until the 1990s.

With the dual-class Intercity system of DB introduced in 1979, the line benefitted at the edges of the day: a morning IC service from Cologne to Hamburg already started in Aachen, stopping in Düren, and connected in Cologne to become part of the IC regular interval pattern. It was given the name Karolinger (after Charlemagne) and returned from Hamburg to Aachen in the evening and remained a constant in the timetable for over two decades. A real cyclical service pattern did not develop between Cologne and Aachen until 1984, when the Belgian State Railways introduced its new nationwide timetable concept, which included a service every two hours from Cologne via Aachen and Brussels to Ostend, which was operated with air-conditioned Eurofima coaches. The rest of the services operated, on the other hand, was only switched to regular intervals when the regional rail regular interval timetable was established in 1991.

=== Line upgrade ===
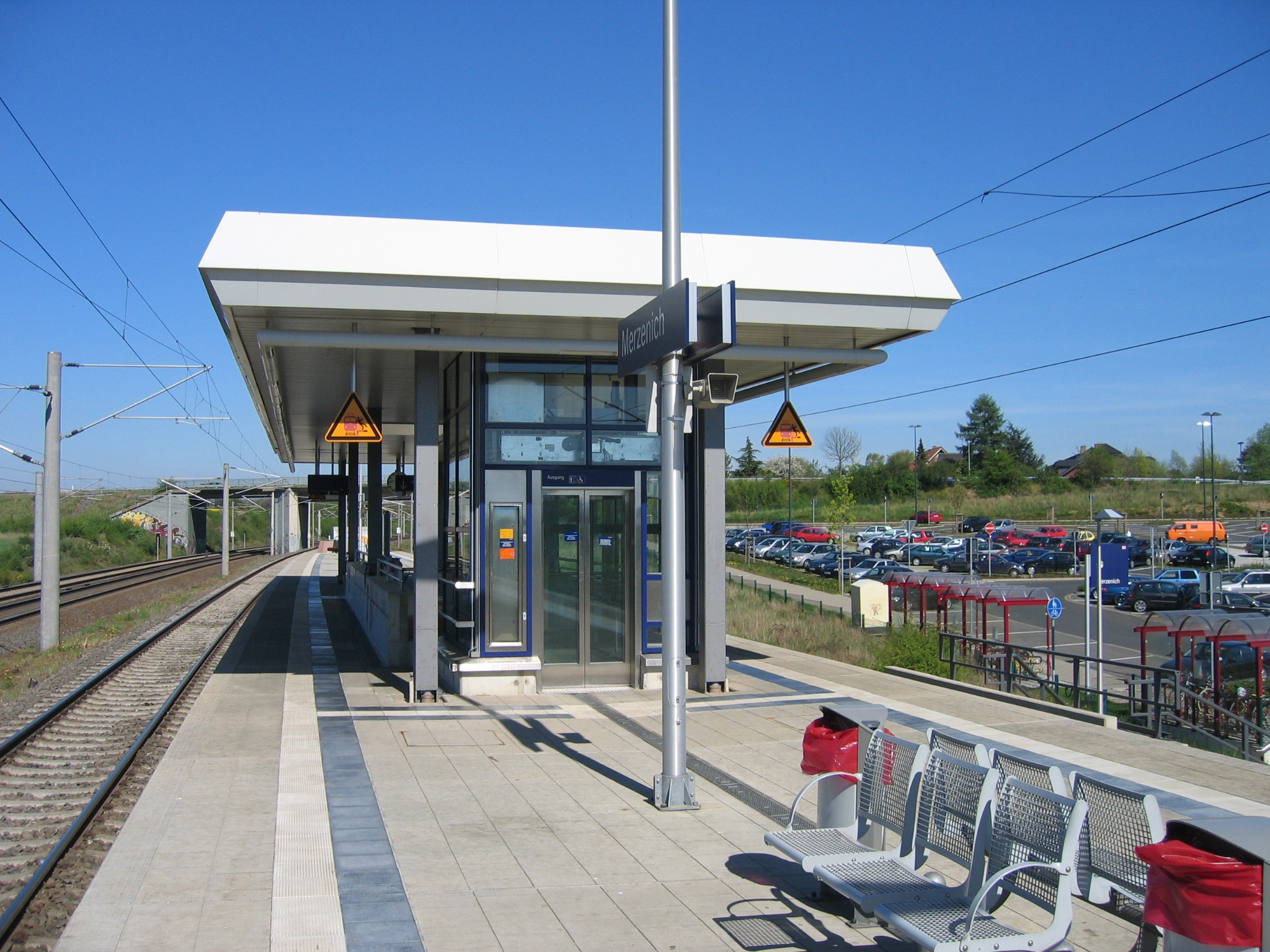
Typical S-Bahn stop in Merzenich

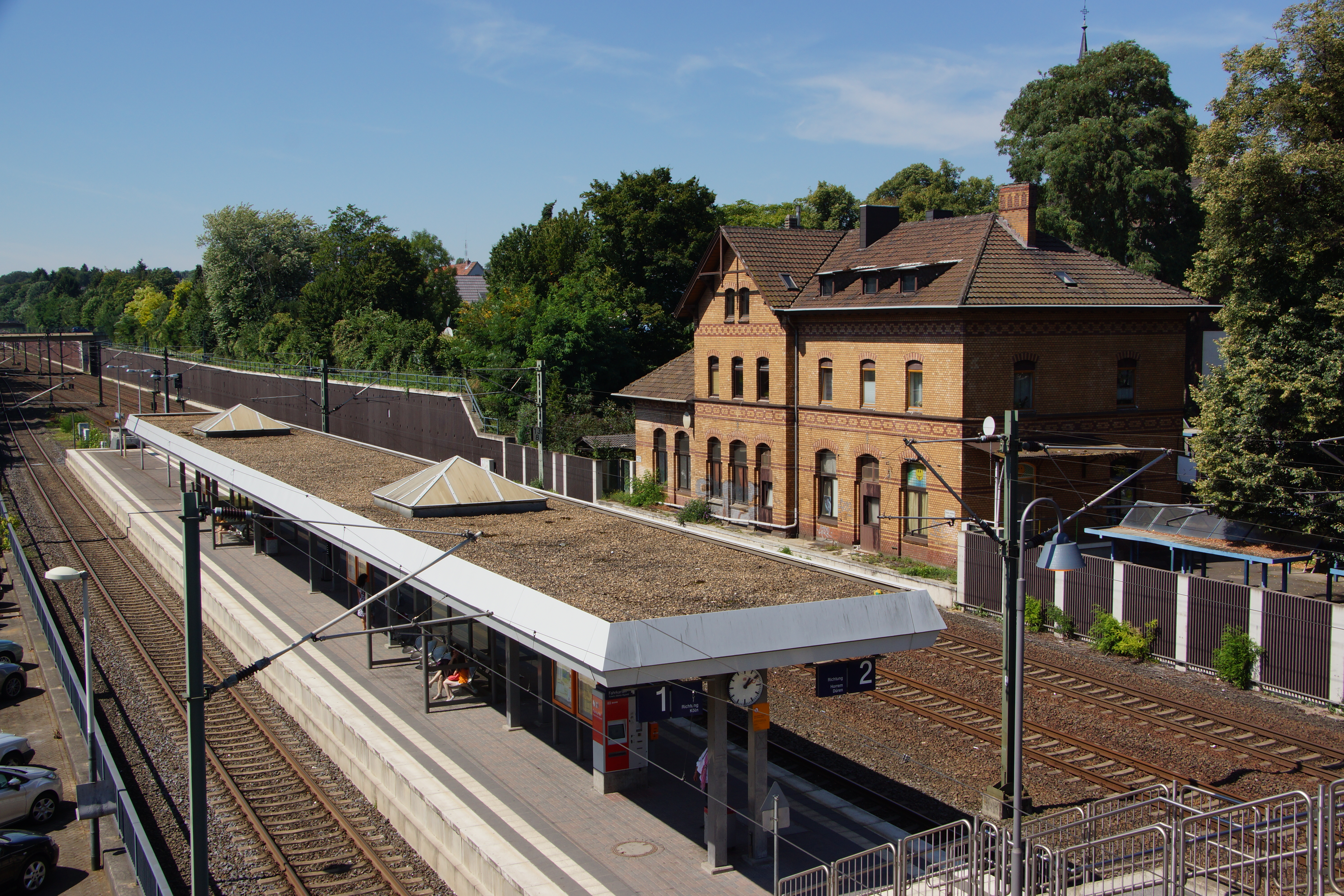
The new Frechen-Königsdorf S-Bahn station, with the old entrance building in the background

The line is to be upgraded at a total cost of €952 million (as of 2013). The first and third of three sections designated under this project have been completed. The planning approval procedure for the second section, which includes passing tracks and increased speeds, was initiated at the Federal Railway Authority in August 2014. The works are divided into six phases of construction with commissioning due in the second quarter of 2020. Preparatory work began in June 2018.

==== Planning ====
The Cologne–Aachen line was already included in the Bundesverkehrswegeplan (Federal Transport Infrastructure Plan) of 1973 as one of eight planned upgraded lines (Ausbaustrecken) in the field of railways. After the development project was not included in the Koordiniertes Investitionsprogramm für die Bundesverkehrswege (coordinated investment program) of 1977, it was listed in the Federal Transport Infrastructure Plan 1980 as a project to be completed by 1990 (stage I). The line was also included in the Federal Transport Infrastructure Plan 1985.

Planning for the upgrade between Cologne and Aachen started in 1988. In November 1989, the transport ministers of the countries involved in the PBKA project agreed on a schedule according to which the line would be completed in 1995. The project was also included in the Federal Transport Infrastructure Plan of 1992. In 1992, it was planned to complete work by 1997. Of the estimated cost of DM 1.1 billion, around DM 800 million was to be allocated to the section between Cologne and Düren, half of which would be provided by the federal government and half would be funded under the municipal transport finance law (Gemeindeverkehrsfinanzierungsgesetz). Around DM 150 million (as of 1990) would be allocated to the section west of Düren.

The upgraded line project and the construction of a new Cologne–Horrem–Düren S-Bahn line (S 12 and S 13) on its own track were planned together.

The PBKA project is a European railway project that is connecting the cities of Paris, Brussels, Cologne and Amsterdam with high-speed lines. The project is funded by the EU as part of the TEN initiative under the acronym PBKAL (Paris, Brussels, Cologne, Amsterdam, London). This line described here was to be upgraded for high-speed traffic and upgraded for around €950 million. The timing of the completion of this project is open.

==== Reconstruction measures ====
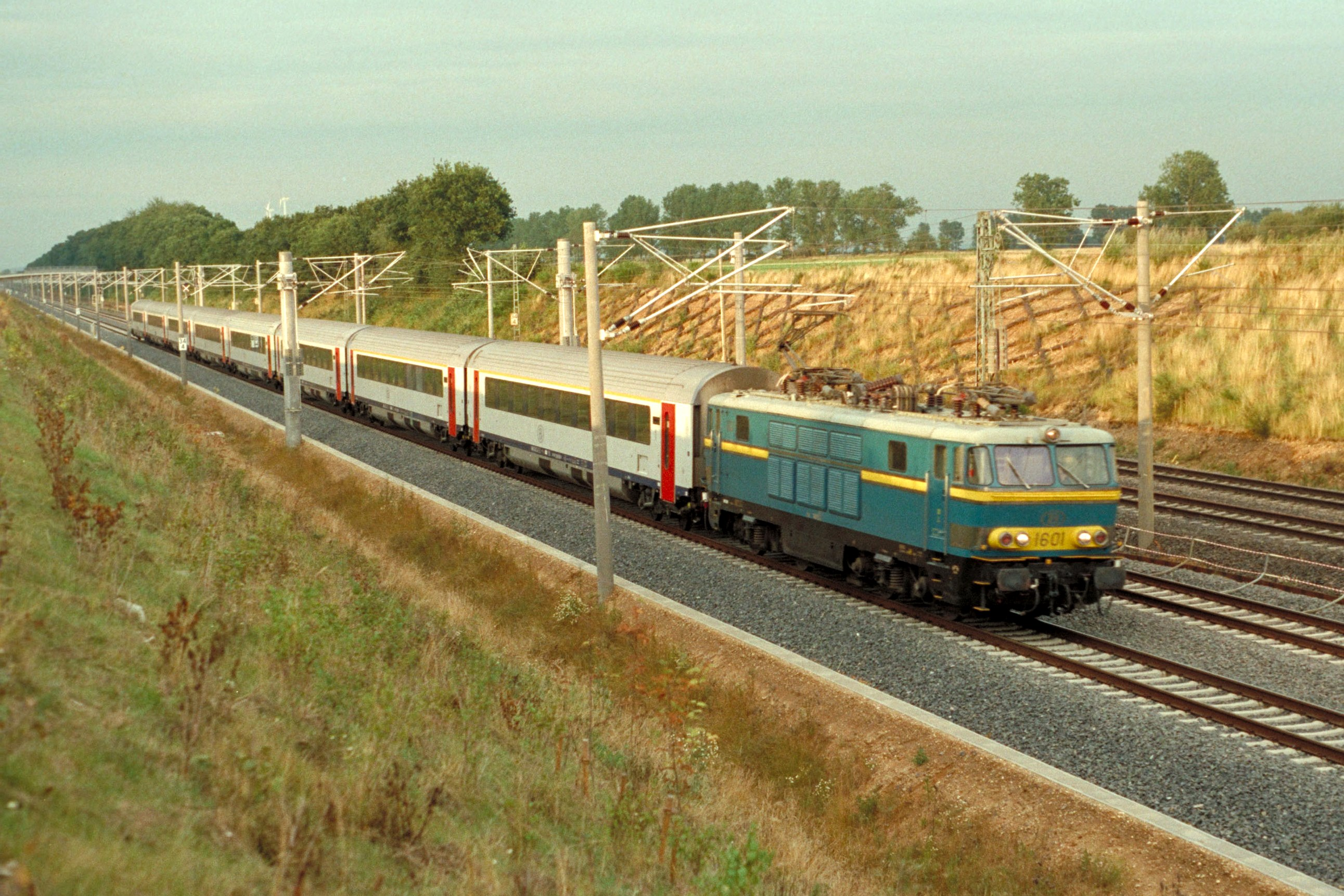
D 438 on the Cologne–Ostende route near Merzenich on 17 July 2002

The construction work began with a symbolic ramming on 22 October 1997. Among the guests of this event for the construction of section 1 (triangular junction near Cologne station) were Federal Minister of Transport Wissmann and state minister of transport Clement.

According to the then planning two new tracks would first be built between Cologne and Düren for the high-speed and the existing line would be upgraded for the S-Bahn line at a cost of DM 1.1 billion. More than 80 percent of the costs would be covered by the federal government and the rest by the state of North Rhine-Westphalia. Completion was expected in May 2002.

By the end of 2002, the existing line between Cologne and Düren had gained one or two more tracks and been upgraded to a high-speed line. Since 14 December 2003, the mainline tracks on this 42-kilometre (26 mi)-long section can be operated at up to 250 km/h (155 mph). All stations on this section of the line have been rebuilt and some of them have been converted into S-Bahn only stations.

The S-Bahn started operating at the timetable change in December 2002 on the S-Bahn tracks, which are now operationally separated from the main line. The tracks on the high-speed line are used by regional and international express train services. Until the opening of the Cologne/Bonn Airport station in mid-2004, line S13 of the Cologne S-Bahn (the southern part of the Rhine-Ruhr S-Bahn) operated to Düren, but since then line S12 has run from Au (Sieg) via Hennef, Troisdorf and Cologne to Düren. Köln-Weiden West station, which serves as a link to Cologne Stadtbahn line 1, was opened on 28 May 2006. In particular, it is intended to facilitate arrivals and departures at events in the RheinEnergieStadion. The single-track S-Bahn line was duplicated over a length of 1.6 km (0.99 mi) between Buir and Sindorf to allow the equalisation of S-Bahn frequencies between Düren and Cologne. At night, the S13 runs beyond Horrem to Aachen and back. This gives the region a better connection to Cologne/Bonn Airport.

Around 2002 the line was used by around 150 passenger and 70 freight trains per day.

In mid-2003, the ICE S reached a speed of 275 km/h (171 mph) on the newly built high-speed section as part of approval and acceptance tests.

=== Development since 2003 ===
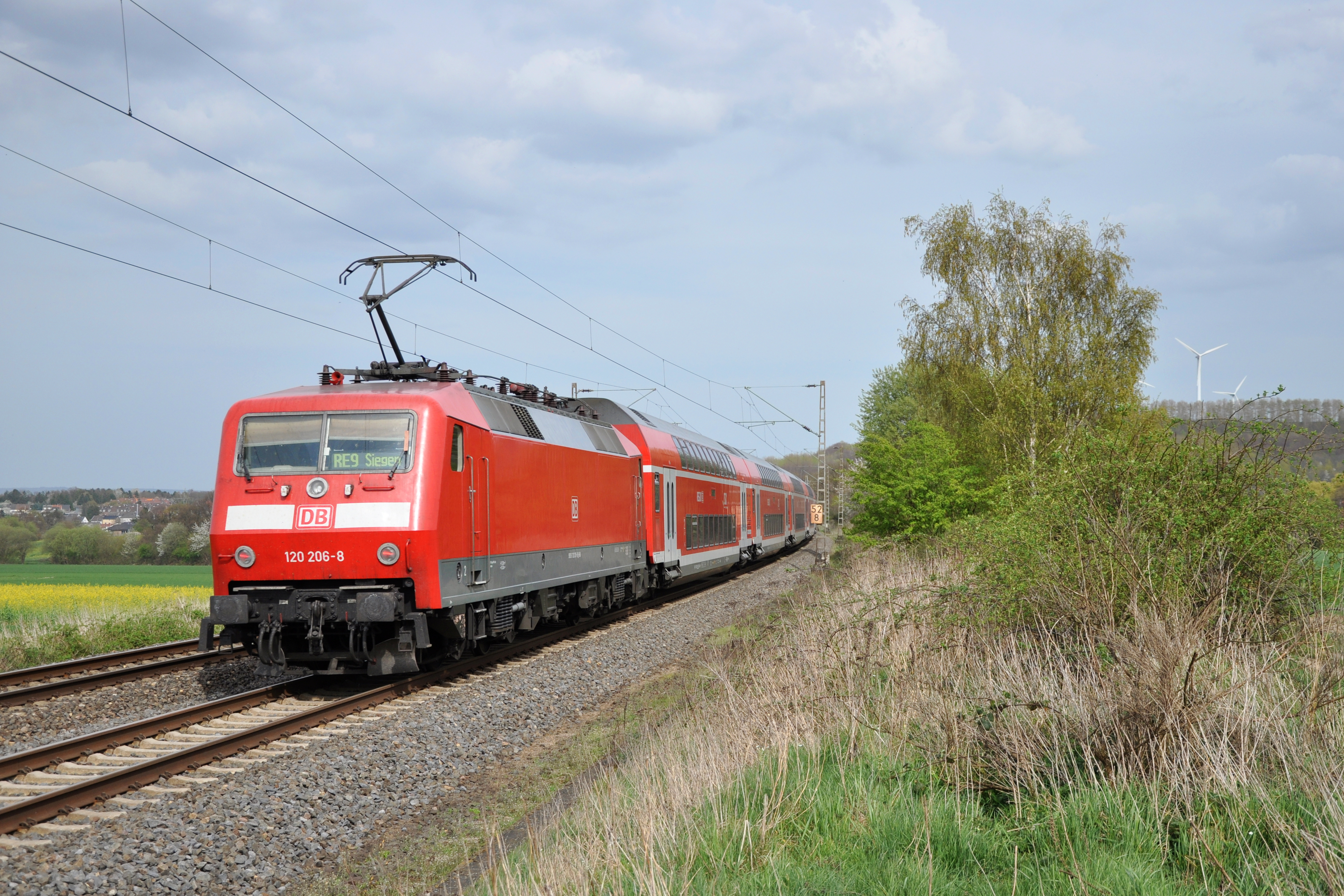
Rhein-Sieg-Express near Nothberg

The long-distance pair of tracks is designed for shared use by long-distance passenger and freight traffic from Ehrenfeld freight yard (line-kilometre 6) towards Aachen. The S-Bahn section between Cologne and Sindorf also has two tracks. Continuing towards Düren, single-track sections alternate with double-track passing sections. The entrance to Düren station (from Merzenich station) is single-track. The long-distance tracks are designed for operations at 250 km/h (155 mph) and the S-Bahn tracks for 120 km/h (75 mph). From Merzenich station east of Düren (line-kilometre 34.480), the design speed of the long-distance tracks is 220 km/h (140 mph), from line-kilometre 38.0 it is 200 km/h (125 mph) and from line-kilometre 39.6 it is 160 km/h (100 mph). The S-Bahn was designed for a 20-minute cycle (during peak hour) with the possibility of shorter cycles. 53 S-Bahn trips per day and direction were planned. Regional trains running on the long-distance tracks between Cologne and Düren still stop in Horrem and Cologne-Ehrenfeld. No plans were made to run the S 6 to Horrem and thus create a ten-minute cycle between Horrem and Cologne.

In a second construction phase, the section between Düren and Langerwehe is to be upgraded for speeds of up to 200 km/h (125 mph). The subsequent section via Eschweiler to Aachen is to be upgraded for 140 km/h (90 mph). Currently, speeds of up to 120 km/h (75 mph) are possible between Eschweiler and Stolberg, although sometimes only up to 110 km/h (70 mph). Top speeds of 140 or 160 km/h (90 or 100 mph) are already permitted on the rest of the line. It should be possible for trains to pass through Düren station at 200 km/h (125 mph) after completion of the second stage of construction. In the final state, it should be possible to run at a minimum of 200 km/h (125 mph) over an almost 50 km (31 mi)-long section between Cologne and Langerwehe.

The investment framework plan for federal transport infrastructure of 2010 (Investitionsrahmenplan bis 2010 für die Verkehrsinfrastruktur des Bundes) specified total costs of €951.7 million (as of 2006) for new construction and upgrading between Cologne and the German-Belgian border (including the Busch Tunnel). €769.8 million of this was spent up to 2005. Federal funds totaling €88.9 million were invested between 2006 and 2010. Beyond this period, there is a need for finance of €93.0 million (federal funds from 2011, own funds of Deutsche Bahn and contributions from third parties from 2006).

In November 2008, additional investments in the Aachen–Stolberg–Eschweiler section were approved as part of an economic stimulus package. It was planned that the Aachen-Rothe Erde–Stolberg section would be partially upgraded to three tracks from 2010. This project has not yet been implemented. Only the Aachen-Rothe Erde station has been modernised. Due to the construction delay, the European Commission cut funding for the project by €2.9 million at the end of 2010. In June 2010, EVS Euregio Verkehrsschienennetz (EVS) acquired Stolberger Hauptbahnhof including the entrance building. Only the dispatcher signal box and the mainline through tracks remained the property of Deutsche Bahn. The EVS started the reconstruction of Stolberg Hauptbahnhof in 2012 and the height of the main platform was increased to 760 millimetres.

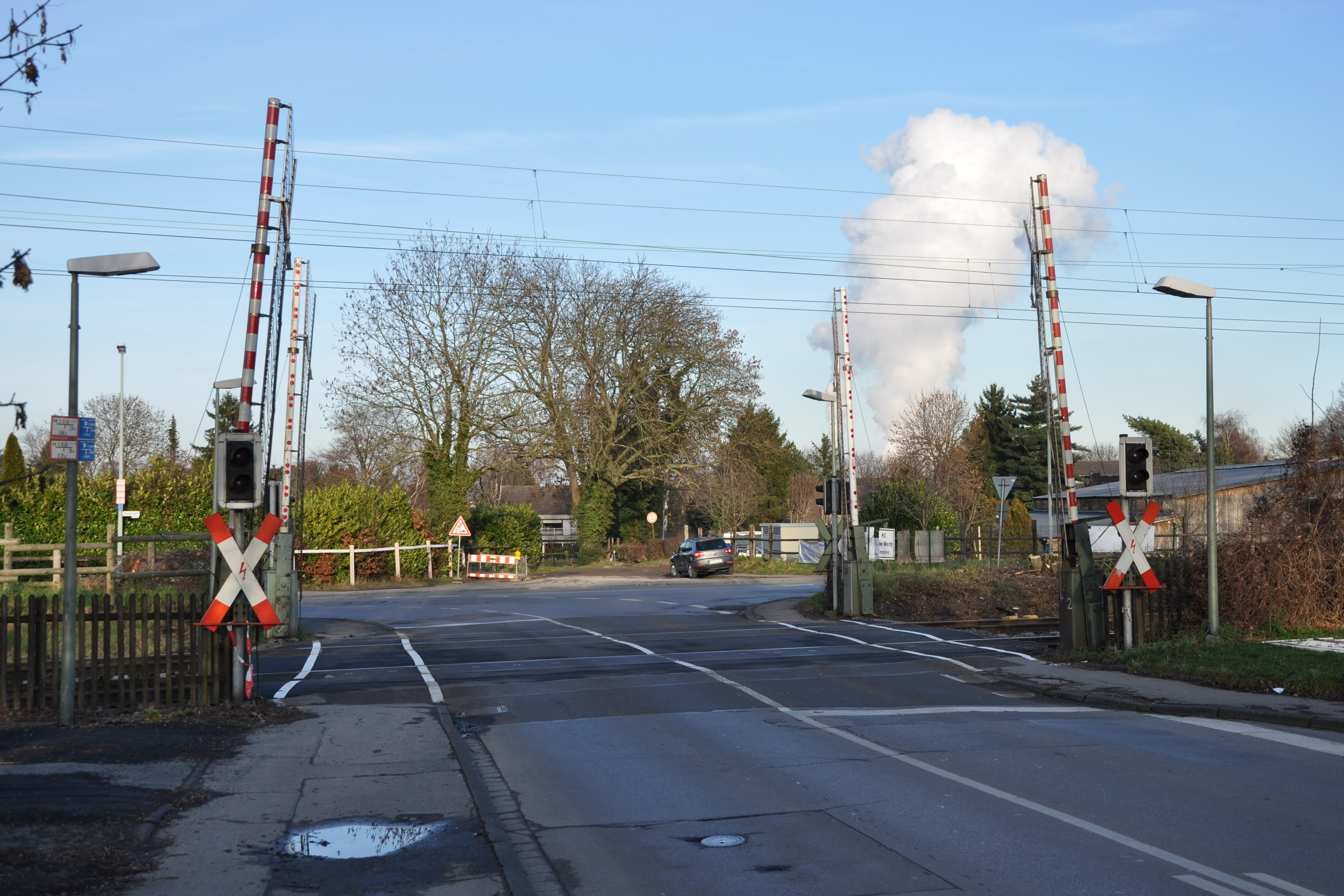
The last remaining level crossing is at Jägerspfad in Eschweiler

In 2017, Deutsche Bahn began construction work on the island platform on the mainline through tracks at Stolberger Hauptbahnhof. The existing underpass is to be replaced by an overpass with lifts. The work was expected to take until the middle of 2019. Construction work on the Upgraded line 4, II. upgrade phase, 1. construction stage project at Eschweiler Hauptbahnhof began in 2018. Platforms at the Hauptbahnhof have been raised to 76 cm (30 in) and barrier-free access has been created to the island platform via lifts and the two passing tracks (platform 1 and 4) have been extended to a useful length of 750 m (2,460 ft). The relay interlocking has been replaced by connecting the station to a computer-based interlocking and the last level crossing between Cologne and Aachen at Jägerspfad in Eschweiler is to be closed. Work in Aachen should also begin in 2019. In the district of Eilendorf, the third track is to be extended by about 1,700 metres (5,600 ft) between Eilendorf and the former Aachen-Rothe Erde freight yard. Measures for noise and vibration protection are also planned.

The line between Stolberg Hauptbahnhof and Aachen Hauptbahnhof was declared an overloaded railway on 11 November 2019.

In the second half of 2029, the Cologne–Aachen route will be completely closed for approximately five months as part of a general renovation.

== Route description ==
=== Cologne Hauptbahnhof ===
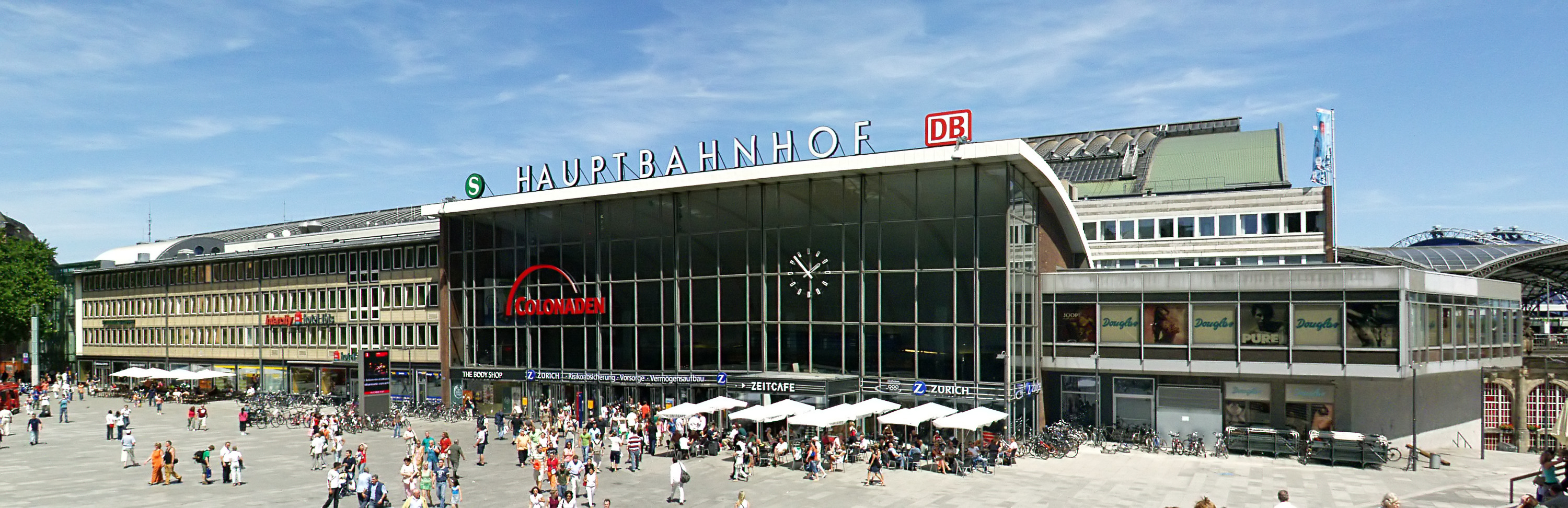
Entrance building of Cologne Hauptbahnhof

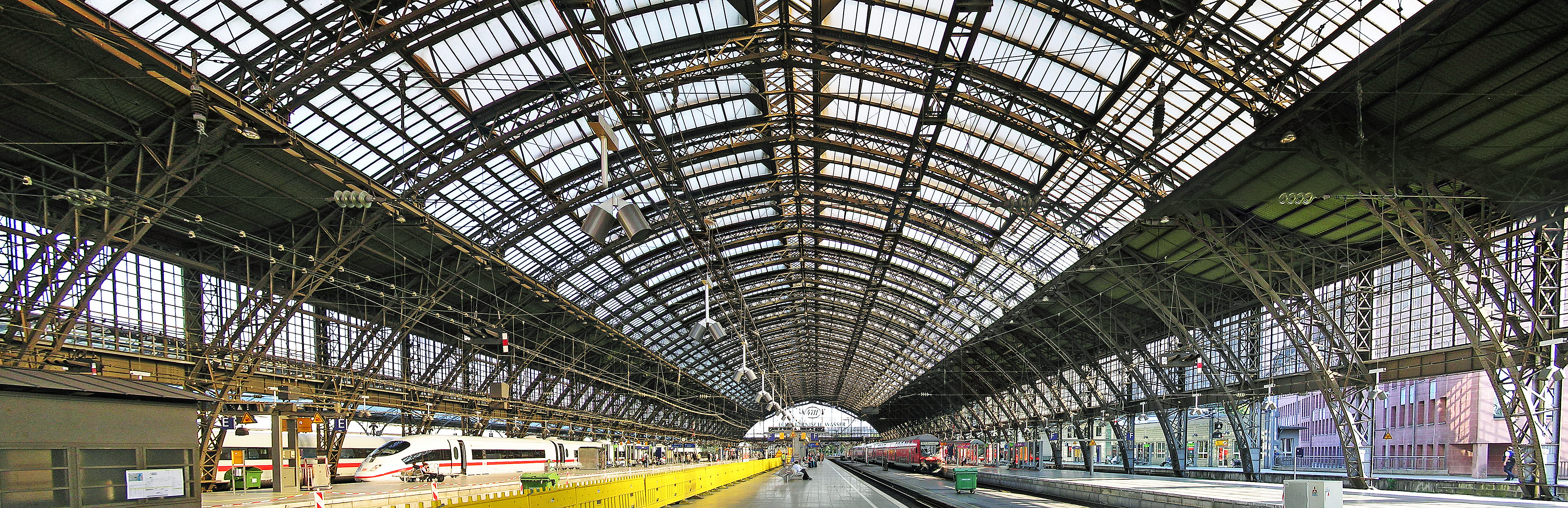
Train shed

The original starting point of the Cologne–Aachen railway was a terminal station of the Rhenish Railway Company (Rheinische Eisenbahn). When the Cathedral Bridge made it possible for trains to cross the Rhine in 1859, the line ran to the Centralbahnhof (central station). This was a combined terminus and through station. The trains of the Rhenish Railway Company from Aachen ended at four terminal tracks. Two thoroughfares mainly served trains of the Cologne-Minden Railway Company (Cöln-Mindener Eisenbahn-Gesellschaft). Today's Cologne Hauptbahnhof (main station) was built from 1892 to 1894 because the capacity of the station was no longer able to cope with the increased traffic. The station was badly damaged during the Second World War and the station building had to be demolished and replaced by a new building. Around 1990, two tracks were added on the north side for S-Bahn traffic, which are independent of the rest of the infrastructure. Today's station is one of the busiest stations in Germany because all trains that use the Cologne–Aachen high-speed line stop here.

=== Köln Hansaring station ===
The halt (Haltepunkt, technically a station without points) of Köln Hansaring, which is named after the ring road it lies above, was opened at line-km 0.8 (on this line, distance from Cologne Hauptbahnhof) at the same time as the construction of two additional S-Bahn tracks at Cologne Hauptbahnhof and on the Hohenzollern Bridge in 1990. It is connected to the Cologne Stadtbahn station of the same name, which was opened in 1974, and has an island platform and is served by all S-Bahn trains that pass through the Hauptbahnhof, as well as Regionalbahn line RB 25 (Oberbergische Bahn), which is to be converted to an S-Bahn line.

Immediately behind the stop is the Cologne ICE workshop (Bahnbetriebswerk Köln), which is bypassed to the north by mainline trains running towards Aachen and the S-Bahn line and to the south by mainline trains running towards Cologne Hauptbahnhof. The S-Bahn line, which runs north of the tracks for other traffic near Cologne Hauptbahnhof, crosses to the south over a flyover between Köln Hansaring and Köln-Ehrenfeld and it remains to the south to its end in Düren.

=== Köln-Ehrenfeld station ===
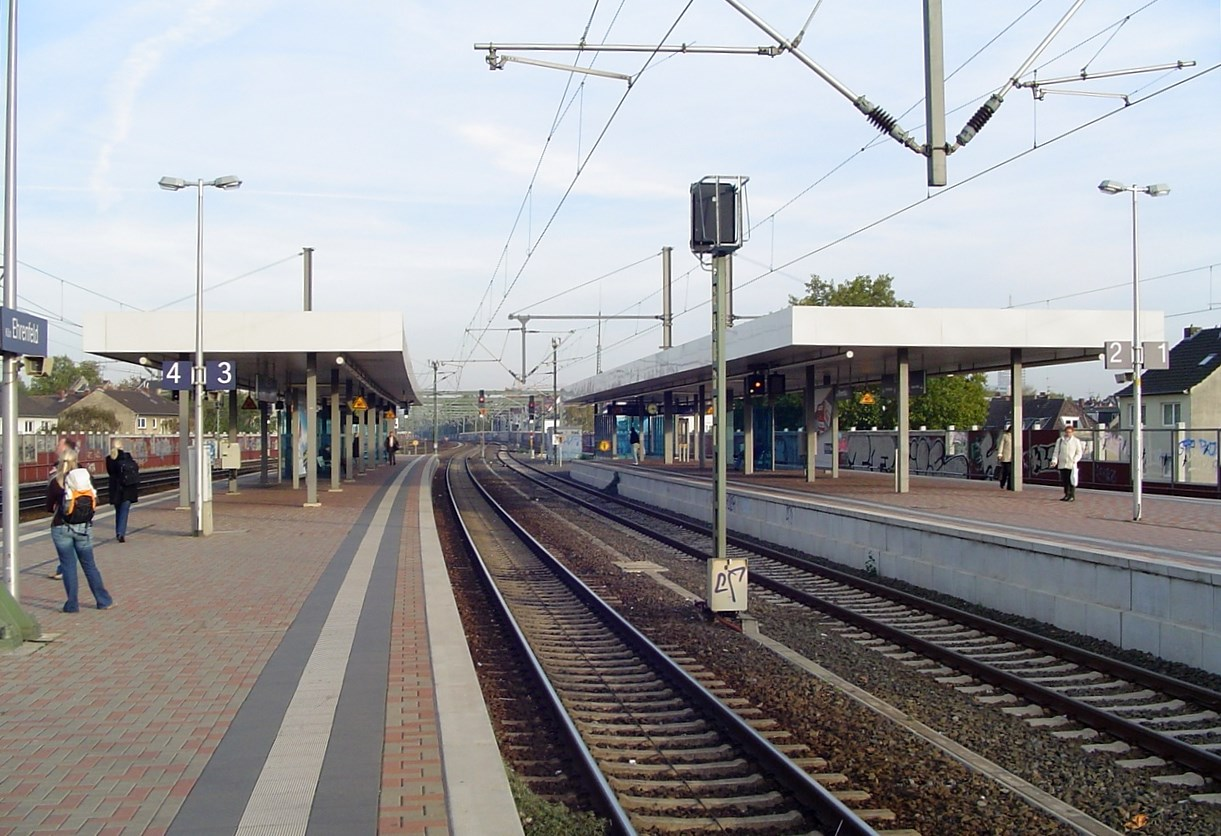
Köln-Ehrenfeld station, view from platform 3

Köln-Ehrenfeld station was built at line-km 3.7 between Cologne and Müngersdorf with the construction of the first section in 1839. Köln-Ehrenfeld station has two platforms with four platform tracks, to the north of which there are two tracks without a platform for through passenger and freight trains. Tracks 1 and 2 are used for S-Bahn traffic, tracks 3 and 4 for regional traffic. Cologne-Ehrenfeld is a scheduled stop for all regional services passing through it. Not far from the station is the Venloer Straße/Gürtel underground station of the Cologne Stadtbahn. The Cologne-Aachen high-speed railway crosses Ehrenfeldgürtel (Ehrenfeld belt), part of the Cologne ring road, at Köln-Ehrenfeld Cologne station.

In and around Köln-Ehrenfeld station, the railway runs on a viaduct. Some arches of this viaduct were formerly used as storage space, others were neglected. There were also problems with moisture penetration. The arches were to be refurbished in 2015, with self-supporting inner shells. Subsequently, a private investor was to create a shopping mile with restaurants. There is currently a discotheque in three of the arches.

=== Köln-Müngersdorf Technologiepark station ===
The halt of Köln-Müngersdorf Technologiepark is located in the east of Cologne's Müngersdorf district at line-km 5.9. It was established with the construction of the S-Bahn to Düren in 2002. The station has a partially covered island platform, which is connected by two sets of stairs and a lift to the street below, on which there is a Kölner Verkehrsbetriebe (Cologne Transport) bus stop.

=== Belvedere station ===
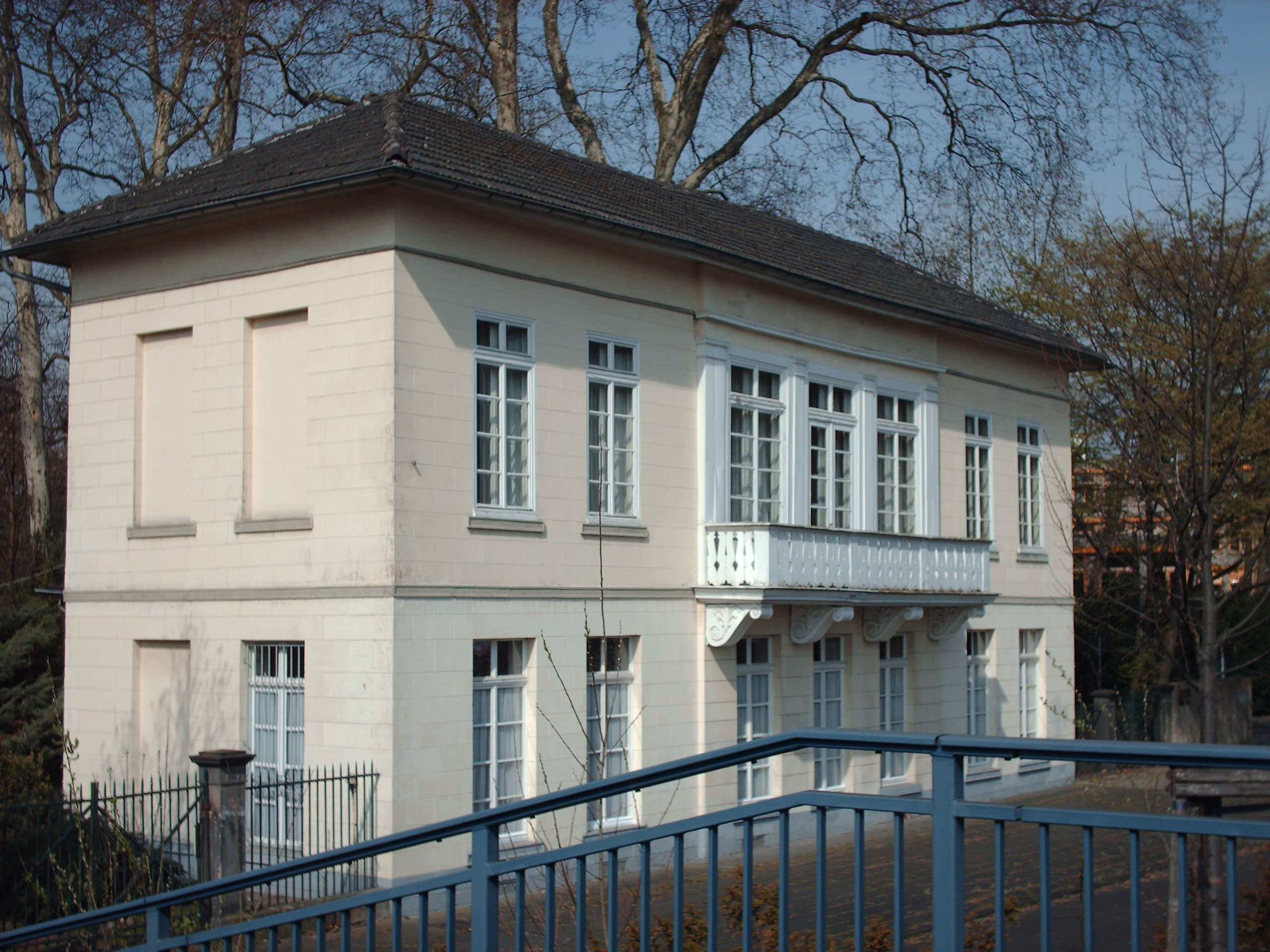
Station building of the former Belvedere station

The first section of the Cologne–Aachen line, which was opened on 2 August 1839, ran to Müngersdorf, with the terminus of the line at Belvedere station (line-km 7.0) until the opening of Lövenich station. For excursion guests from downtown Cologne, a small station building that housed a restaurant was built on a hill north of the cutting through which the line ran. With the extension of the line to Aachen, Müngersdorf station, the “Belvedere house”, became less and less important. The station was never very important for operations and was closed before 1892. Today there are no operating facilities at the station. The station building, which has meanwhile been used as a residential building, still exists and is listed as the "oldest station in Germany in its original form" in the Cologne heritage list.

=== Lövenich station ===
Köln-Lövenich station was opened on 2 July 1840 with the second phase of construction of the line at line-km 9.0 and was the western terminus of the line for about a year. In 2002, an S-Bahn stop was built west of the station at 9.7 km (6.0 mi). At the same time, the former Cologne-Lövenich station was dismantled and is now used only for passing loops. The S-Bahn stop has an island platform between the S-Bahn tracks.

=== Köln-Weiden West station ===
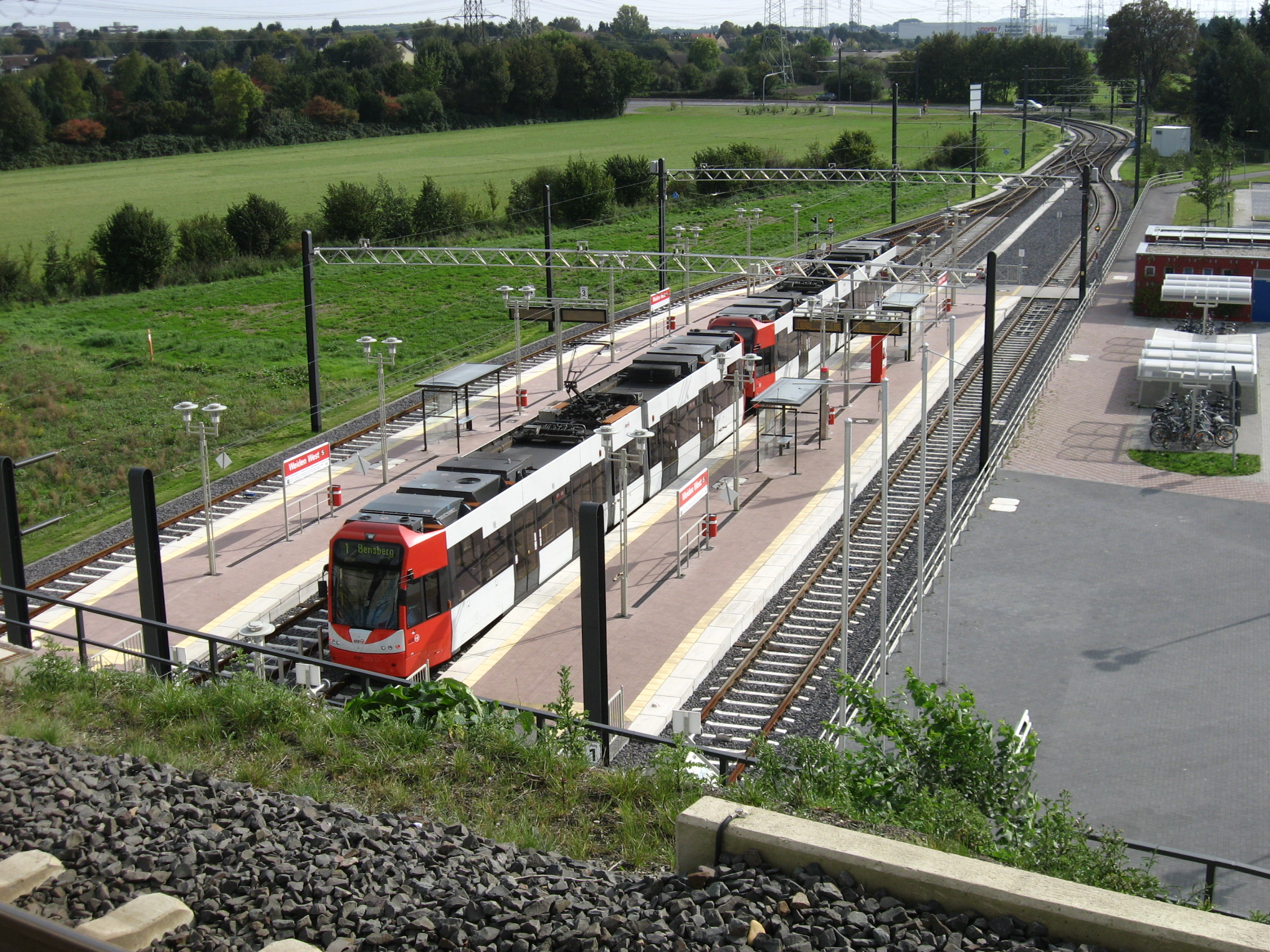
View from the platform in Weiden West to the Stadtbahn stop

The halt of Köln-Weiden West was built in 2006 in the run-up to the 2006 FIFA World Cup at line-km 11.1. At the same time, line 1 of the Cologne Stadtbahn was extended by about 1 km (0.62 mi) to the west and a new terminus was built with four tracks. The Cologne–Aachen line in Weiden West is located on an embankment. The Stadtbahn station is on ground level just south of the line, enabling direct interchange.

=== Frechen-Königsdorf station ===
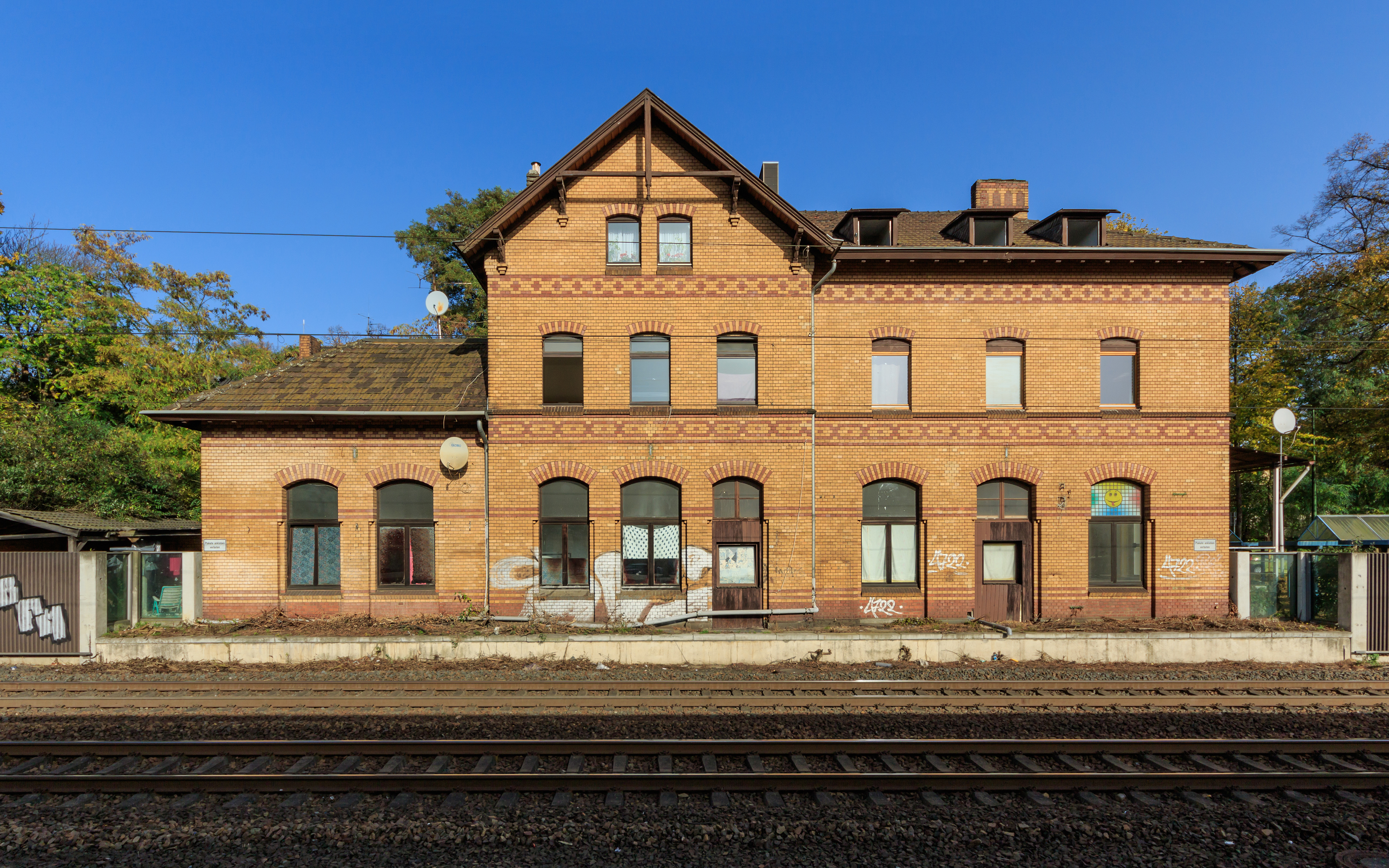
The old station building in Frechen-Königsdorf

With the extension of the line to Aachen in 1841, Großkönigsdorf station was established at line-km 13.8 km.

In 2000 the station was renamed Frechen-Königsdorf and in 2002 it was converted into an S-Bahn stop as part of the line upgrade. The station has an island platform and is connected to a pedestrian bridge running over the tracks. The station building north of the railway line still exists, but no longer has a platform and is currently used as a taxi control centre.

=== Königsdorf Tunnel ===
Königsdorf Tunnel was a 1,623-metre (5,325 ft)-long tunnel between Großkönigsdorf and Horrem at line-km 15.0. Construction began in 1837 and was completed in 1841. Up to 2,000 workers were employed in its construction. When it opened, the tunnel was the longest railway tunnel in Europe. The maximum coverage of the tunnel was 35 metres. Chimneys were built at this height to remove the smoke caused by steam locomotives.

The masonry was continuously damaged by seepage and exhaust gases from the steam locomotives, so that the tunnel was in great need of restoration at the beginning of the 1930s. The tunnel was not exactly straight when built, so over time work was carried out to straighten it, which further reduced its stability. Refurbishment began in 1937, but was never completed due to the Second World War. After parts of the tunnel wall flaked off in early 1954 and protruded into the clearance profile, a third track was laid in the middle of the tunnel to make room for supporting scaffolding. In March 1954 the speed limit in the tunnel was 10 km/h (6 mph). Because the electrification of the railway line was planned anyway, requiring an expansion of the structure gauge of the tunnel for the overhead wire, it was considered necessary to dismantle the tunnel and convert it into a cutting. By December 1955, 4 million cubic metres of soil had been excavated using bucket chain excavators and transported via a conveyor belt to a pit at a nearby briquette factory. At the same time, the Horrem Bridge was built for the North-South Railway from Rheinbraun (now part of RWE Power). The cutting was widened with the help of sheet piling and the line was raised to allow for the laying of two additional tracks for the S-Bahn in 2002. Today there is nothing left of the former tunnel. Parts of the east portal are commemorated.

=== Horrem station ===
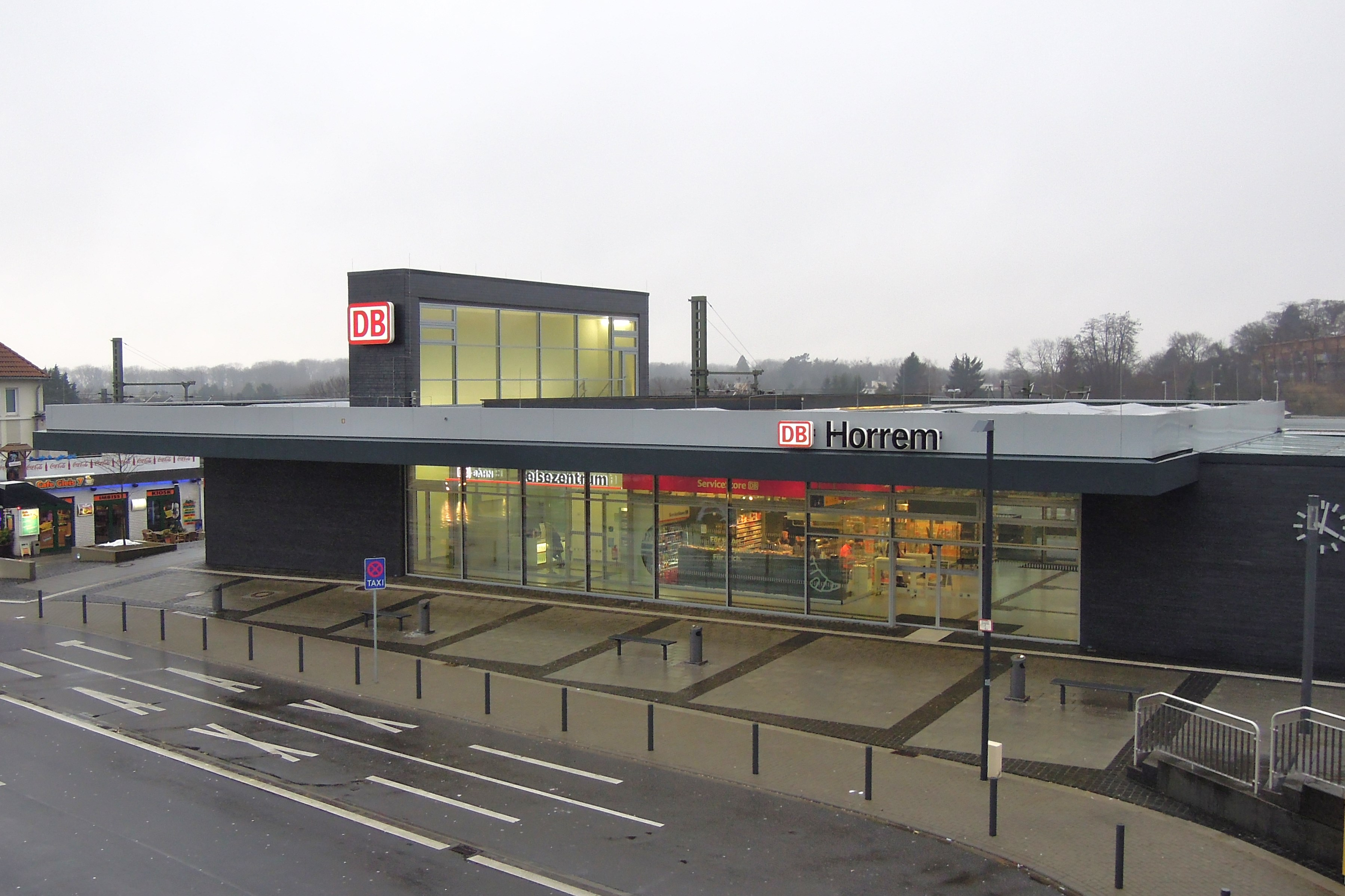
Newly built Horrem station building

Horrem station was opened in 1841 at line-km 18.7. It was converted into an S-Bahn station in 2002. The Erft Railway branches off from the Cologne-Aachen high-speed line at the station. It has two island platform tracks for operations on the Erft Railway and four platform tracks and three through tracks for operations on the high-speed line. Until 2001, Horrem station had a freight yard to its north. There are commuter parking spaces in this area. The forecourt and entrance building were fundamentally rebuilt from 2010 to 2014. A "green station" was built, with CO_{2}-neutral operations. This involved the installation of photovoltaic and geothermal systems and the use of ecological building materials. There are now a waiting room, a kiosk and a bookshop in the entrance building.

There is a tectonic fault in the area of Horrem station. The long-distance tracks pass over this on a special structure that is underground and can hydraulically compensate for earth movements. The other tracks have special rail joints at this point.

=== Sindorf station ===
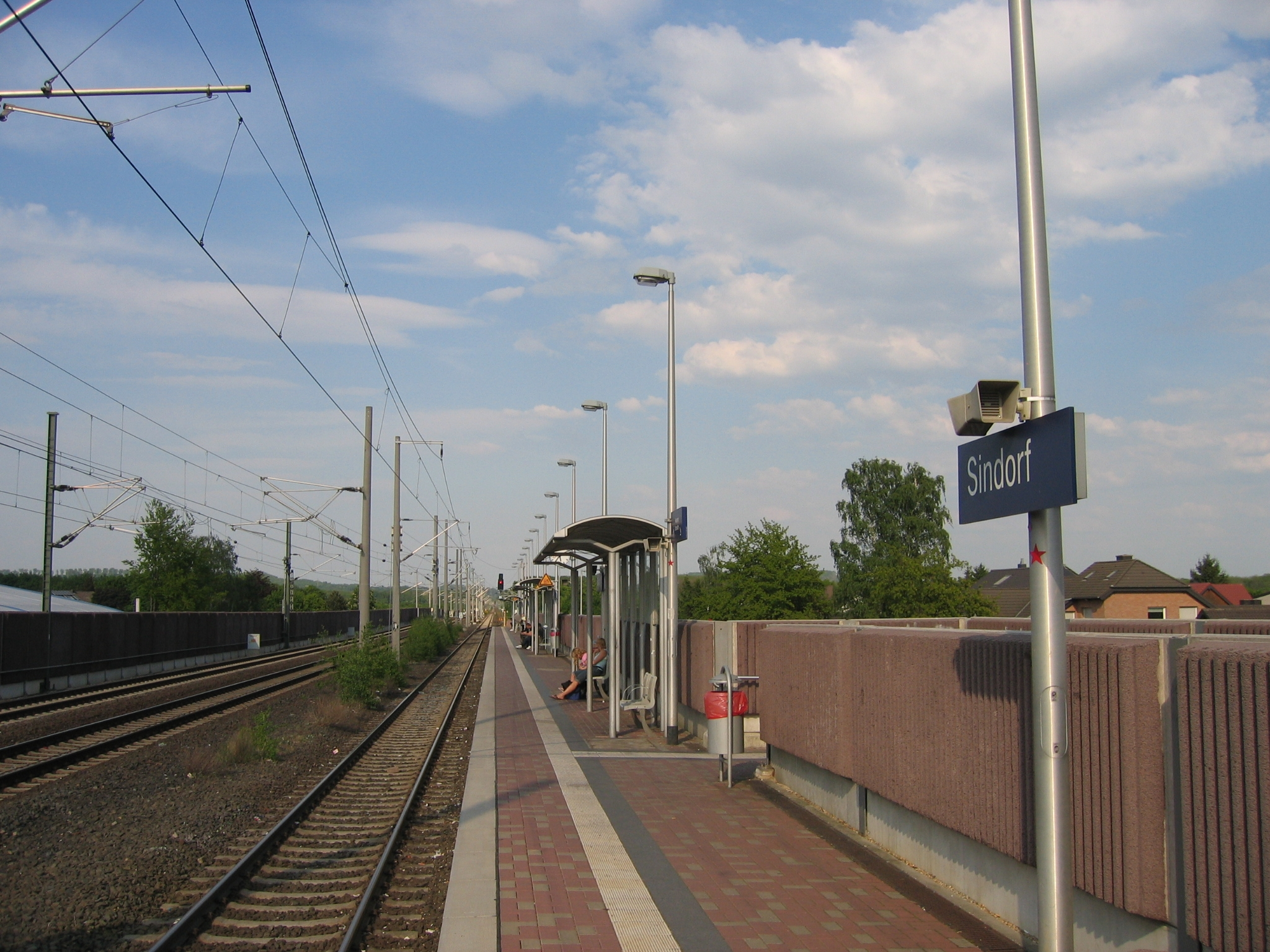
Sindorf station

Sindorf station was opened at line-km 22.4 between Dorsfeld and Horrem in 1912. The station had a platform north and south of the old line. The former Dorsfeld station was abandoned at the same time. Dorsfeld was a junction for sidings to the nearby gravel pits. Dorsfeld station became the location of overtaking loops for freight traffic with the opening of the parallel S-Bahn line in 2002. The Blatzheim block post was located at line-km 25.8 from 1952 to 1966. With the commissioning of the S-Bahn line, Sindorf station was also relocated to line-km 21.4 and redesignated as a halt. The station is in the south-east of the Kerpen district of Sindorf and has a side platform on the south side of the S-Bahn line. This is bounded to the south by a noise barrier and the entrances and exits are at the ends of the platform.

=== Buir station ===
Buir station had two platform tracks at an island platform and a passing track from its construction at line-km 30.3 in 1841 to the reconstruction of the line in 2002. Since the upgrade of the line, the tracks used by timetable route 480 and two S-Bahn lines have run through the station. A malt factory located next to the station formerly had a siding.

While all of the S-Bahn only stations on the upgraded line have an island platform except for Sindorf station (single side platform), Buir station has two side platforms north and south of the S-Bahn tracks. The northern side platform is separated from the mainline tracks by a noise barrier. Access to the northern platform is via an underpass. In the Buir area, the Cologne–Aachen line runs for about 8 km (5.0 mi) next to the Hambach lignite mine railway and autobahn 4.

=== Merzenich station ===
There was a station in the Merzenich area from 1841 to 1880 at line-km 35.0 at the site of the former junction of the Düren–Neuss railway. This was never served by trains on the Cologne–Aachen line. The new Merzenich station opened on 29 April 2003 and put into operation for the S-Bahn. It has an island platform and a large commuter parking area. It is served by lines S 13 and S 19 and can be reached using tickets issued by both the Aachener Verkehrsverbund (Aachen Transport Association) and the Verkehrsverbund Rhein-Sieg (Rhine-Sieg Transport Association). Overtaking loops were also built at line-km 36.7 as part of the upgrade of the line.

=== Düren station ===
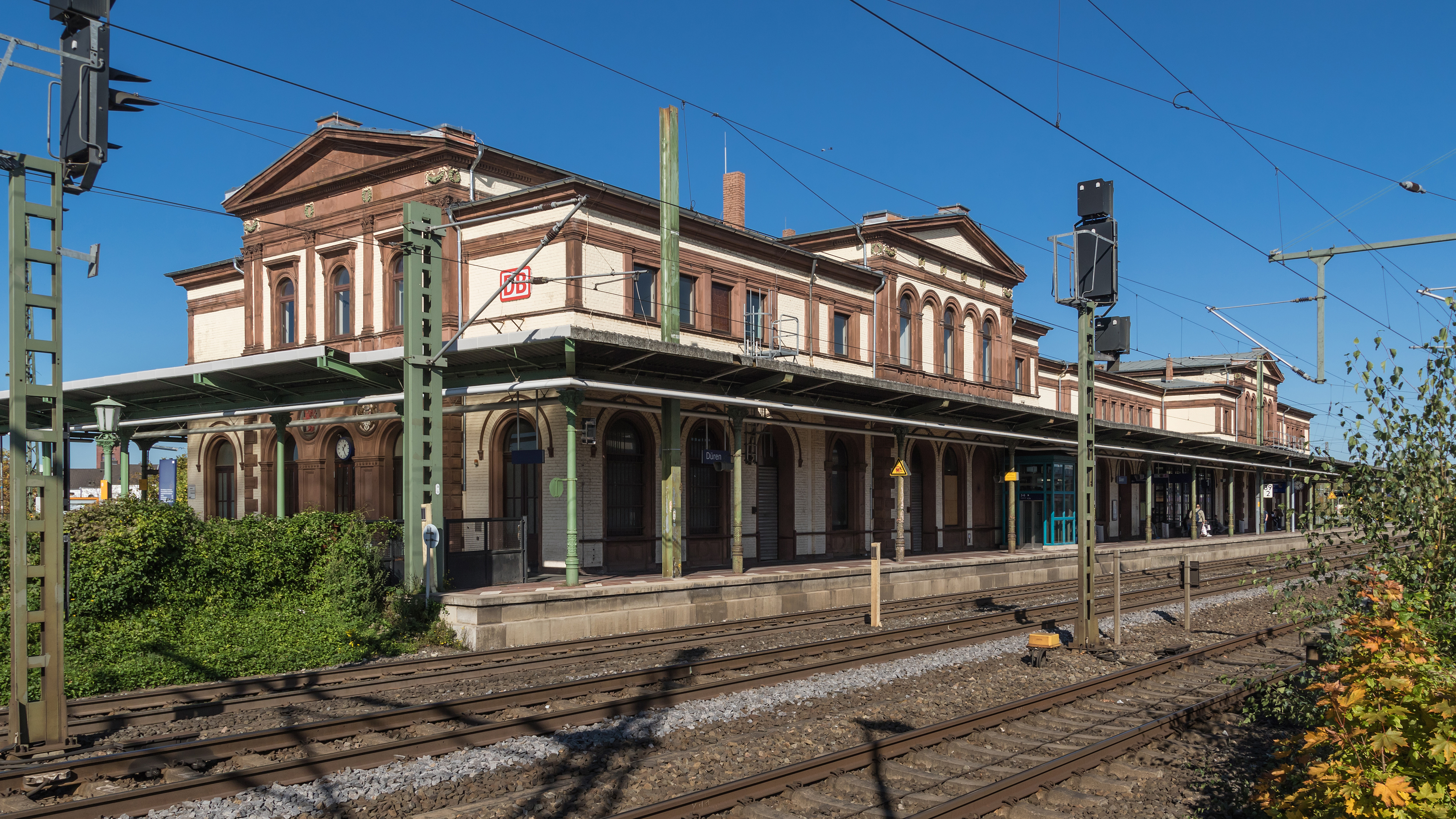
Düren station building

Düren station was opened in 1841 at line-km 39.2 and soon developed into a hub for rail transport. By 1900, the Düren–Heimbach, Jülich–Düren, Düren–Neuss and Düren–Euskirchen lines had been established with Düren as the starting point. From 1933 to 1986 there was a motive power depot (Bahnbetriebswerk) in Düren. The entrance building was opened in 1874 and, unlike the city centre of Düren, was not destroyed in the air raid of 16 November 1944. It is located as an island station (Inselbahnhof) between the tracks for traffic to Jülich to the north and the tracks of the Cologne–Aachen line to the south. Regional express trains towards Aachen stop at the home platform (platform 1). The platforms for regional express trains and S-Bahn trains running towards Cologne and trains of the Euregiobahn towards Aachen can be reached via an underpass. Some long-distance trains also stop in Düren. Although there are other stations in the area of the city of Düren, Düren station does not bear the designation of Hauptbahnhof (main station), unlike most main stations in German towns with several stations.

=== Triangular Truss bridge ===
The Cologne–Aachen line crosses the Rur river over the Triangular Truss bridge (Dreigurtbrücke) at line-km 39.8. The bridge has a span of 78 metres and was built from 1928 to 1929 as a replacement for a brick bridge built with the original railway. The structure, which is now a listed building, is currently in a dilapidated condition. The economics of its renovation are doubtful.

=== Hubertushof and Gürzenich ===
The Hubertushof connection point as required (Bedarfsanschlussstelle) is located at line-km 41.3. This junction served the Bundeswehr (federal defence forces) for its premises in the Hürtgenwald (Gürzenicher Bruch). The Gürzenich block post was also located there from 1925 to 1952. About a kilometre south of the village, but still part of Gürzenich, there is a Bundeswehr depot where weapons and material were stored mainly for the Air Force airbase in Nörvenich, about 15 km (9.3 mi) away. The 150-hectare depot was closed in 2009.

Guerzenich also had a freight yard. The branch line to the freight yard branched off from the tram line to Guerzenich on today's Papiermühle (formerly Mühlenweg). There was a connecting track to the Distelrath–Schneidhausen railway (Ringbahn) at Breuer's Häuschen. The Gürzenich freight yard had a loading and transfer track and there was a connection to the Düren–Aachen railway. All freight traffic towards Rölsdorf and Lendersdorf was handled on this track from 1944 until the Rur Bridge of the Ringbahn was restored.

=== Derichsweiler and Merode ===
Until November 2002, the Derichsweiler overtaking loops were located at line-km 44.3. It was a halt for passenger traffic from 1843 to 1928. When this section of the line was converted to computer-based interlocking technology, the Derichsweiler overtaking loops were abandoned and the points and the catenary on the passing tracks were dismantled. The western part of the former yard is now controlled from the Langerwehe electronic signalling control centre, while the eastern part is controlled from Düren. The former signal box building has been preserved, but is no longer used. The Merode block post was established at line-km 46.5 in 1965/1966.

=== Langerwehe station ===
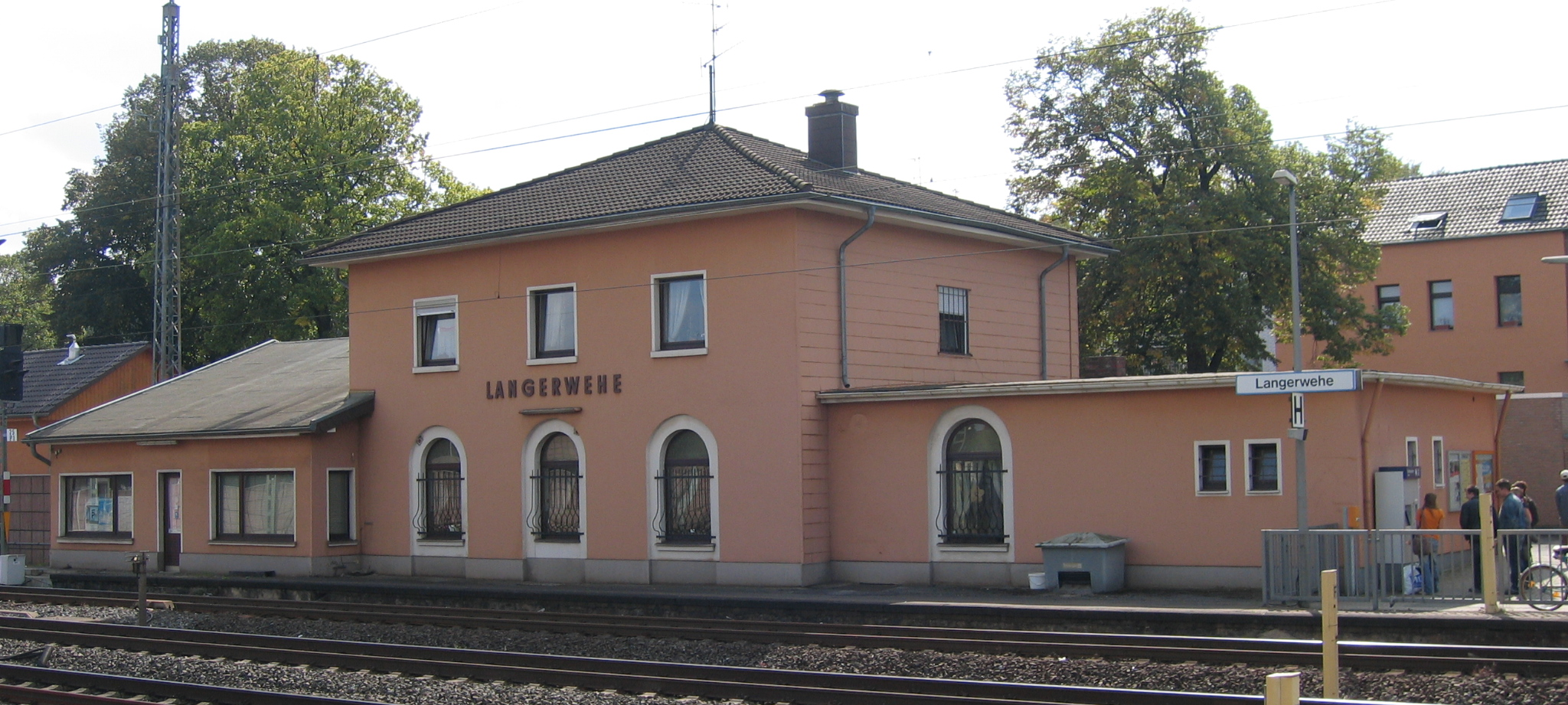
Langerwehe entrance building

Langerwehe station (line-km 48.9) has two platform tracks on the Cologne–Aachen line with side platforms north and south of the two through line tracks. The Eschweiler-Weisweiler Langerwehe line, built in 2009, ends in Langerwehe. Euregiobahn trains from Eschweiler-Weisweiler arrive at a third platform built in 2009. The through platform tracks on the Cologne–Aachen railway are used by Regional-Express services and Euregiobahn trains that are bound for Düren.

The two-storey station building dates from the time the line was built (1841) and was enlarged by two one-storey extensions at the beginning of the 20th century. As the platforms were moved a few metres to the west during the reconstruction of the line around 2000, the entrance building now has no direct access to the platform.

=== Nothberg station ===
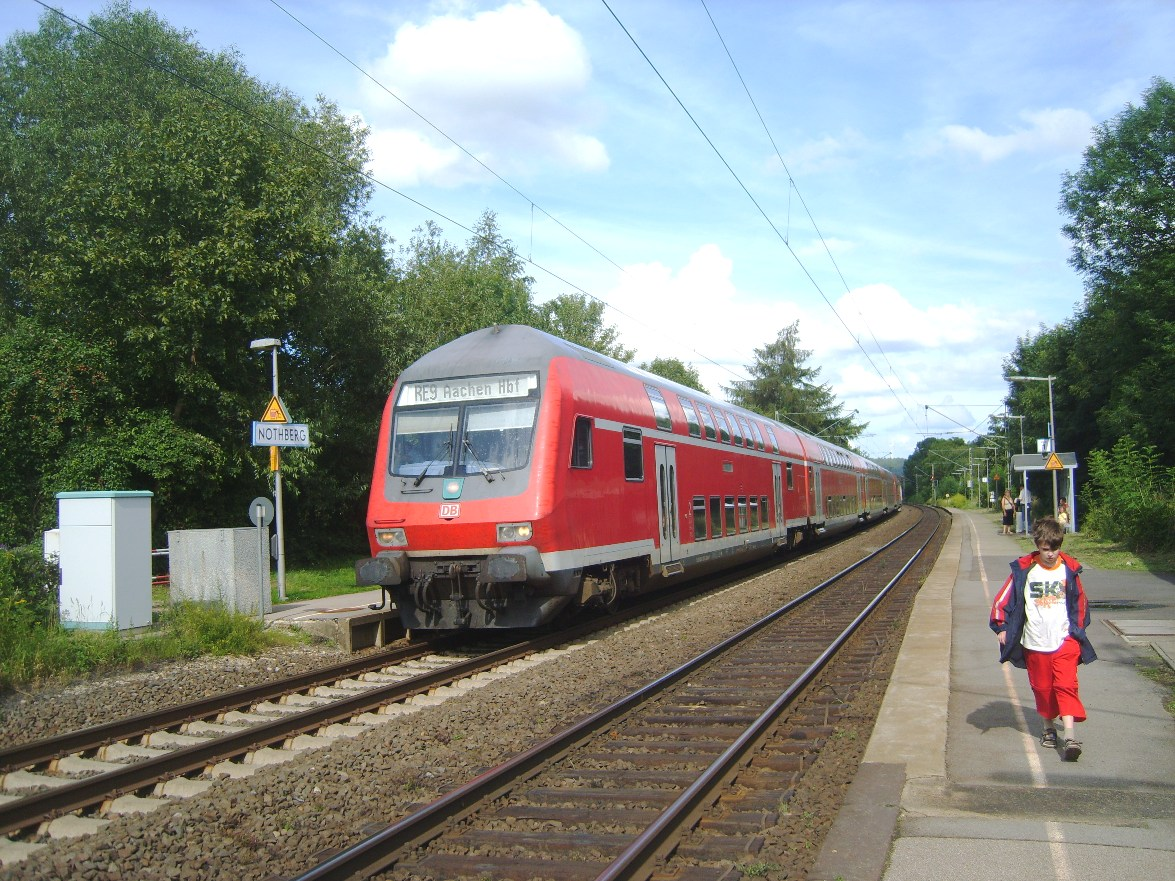
Nothberg station two years before its closure

The halt of Nothberg was built in 1905 at the southern end of the Eschweiler district of Nothberg at line-km 54.1. It had two side platforms and a small building with a ticket office until the 1970s. A road underpass west of the halt had to be used to connect the platforms. Recently, Nothberg station was only served by the Rhein-Sieg-Express every hour. When the new Eschweiler-Weisweiler Langerwehe line went into operation in 2009, Nothberg station on the Cologne–Aachen railway was closed due to the low number of passengers and replaced by the Eschweiler-Nothberg Euregiobahn station. The platforms and a small parking lot at the western end still exist. Signs forbid entry to the closed station.

A siding branched off to the Reserve colliery between Nothberg station and Eschweiler Hauptbahnhof from 1864. The coal mined there was loaded onto trains at a yard at the mine site. After the coal mining ended, the colliery buildings including the siding were demolished. However, its course can still be seen in modern satellite images.

The Hücheln block post was built at line-km 52.0 in 1965/1966.

=== Eschweiler Hauptbahnhof ===
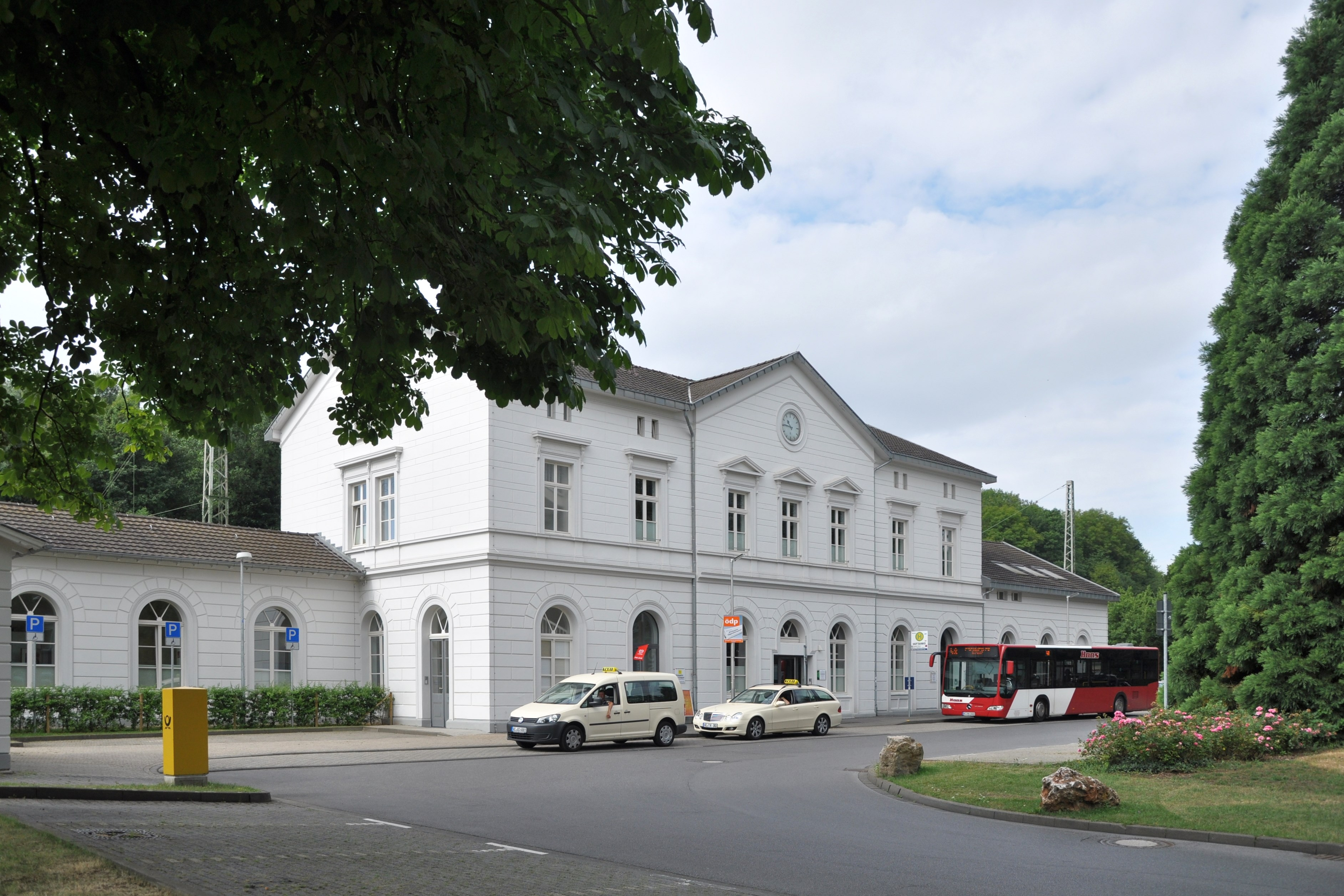
Eschweiler Hauptbahnhof entrance building

Since 1841, Eschweiler Hauptbahnhof has been located at line-km 56.9 in the Röthgen district of Eschweiler and has four tracks, three of which are platform tracks with the house platform (next to the entrance building) as a side platform and an island platform. The station is served by the NRW-Express and the Rhein-Sieg-Express. The Euregiobahn service stops instead at the Eschweiler Talbahnhof (valley station) on the Mönchengladbach–Stolberg railway. The entrance building was built in 1860 and is now owned by the city of Eschweiler. A kiosk, a travel agency and a dental practice are located in the entrance building. In the past, the station was served by a line of the Aachen Tramway and handled freight. The tram line was discontinued in 1954 and general freight operations ended in 1984. The goods shed was replaced by a parking lot in 2008. The station is currently being renovated because it is not barrier-free due to its 38-centimetre (15.0 in)-high platforms and lack of lifts.

=== Ichenberg Tunnel ===
The Ichenberg tunnel is located at line-km 57.0 immediately west of Eschweiler Hauptbahnhof and is now 95 metres long. During the Second World War, it was blown up by retreating Wehrmacht troops and rebuilt by American pioneers. Since the cross-section of the tunnel was too narrow for the upcoming electrification, the tunnel was opened out for a length of 255 metres in 1962 and the modern shorter tunnel was rebuilt in concrete.

=== Three Arch bridge ===
The railway line crosses the Inde river and the Mönchengladbach–Stolberg railway over the Three Arch bridge (Dreibogenbrücke) (line-km 57.9). The bridge is built of brick and has existed since the opening of the railway in 1841. In the Second World War, an arch was blown up and initially replaced by American pioneers with a temporary steel structure and then restored to its original design in 1950.

=== Stolberg Hauptbahnhof ===
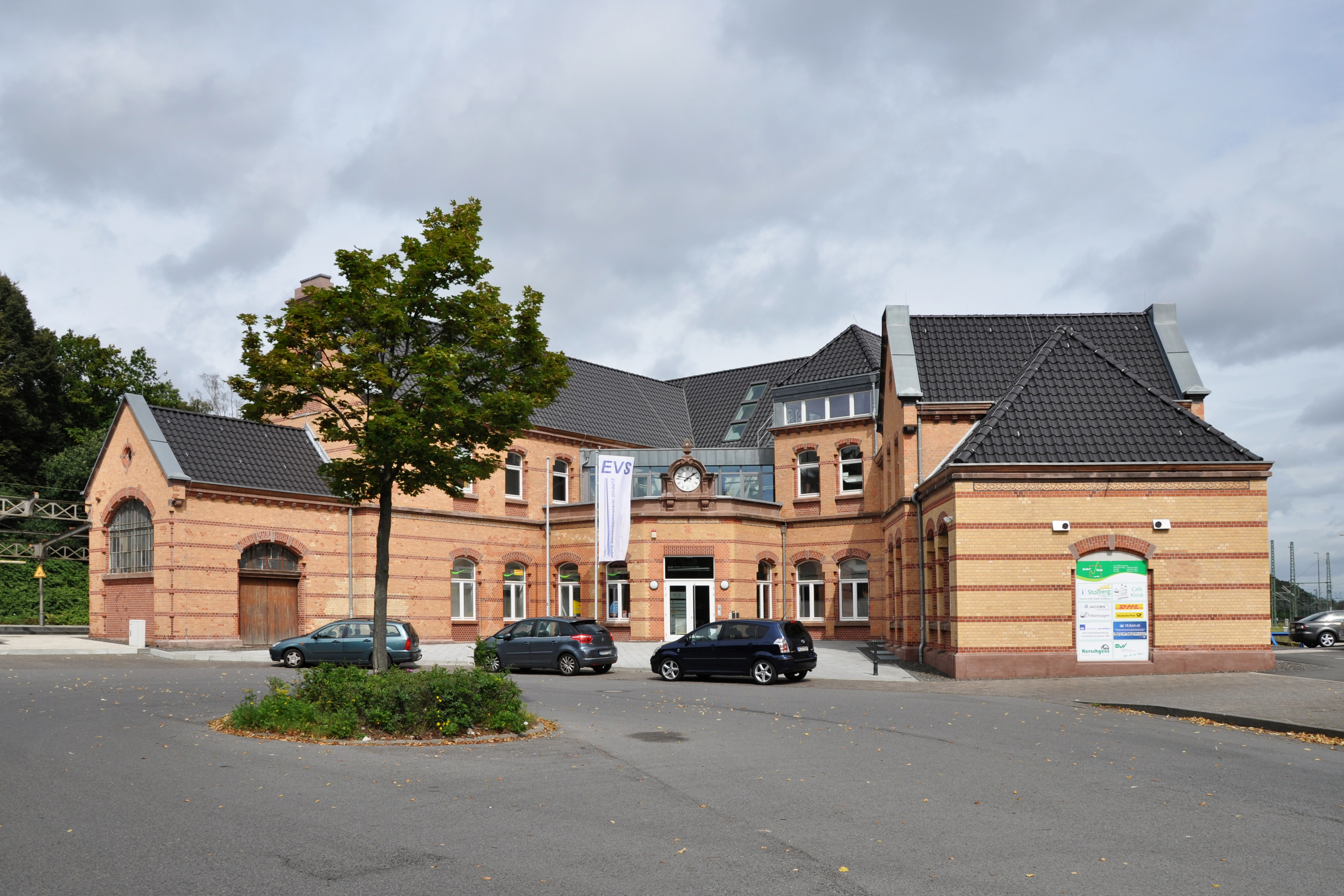
Renovated entrance building of the Stolberg Hauptbahnhof

Due to the changes in the route as a result of the railway dispute, Stolberg Hauptbahnhof was built in 1841, not in the centre of the city of Stolberg, but three kilometres north of Stolberg in what was then part of Eschweiler. Due to the location outside the centre of the town at line-km 60.3, there were large open areas that made it possible to develop Stolberg Hauptbahnhof into a railway junction. The Mönchengladbach–Stolberg, Stolberg–Walheim, Stolberg–Herzogenrath lines and the now closed Stolberg–Münsterbusch and Stolberg–Kohlscheid lines were built by 1900, all starting from Stolberg Hauptbahnhof. The entrance building was completed in 1888. Due to its location at the divergence of the Cologne–Aachen and the Stolberg–Walheim lines, Stolberg Hbf is a wedge-shaped station (Keilbahnhof). Freight tracks were built to the west, south and east of the station, which in the meantime were connected to each other by a connecting railway that used a bridge structure. A locomotive depot with a roundhouse was built south of the station. Of these facilities, only the freight tracks east of the station are still used today.

Stolberger Hauptbahnhof has three platform tracks on the Cologne–Aachen line. The central platform is used for traffic with Regional-Express and Euregiobahn services to Aachen and the house platform for Euregiobahn services from Aachen. The station building was acquired in 2010 by EVS Euregio Verkehrsschienennetz, which renovated it for €3 million and converted it into a control centre. There is now a signal box for the lines maintained by EVS and used by the Euregiobahn.

=== Eilendorf Tunnel and Nirm Tunnel ===
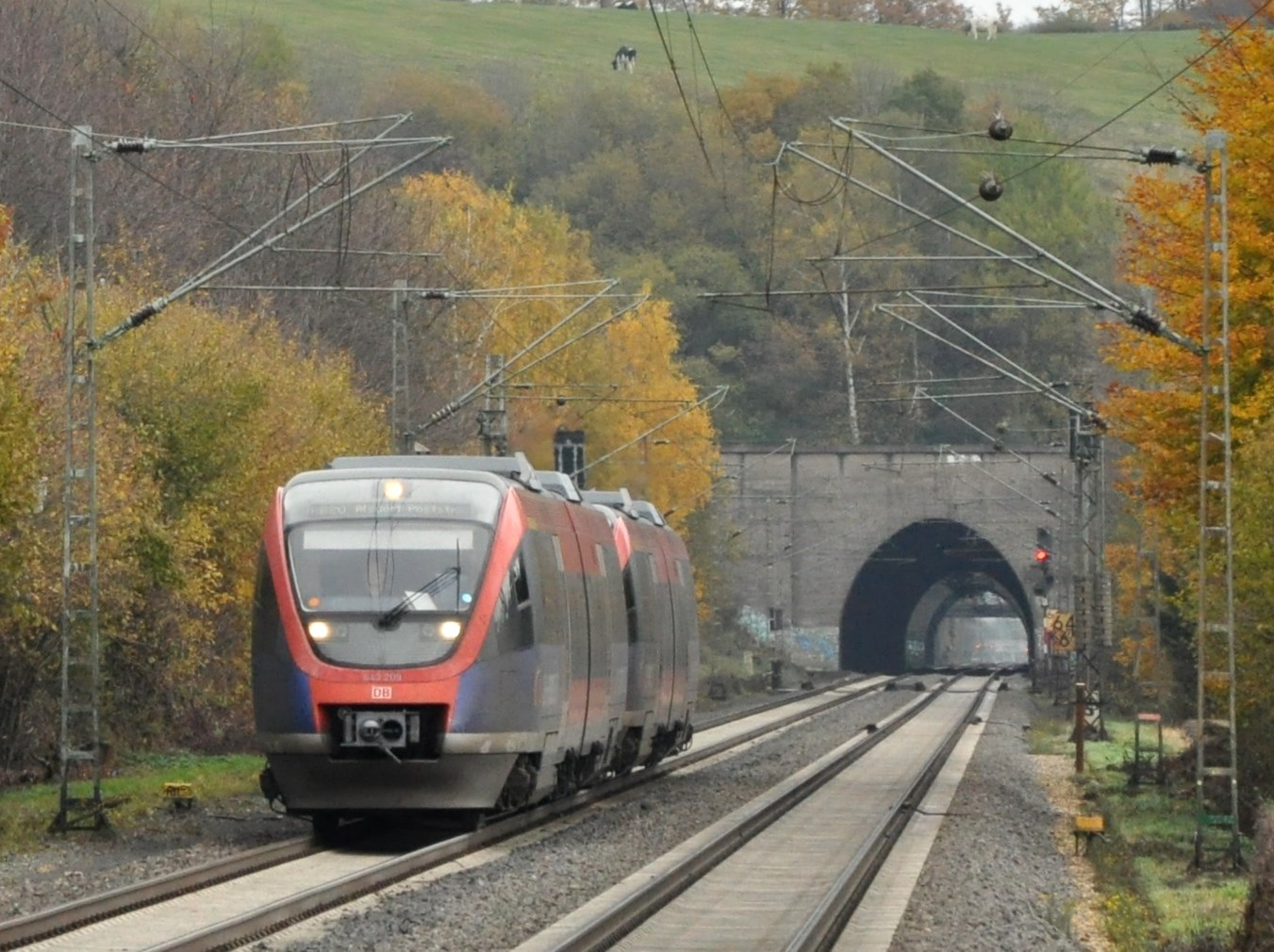
Bombardier Talent of Euregiobahn leaves Eilendorf Tunnel

A 727 m (2,385 ft)-long tunnel called the Nirmer Tunnel (Nirm Tunnel) was built between Stolberg and the location of modern Eilendorf at line-km 63.6 during the construction of the line and completed in 1841. Both miners from Eschweiler and workers from the Leipzig–Dresden railway were employed in the construction of the tunnel, using a method known as core construction (Kernbauweise—using three narrow tunnels to build the walls of the final tunnel before the tunnel core was removed). There were eight chimneys above the tunnel for the extraction of smoke produced by the steam locomotives. During the Second World War a bunker was built over the west portal. In 1963, it became clear that the cross-section of the tunnel, like the Königsdorf Tunnel and the Ichenberg Tunnel, was too narrow to allow the catenary to be installed. Therefore, the Nirm tunnel was partially opened out and converted into two smaller tunnels lined with concrete. The western tunnel is the Eilendorf Tunnel with a length of 357 metres (line-km 63.9) and the eastern tunnel is the Nirm Tunnel with a length of 125 metres. Although the two newly constructed tunnels were designed for speeds of up to 200 km/h (125 mph) and high-speed tests had been carried out with class E 03 locomotives, the permissible top speed today is 130 km/h (80 mph).

From 1944 to 1986, the Nirm block post was located at line-km 63.2.

=== Eilendorf station ===
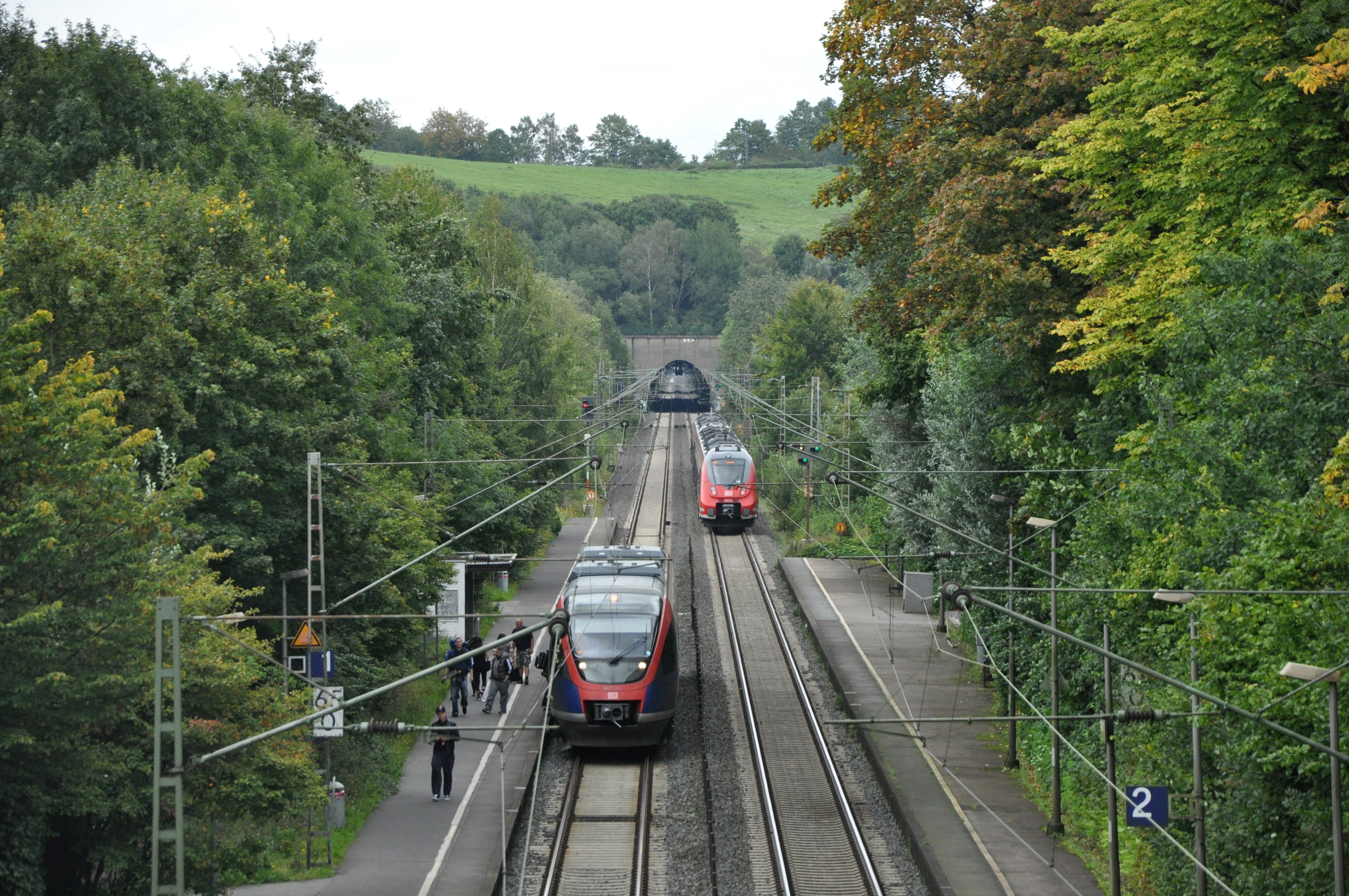
Eilendorf station photographed from the road bridge. Eilendorf Tunnel is in the background

The halt of Eilendorf was opened at line-km 64.9 as Nirm halt along with the line on 1 September 1841. It later closed but reopened in 1897. In 1920, an entrance building was built, which was demolished in the 1980s. By 1963, Nirm had an island platform and a passing track. During the electrification of the line, the halt was renamed Eilendorf, the passing track was dismantled and two side platforms, which still exist, were built. In 2018, the platforms had a height of 38 cm (15 in) and were therefore below the boarding height of the rail vehicles operated, which prevented barrier-free entry. In 2018, the platforms were raised to 76 cm (30 in) to enable level, barrier-free entry into the trains. The platforms, which were previously over 200 metres (660 ft) long, were shortened to 125 m (410 ft). There is no connection between the two platforms with a bridge or a tunnel; instead a road bridge to the west or an underpass to the east must be used, both of which require several hundred metres of walking. Therefore, passengers often cross the tracks without authorisation.

=== Aachen-Rothe Erde station ===
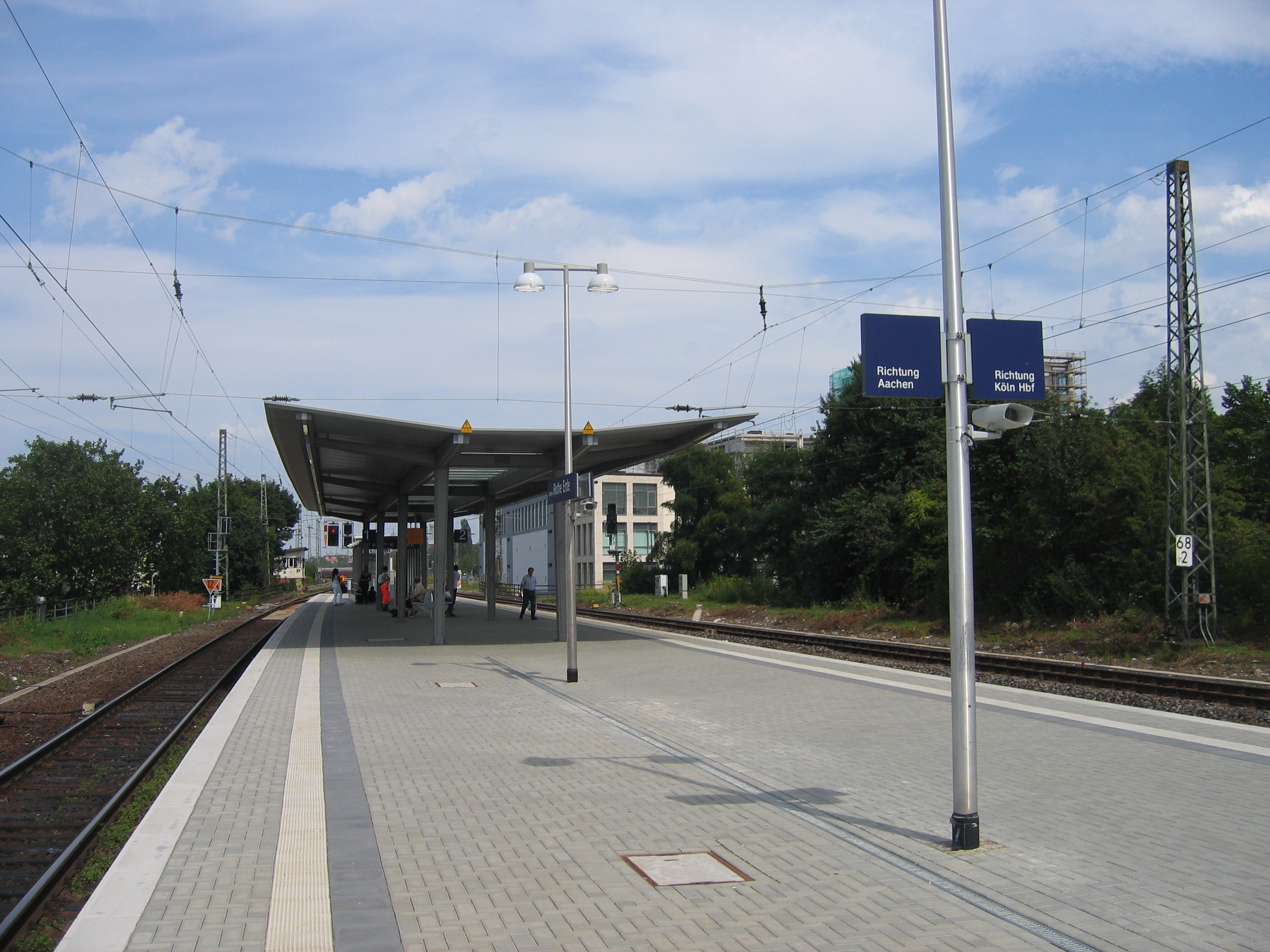
Platform in Aachen-Rothe Erde

Aachen-Rothe Erde station was built in 1875 as an interchange station for the Haaren–Aachen-Rothe Erde railway at line-km 68.2. From 1880 it was also used in passenger transport. The Vennbahn, which branched off the Cologne–Aachen railway in Rothe Erde was opened in 1885. The station received a locomotive depot and the freight yard was expanded. The current station building has existed since 1892 and is built into the railway embankment. After the Second World War, the connection with the Vennbahn and parts of the freight yard were closed. Today there is a shopping centre in the area. The passenger station has a platform with one-way tracks running towards Aachen and Cologne. To the east of this is a carriage yard for Euregiobahn railcars and for regional express sets. A branch line ran to the Aachen freight yard (Moltkebahnhof) from Rothe Erde station.

=== Aachen freight yard ===
Aachen freight yard, also known as the Moltkebahnhof (Moltke station) due to its location on Moltkestrasse (Moltke street), was a freight yard in the south of the city of Aachen, which was connected via a branch line to the Cologne–Aachen railway. The freight yard was opened in 1895, but freight traffic decreased from the mid-1960s, so that the freight yard was closed in the mid-1990s. Today there are, among other things, a park and a comprehensive school on the site.

=== Burtscheid Viaduct ===
Burtscheid Viaduct was built from 1838 to 1840 according to plans by engineers Wittfeld and Pickel. The originally 277-metre (909 ft)-long viaduct was partially blown up during the Second World War and rebuilt. It now has a length of 251 m (823 ft). A reinforced concrete pavement slab was added in the 1960s, and it was renovated from 2007 to 2009. Burtscheid Viaduct has two tracks. Aachen Hauptbahnhof is directly to its west.

=== Aachen Hauptbahnhof ===
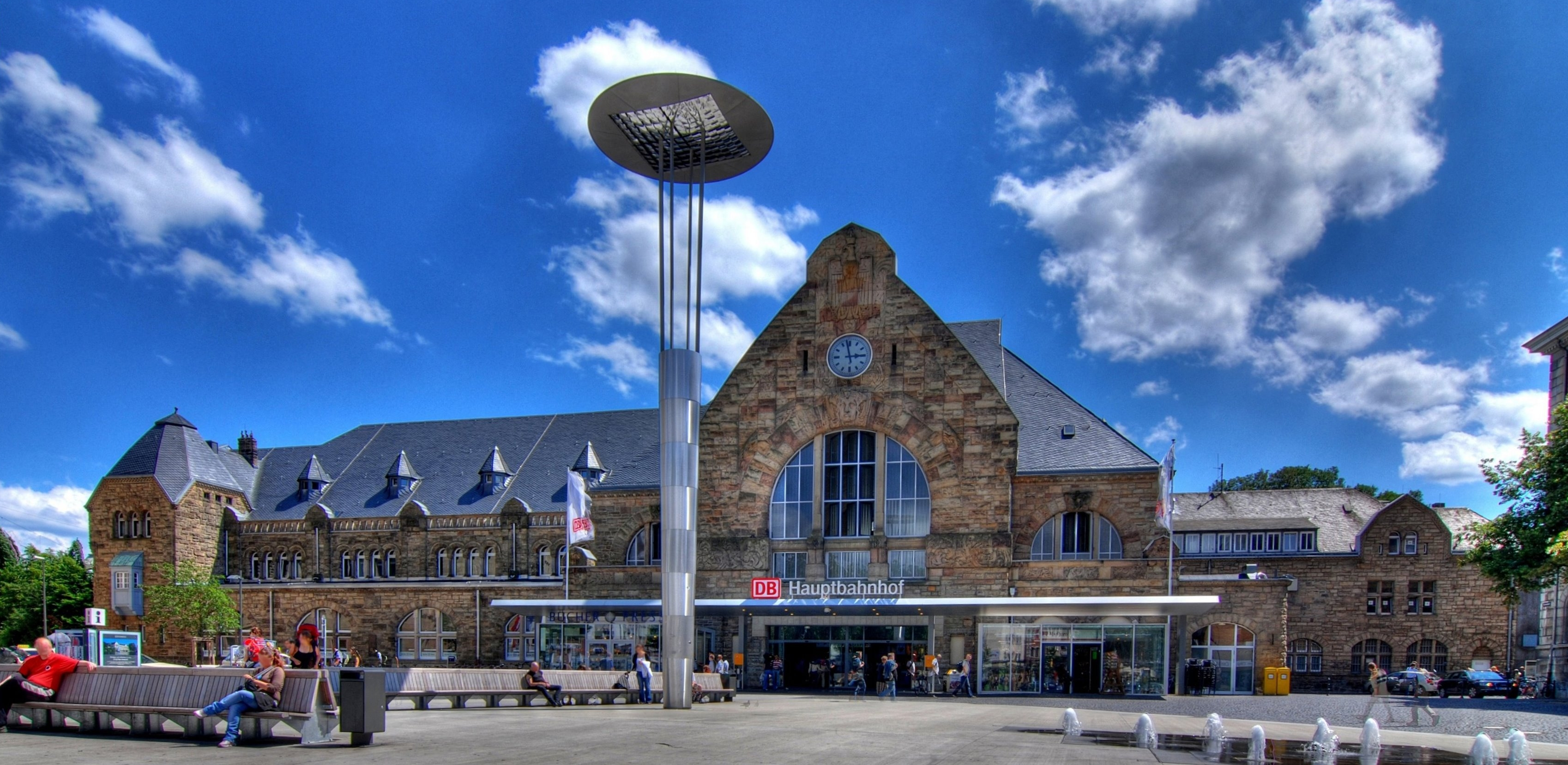
Aachen Hbf, view from the station forecourt

The Rhenish Railway Company opened the Rheinischen Bahnhof (Rhenish station) as the terminus of the Cologne–Aachen railway (line-km 70.2) in 1841. The current entrance building and the station concourse date from 1905 when the station was rebuilt as part of its merger with Aachen Marschierthor station, the terminus of the Aachen–Mönchengladbach railway. In the run-up to the electrification of the station, the tracks within the station hall were rearranged in 1966. Since then, Aachen Hauptbahnhof has had nine platform tracks, four of which are designed to enable the transition between electrical systems: the overhead lines can be switched to use either the 15 kV/16.7 Hz AC used in Germany or the 3 kV DC used in Belgium. A 3-S-Zentrale (a DB Station&Service station control centres) has been located in the entrance building since 2003.

All local and long-distance trains stop at Aachen Hauptbahnhof. With the exception of ICE International, Thalys and Euregiobahn services, all trains start and end here. The rolling stock of the NRW-Express, the Rhein-Sieg-Express and Euregiobahn are maintained in a DB Regio NRW depot to the west of the station.

== Rolling stock and operations ==
The Rhenish Railway Company started operations on the section to Müngersdorf with four steam locomotives, three of which were manufactured in England. The Carolus Magnus was built by the newly founded Dobbs & Poensgen locomotive factory in Aachen, but it was prone to failure and had to be rebuilt. It was only used to haul work trains and was sold early. The 10 locomotives were estimated to have operated a total at 5361 Prussian miles (40,382 km (25,092 mi)) in 1841. After the opening of the whole line, the number of locomotives used grew to a total of 21.

The original timetable provided three passenger trains (morning, noon and evening) between Cologne and Aachen per day and direction. Due to the line being single-track initially, trains were scheduled to cross in Düren. The two morning trains started or ended in Herbesthal. Passenger trains initially served all stops on the way until a pair of express trains was introduced between Cologne and Herbesthal in 1857. The first night train ran on the railway in May 1859. The first trains from Cologne to Paris were initially unlit, but lamps were eventually attached to the locomotives after an accident at a level crossing.

=== Prussian state railways ===
Under the nationalisation policy of Otto von Bismarck, the Cologne–Aachen railway became part of the Prussian state railways (Preußische Staatseisenbahnen). This greatly expanded the connections operated on the line. In 1913, there were also direct through coaches from Aachen via the line to Cologne, Berlin, Bremen, Frankfurt, Hamburg, Hanover, Kiel, Munich and Wiesbaden. The Ostend–Vienna Express started as a luxury train in 1894 and later operated as an international express. It included coaches that were attached/detached to the Orient-Express and was one of the most important connections between Western Europe and the Balkans. The service only ended in 1993.

=== Deutsche Bundesbahn ===
After the Second World War, Deutsche Bundesbahn took over the line that had been operated by Deutsche Reichsbahn from 1920 to 1945. In the first few years, steam locomotives from the Reichsbahn era were predominantly used: class 01 and class 03 locomotives in front of express trains and class 38.10 locomotives in front of other passenger trains. Class 50 and class 55.25 locomotives hauled most freight trains. Individual trains were operated with VT 36.5 diesel railcars. In addition, the line was used by international express trains such as the Ostend–Vienna Express, which took only 1:03 hours from Cologne to Aachen.

In the 1960s and 1970s, several Trans Europ Express train pairs ran on the Cologne–Aachen line. Diesel railcars of class VT 11.5 (e.g. Hamburg–Paris) and trains with French TEE coaches were used. The VT 08 class was used for long-distance express (F) trains. In addition, international expresses hauled by Belgian steam locomotives ran to Cologne. Electrification was completed in 1966, and from then on electric locomotives were mostly used for passenger transport. Mainly class 110 and Belgian multi-system locomotives of class 16 and later also class 18 ran in long-distance transport and initially class 141 were operated in local transport. The new class 184 multi-system locomotives delivered in the autumn of 1966 (also marketed as Europalokomotiven—"European locomotives") were extensively tested in Germany–Belgium traffic, but were only rarely used later because the locomotives often failed due to frequent strong voltage fluctuations in the Belgian overhead line, so from 1971 they were no longer used for passenger services to Belgium and were relocated to the Saarland in 1979. The international daytime passenger services were therefore largely operated from the 1970s to the 1990s with Belgian multi-system locomotives. Locomotives for freight transport were changed in Aachen-West and locomotives for overnight express trains were changed in Aachen Hbf.

=== Current operations ===
==== Passenger services ====
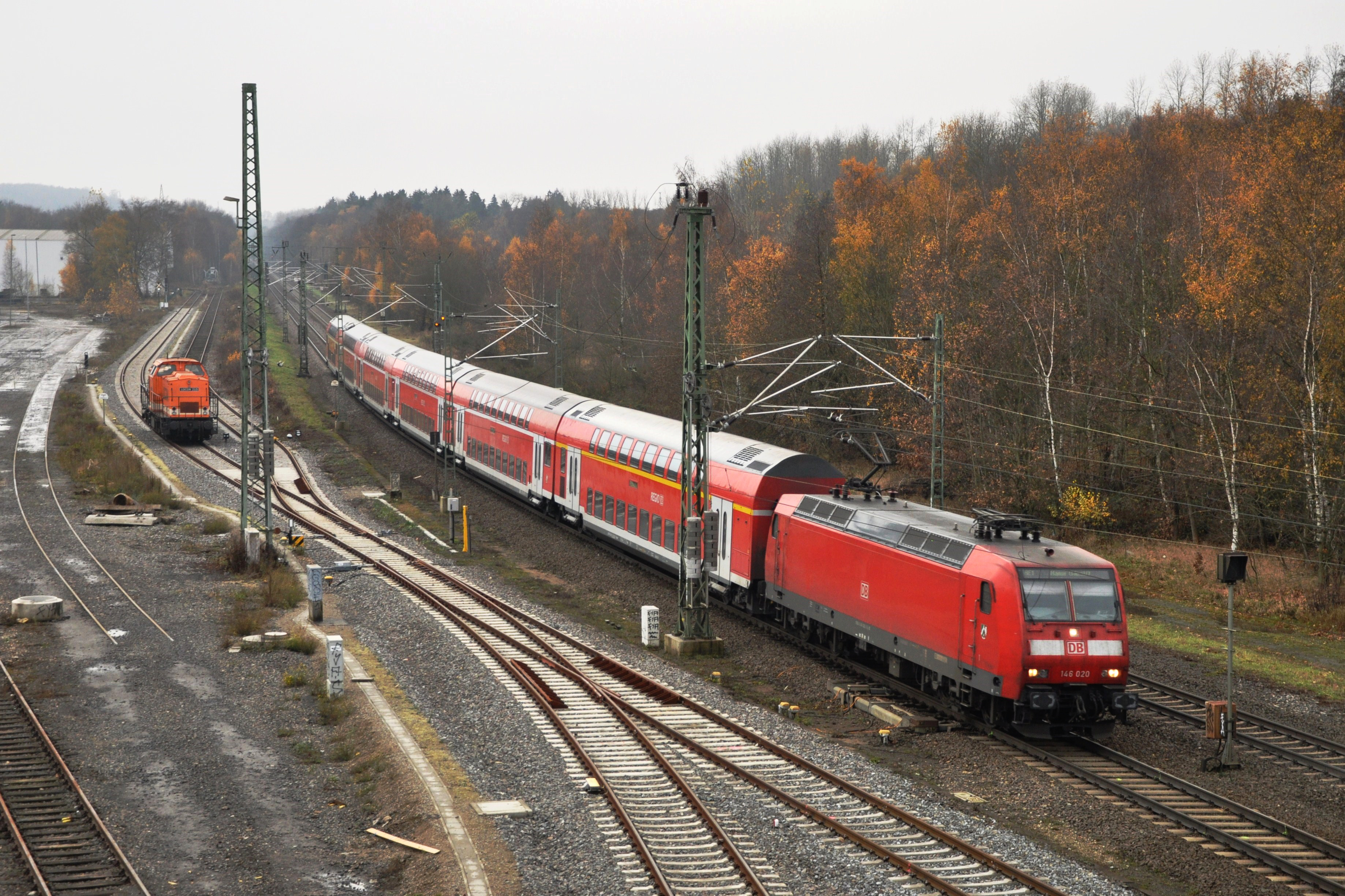
NRW-Express service in Stolberg Hbf

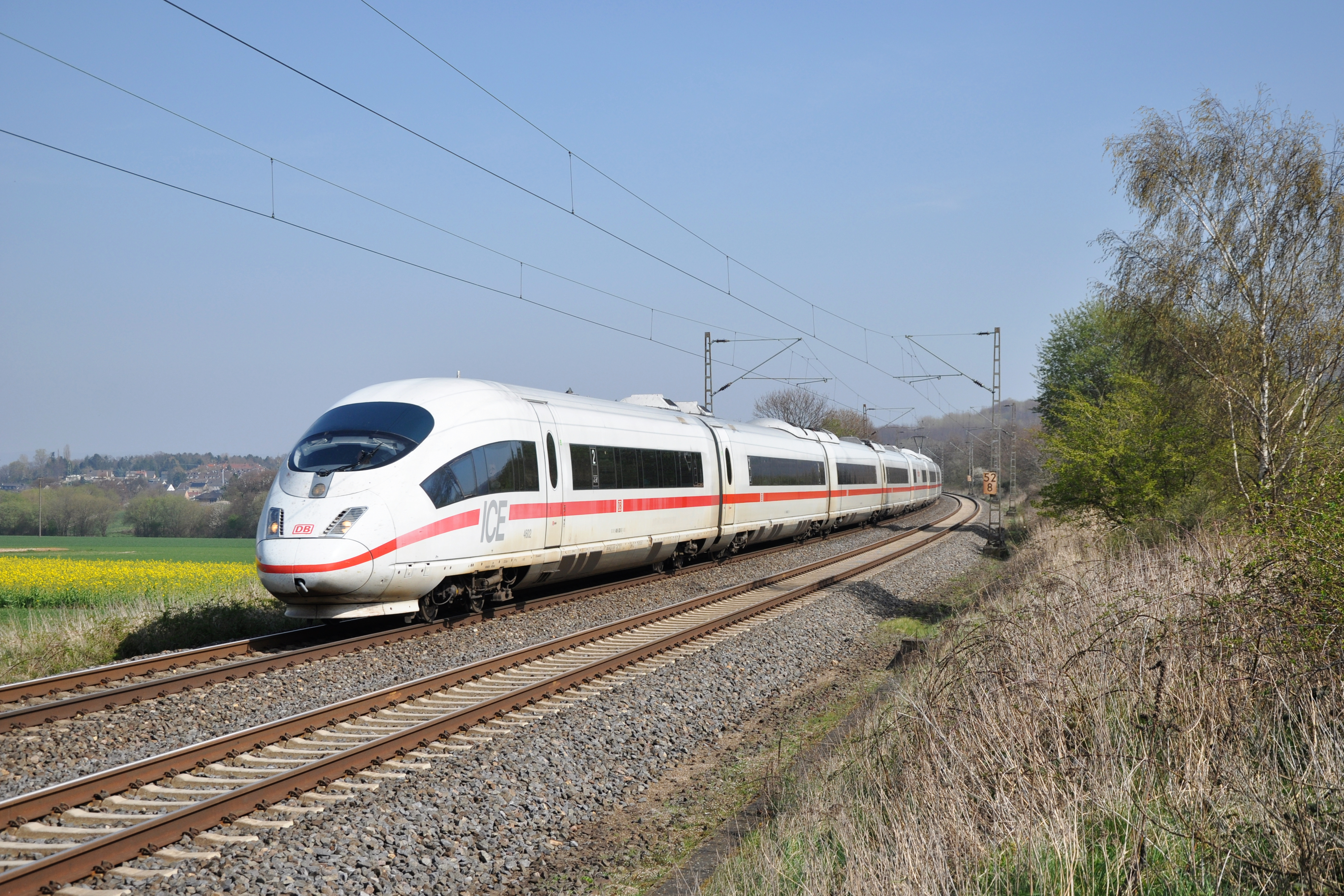
ICE International service near Nothberg

In long-distance traffic, the Cologne–Aachen high-speed line is operated with ICE International services using class 406 and 408 sets, and Eurostar services using PBKA sets. This offer is supplemented by individual Intercity and Intercity Express services that run once a week and thus create direct connections to/from other regions in Germany at the weekend.

The Regional-Express services RE 1 (NRW-Express) and RE 9 (Rhein-Sieg-Express) serve the entire length of the line hourly and together provide an approximately 30-minute cycle. The NRW-Express is operated with push–pull trains composed of double-deck carriages from Bombardier and class 146.0 locomotives. The Rhein-Sieg-Express is operated with locomotives of class 146.0 or class 111 as well as Talent 2 railcars in coupled sets. Class 120.2 locomotives were also used until 2018.

Between Cologne Hauptbahnhof and Köln-Ehrenfeld, the RE 8 regional express (Rhein-Erft-Express) service is operated with class 425 multiple units and the Regionalbahn RB 27 service (Rhein-Erft-Bahn) with push-pull trains consisting of three double-decker coaches and a locomotive of class 143. Between Cologne and Horrem, the Regionalbahn RB 38 service (Erft-Bahn) is operated with class 644 railcars and S-Bahn services S 13 and S 19 with class 423 multiple units. The S 12 service also runs between Cologne and Düren with class 423 sets.

Euregiobahn services on the section between Aachen Hauptbahnhof and Stolberg Hauptbahnhof are operated with Bombardier Talent DMUs every 30 minutes in coupled sets on weekdays and in single sets on Sundays. The Euregiobahn services leave the Cologne–Aachen line between Stolberg and Langerwehe and return to Langerwehe and Düren, running hourly.

==== Freight transport ====
The Cologne–Aachen high-speed line is used by numerous freight trains due to its location between the Köln-Eifeltor freight yard on the West Rhine railway and Aachen West, the eastern end of the Aachen–Tongeren railway. Much of the freight traffic is carried by DB Cargo and Cobra (Corridor Operations Belgium Rail), a subsidiary of Deutsche Bahn, and SNCB. Other regular services are a SBB Cargo Combined transport train hauled by TRAXX locomotives and freight trains operated by Crossrail (now part of Cargologic) and RTB Cargo, which uses diesel-hauled goods exchange trains (Übergabegüterzuge) from Düren to Stolberg and back. The line is also used by freight trains to and from Mönchengladbach on the section between the Cologne-Ehrenfeld and Köln-Müngersdorf Technologiepark stations.
