= Durchgangsgüterzug =

German train

A Durchgangsgüterzug (abbreviation: Dg, literally: through goods train) is a category of German train that describes a goods train that runs directly to its destination with the same train formation. No shunting takes place at intermediate stations and it is usually a unit train. In addition to transporting freight between marshalling yards, these trains are also used to move large quantities of bulk goods on set routes (e.g. coal and ore) from ports to power stations and steelworks.

Trains with only one type of freight are usually called unit trains or named after their freight e.g. coal train, oil train, etc.

== See also ==
- Nahgüterzug
- Übergabegüterzug
