= Nahgüterzug =

Local trains in Europe

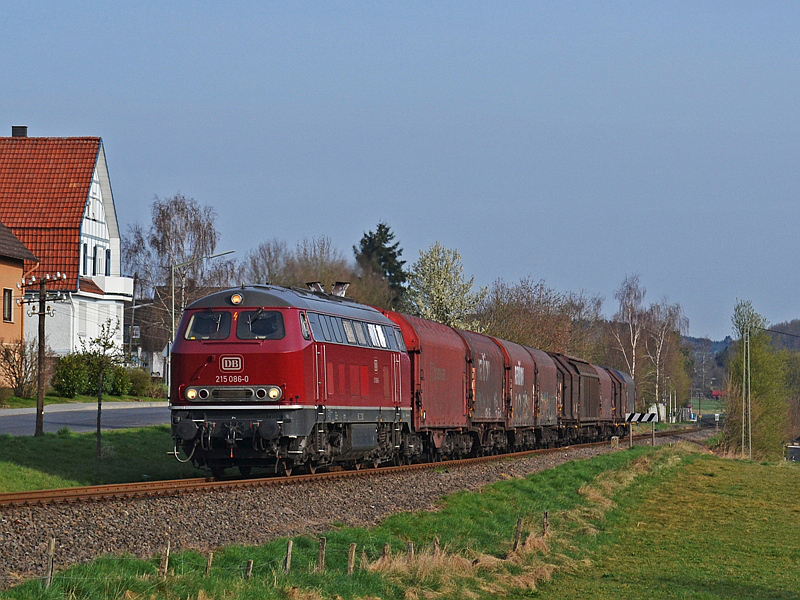
A Nahgüterzug at Obererbach

A Nahgüterzug (abbreviation: Ng) is the name given to a category of local goods train in German-speaking countries, sometimes translated as a 'pick up' train or pick-up goods train. It describes a type of goods train that, unlike the Durchgangsgüterzug (through goods train) - does not stay together for its entire journey; instead wagons can be added or dropped off at intermediate stations en route. And unlike the Übergabegüterzug (goods exchange train) Nahgüterzüge run from one railway hub to another, usually between two marshalling yards. Along the way various groups of wagons are detached or collected at the intermediate stations.

== See also ==
- Durchgangsgüterzug
- Übergabegüterzug
