= Übergabegüterzug =

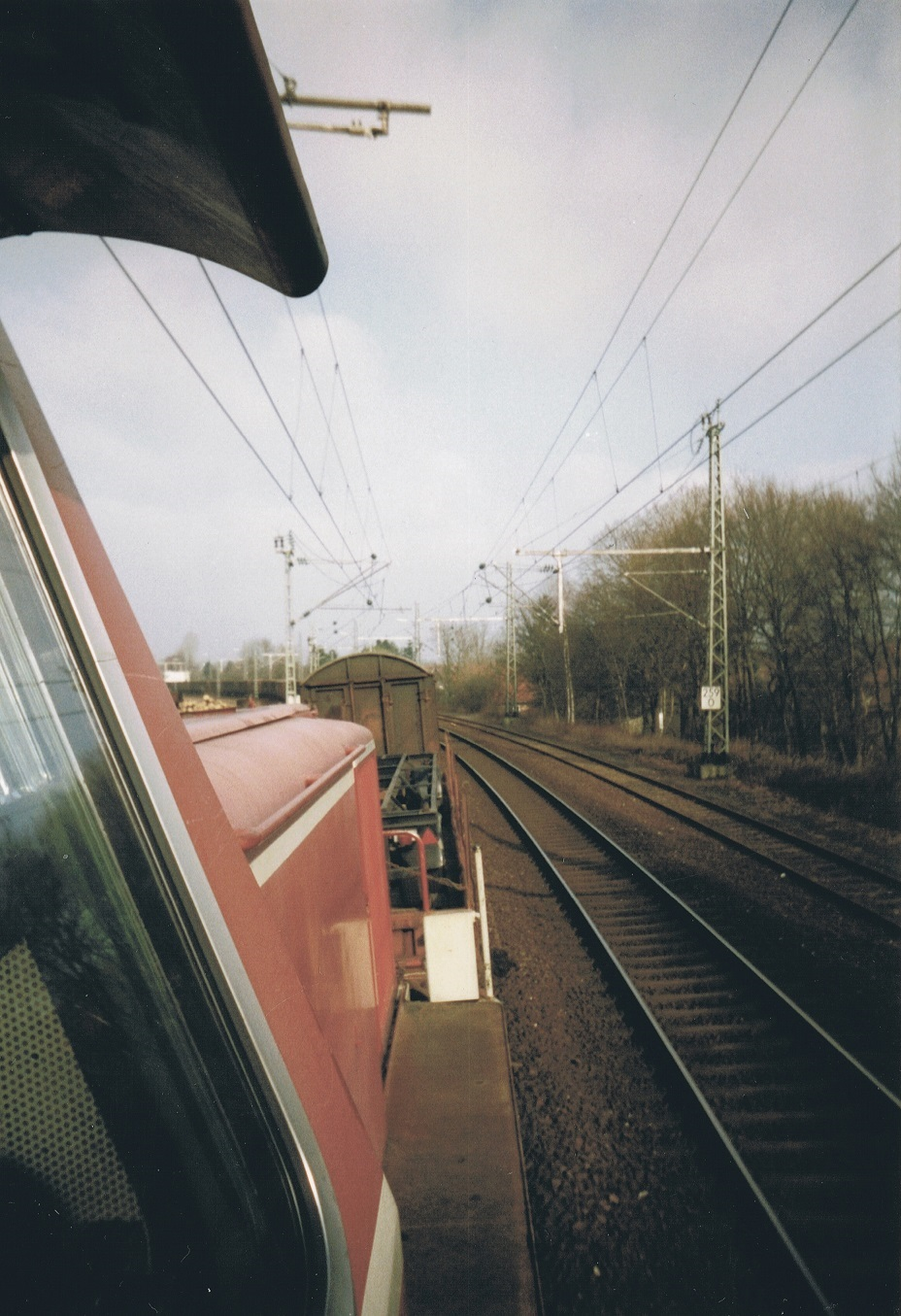
An Übergabegüterzug from Meppen in 1997, hauled by a DB Class 291

An Übergabegüterzug (abbreviated to: Üg or Übergabe, literally goods exchange train) is a goods train that moves individual goods wagons on the first or last stage of their journey i.e. from the start to the first railway hub or from the final railway hub to its destination. Between hubs the wagons are hauled by Nahgüterzüge (Ng), i.e. local goods trains, or Durchgangsgüterzüge (through goods trains). These trains generally cover relatively short distances and only have a few wagons that are delivered to and collected from industrial or loading sidings, either individually or in so-called wagon groups.

These days the classic categories of goods trains no longer really exist, rather the Deutsche Bahn's regional goods trains are more like a mixture of Üg and Ng trains. They are referred to by the DB as Cargobedienung (CB, i.e. cargo service) trains.

== See also ==
- Durchgangsgüterzug
- Nahgüterzug
