= Aachen West station =

Railway station in Aachen, Germany

Aachen West
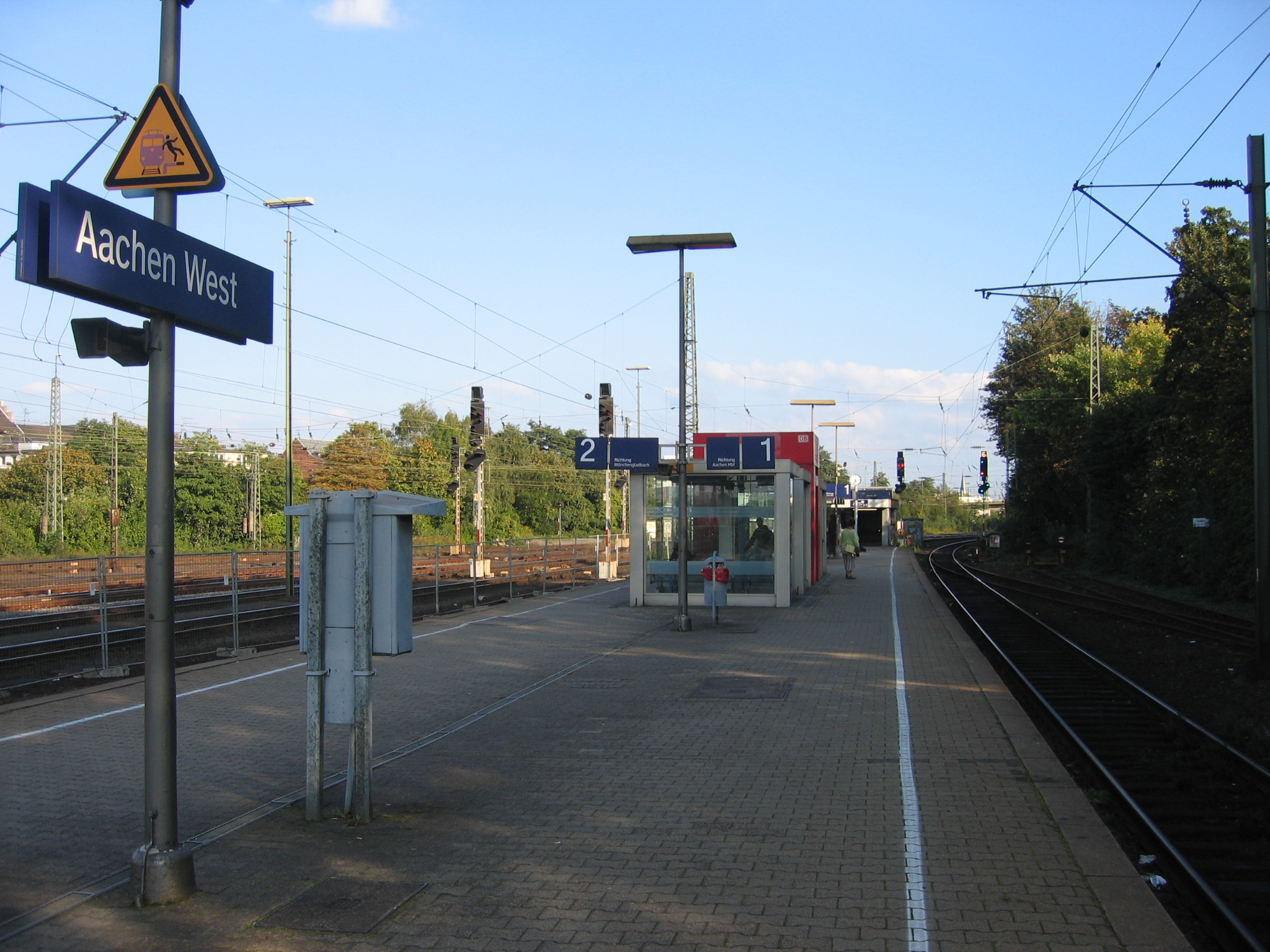
- Platform

General information
- Location: Republikplatz 1, Aachen, NRW; Germany
- Coordinates: 50°46′49″N 6°04′15″E
- Owner: DB Netz
- Operator: DB Station&Service
- Lines: Aachen–Mönchengladbach (D2550); Aachen West–Tongeren (D2552 L24); RE 4 (KBS 485); RE 18 (KBS 482); RB 20 (KBS 482); RB 33 (KBS 485)
- Platforms: 1

Construction
- Accessible: Yes

Other information
- Station code: 3
- DS100 code: KAW
- Category: 5
- Fare zone: AVV: Aachen City-XL-Zone; VRS: 3100 (AVV transitional tariff)
- Website: www.bahnhof.de

History
- Opened: 17 January 1853

Services
Preceding station	DB Regio NRW	Following station
Kohlscheid towards Heerlen or Alsdorf Poststraße	RB 20	Aachen Schanz towards Langerwehe/Düren or Stolberg Altstadt
Kohlscheid towards Essen Hbf	RB 33	Aachen Schanz towards Aachen Hbf
Preceding station	Arriva Netherlands	Following station
Herzogenrath towards Liège-Guillemins	RE 18; LIMAX; Drielandentrein; Dreiländerzug; Train des trois pays	Aachen Hbf Terminus
Preceding station	National Express Germany	Following station
Herzogenrath towards Dortmund Hbf	RE 4 (Wupper-Express)	Aachen Schanz towards Aachen Hbf
Location

Aachen West station is a railway station in Aachen on the railway lines Aachen – Mönchengladbach and Aachen-West – Tongeren.

== Passenger Services ==
All regional trains stop at this station, so it is usually served four times per hour and direction.

Line	Name	Route	
RE 4	Wupper-Express	Dortmund Hbf – Hagen Hbf – Wuppertal Hbf – Düsseldorf Hbf – Neuss Hbf – Mönchengladbach Hbf – Erkelenz – Herzogenrath – Aachen West – Aachen Hbf	
RE 18	LIMAX	Aachen Hbf – Aachen West – Herzogenrath – Eygelshoven Markt – Landgraaf – Heerlen – Valkenburg – Meerssen – Maastricht	
RB 20	Euregiobahn	Heerlen / Alsdorf Poststraße – Herzogenrath – Aachen West – Aachen Hbf – Aachen-Rothe Erde – Stolberg (Rheinl) Hbf (coupled/uncoupled)	– Stolberg Altstadt
RB 20	Euregiobahn	Heerlen / Alsdorf Poststraße – Herzogenrath – Aachen West – Aachen Hbf – Aachen-Rothe Erde – Stolberg (Rheinl) Hbf (coupled/uncoupled)	– Eschweiler-Tal – Langerwehe (– Düren)
RB 33	Rhein-Niers-Bahn	Essen – Mülheim – Duisburg – Krefeld Hbf – Mönchengladbach Hbf – Erkelenz – Geilenkirchen – Übach-Palenberg – Herzogenrath – Aachen West – Aachen Schanz – Aachen Hbf	

== Cargo Traffic ==
Aachen-West is an important junction for freight trains from Antwerp and Zeebrugge, changing locomotives here for their further journey east and/or south.
