= Kohlscheid station =

Railway station in Herzogenrath, Germany

Kohlscheid
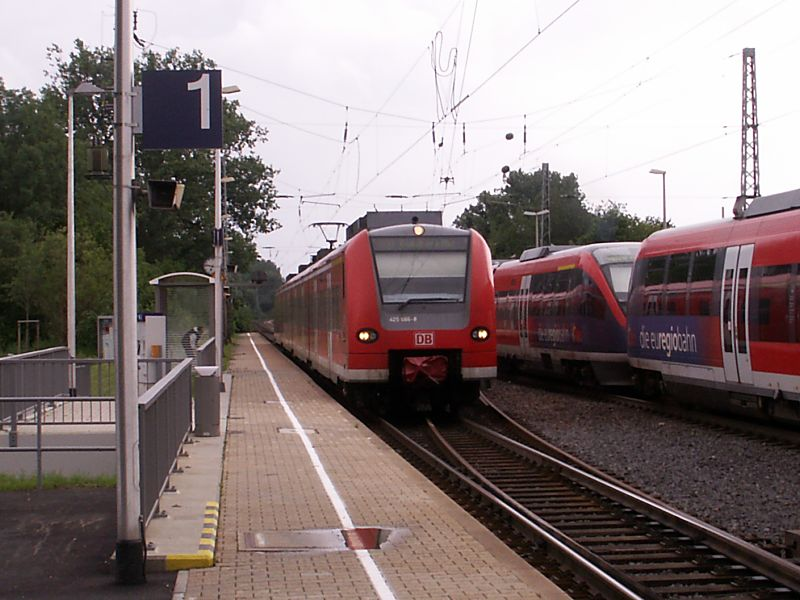

General information
- Location: Bahnhofstr. 1; 52134 Kohlscheid; Kohlscheid, NRW; Germany
- Coordinates: 50°49′54.9″N 6°4′28.6″E
- Lines: Aachen – Mönchengladbach (D2550) RB 20 (KBS 482) RB 33 (KBS 485)
- Platforms: 2

Construction
- Accessible: Yes

Other information
- Station code: 3309
- DS100 code: KKOS
- Category: 6
- Fare zone: AVV: Herzogenrath; VRS: 3120 (AVV transitional tariff)
- Website: www.bahnhof.de

History
- Opened: 17 January 1853

Services
Preceding station	DB Regio NRW	Following station
Herzogenrath towards Heerlen or Alsdorf Poststraße	RB 20	Aachen West towards Langerwehe/Düren or Stolberg Altstadt
Aachen West towards Aachen Hbf	RB 33	Herzogenrath towards Essen-Steele
Location

Kohlscheid (German: Bahnhof Kohlscheid) is a railway station in the town of Kohlscheid, North Rhine-Westphalia, Germany. The station lies on the Aachen–Mönchengladbach railway and the train services are operated by Deutsche Bahn, some under the name Euregiobahn.

== Train services ==
The station is served by the following services:

Line	Name	Route	
RB 20	Euregiobahn	Heerlen / Alsdorf Poststraße – Herzogenrath – Kohlscheid – Aachen Hbf – Aachen-Rothe Erde – Stolberg (Rheinl) Hbf (coupled/uncoupled)	– Stolberg Altstadt
RB 20	Euregiobahn	Heerlen / Alsdorf Poststraße – Herzogenrath – Kohlscheid – Aachen Hbf – Aachen-Rothe Erde – Stolberg (Rheinl) Hbf (coupled/uncoupled)	– Eschweiler-Tal – Langerwehe (– Düren)
RB 33	Rhein-Niers-Bahn	Essen – Mülheim – Duisburg – Krefeld Hbf – Mönchengladbach Hbf – Erkelenz – Geilenkirchen – Übach-Palenberg – Herzogenrath – Kohlscheid – Aachen West – Aachen Hbf	
