= Herzogenrath station =

Railway station in Herzogenrath, Germany

Herzogenrath
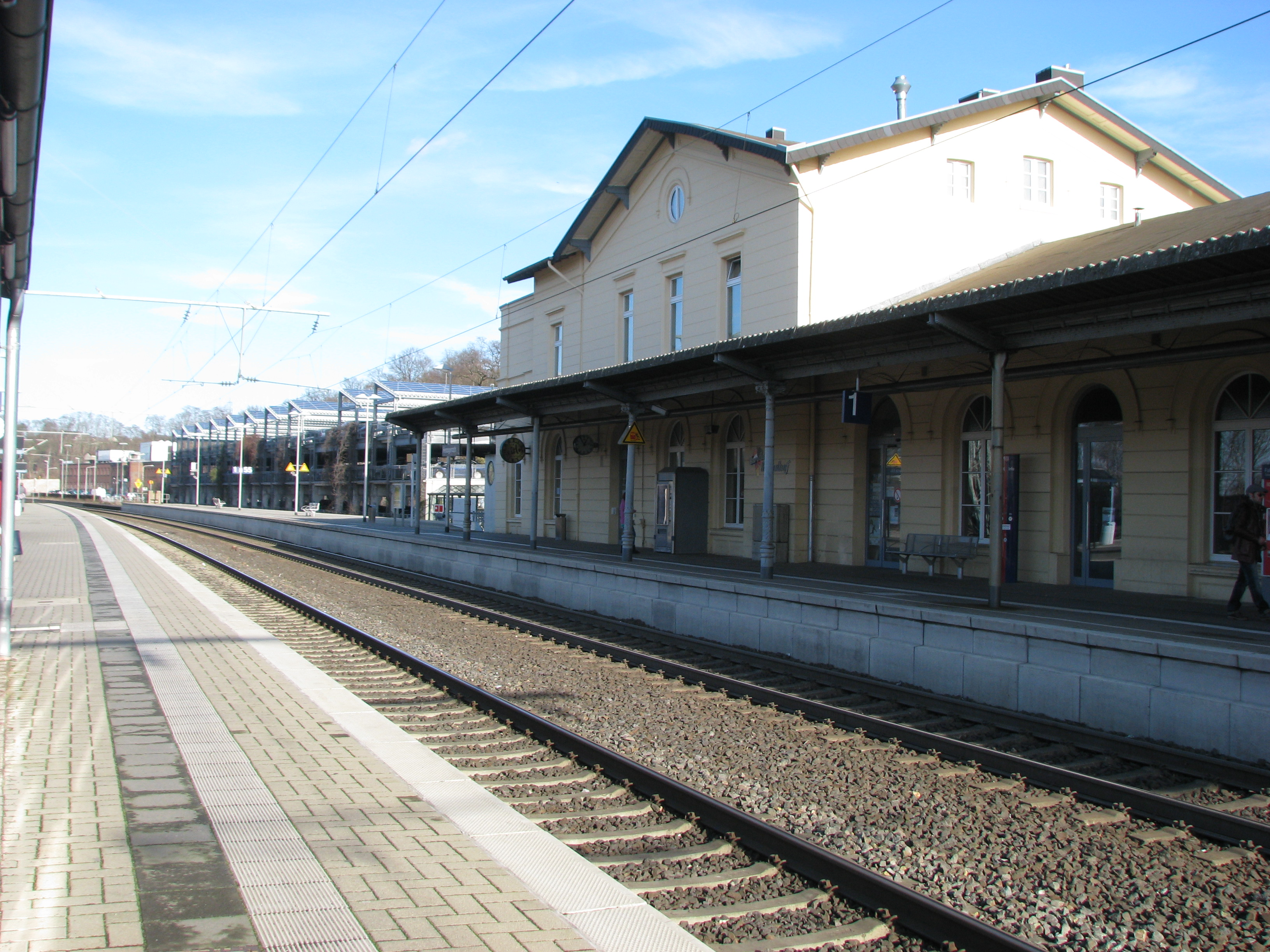
- Entrance building

General information
- Location: Bahnhofstr. 1, Herzogenrath, NRW; Germany
- Coordinates: 50°52′15″N 6°5′40.7″E
- Owner: DB Netz
- Operator: DB Station&Service
- Lines: Aachen–Mönchengladbach (KBS 485); Sittard–Herzogenrath; Stolberg–Herzogenrath (KBS 482)
- Platforms: 2 island platforms

Construction
- Accessible: Yes

Other information
- Station code: n/a
- DS100 code: KHEZ
- IBNR: 8002806
- Category: 3
- Fare zone: AVV: Herzogenrath; VRS: 3120 (AVV transitional tariff)
- Website: www.bahnhof.de

History
- Opened: 1852

Services
| Preceding station | DB Fernverkehr | Following station |
|---|---|---|
| Aachen Hbf Terminus | ICE 14 | Geilenkirchen towards Berlin Ostbahnhof |
| Preceding station | DB Regio NRW | Following station |
| Kohlscheid towards Heerlen or Alsdorf Poststraße | RB 20 | Eygelshoven Markt towards Heerlen |
| Kohlscheid towards Heerlen or Alsdorf Poststraße | RB 20 | Herzogenrath-Alt Merkstein towards Alsdorf-Annapark |
| Kohlscheid towards Aachen Hbf | RB 33 | Übach-Palenberg towards Essen-Steele |
| Preceding station | Arriva Netherlands | Following station |
| Eygelshoven Markt towards Liège-Guillemins | RE 18; LIMAX; Drielandentrein; Dreiländerzug; Train des trois pays | Aachen West towards Aachen Hbf |
| Preceding station | National Express Germany | Following station |
| Aachen West towards Aachen Hbf | RE 4 (Wupper-Express) | Übach-Palenberg towards Dortmund Hbf |
Location
- Location within North Rhine-Westphalia

Herzogenrath station is the most important railway station in the city of Herzogenrath, Städteregion Aachen, NRW, Germany. Here, the lines to Sittard via Landgraaf and Heerlen and to Stolberg, both part of the regional Euregiobahn network, branch from the main line from Aachen to Mönchengladbach. The station is in the area of the Aachen transport association (Aachener Verkehrsverbund, AVV) and linked to an adjacent bus station and a park-and-ride parking deck. For the RE 18 trains to Heerlen, this is the only stop in Germany.

== History ==
Herzogenrath was connected to the railway network in 1852, and the still-in-use station building was inaugurated one year later. 1857, a loading platform was constructed to load coal from the near Grube Anna in Alsdorf before a route to Stolberg via Alsdorf was opened in 1890. In this year, also a Rail yard started operation, but went defunct in 1950. 1892, the railway line to Heerlen in the Netherlands was opened.

In December 2004, the route to Stolberg was re-opened up to the Alsdorf-Annapark station, with new stops in Herzogenrath-Alt Merkstein and Herzogenrath-August-Schmidt-Platz. In 2007 and 2008, the platforms were reconstructed to a height of 76 cm, and in this process highly shortened, as only regional trains stopped here since the InterRegio service was discontinued. Also, lifts were built, so the station is now wheelchair accessible.

Since December 13, 2009, some InterCity-trains on the routes Aachen – Berlin and Leipzig – Cologne link Herzogenrath with the German long-distance train network again.

== Operational facilities ==
Four tracks of Herzogenrath stations are equipped with a platform, three of which are in daily use. The fourth one, track 55, is a dead end for trains to and from Alsdorf. Formerly, next to this track, other terminal tracks existed, but these were removed to build the parking deck. West of the platforms, there are several other tracks which today are used for stabling freight- and maintenance trains.

Herzogenrath is one of the few stations in the Aachen region that is not yet controlled by an electronic signalling centre. Since 1985, operation is regulated by a relay signal box of type SpDrS600 with the code Hf (where the f stands for Fahrdienstleiter, German for train dispatcher), at the northern end of the station. This signal box also controls the station of Kohlscheid, which is the following stop in direction Aachen. From 1915 to 1985, Herzogenrath station had a two mechanical signal boxes, besides Hf there was a second one, code Hs, at the southern end. The Hf signal box then was also responsible for the routes to Heerlen and Alsdorf.

== Services ==
All lines leaving Aachen in northern direction station stop at Herzogenrath. There are Regional-Express and Regionalbahn trains serving the station with a regular interval timetable, additionally, one InterCity long-distance train per day heading towards the German capital Berlin stops in Herzogenrath. The Euregiobahn line RB 20 split here until December 2016, each second train went to Heerlen, the other one to Alsdorf-Annapark. Since December 2016 and the completion of the so-called Ringbahn railway line between Herzogenrath and Stolberg, the RB 20 trains do not split up in Herzogenrath anymore but all run towards Alsdorf-Annapark. Vicariously, a new line called RE 18 was implemented.

| Line | Name | Route | |
|---|---|---|---|
| ICE 14 | ICE 1545: | (Aachen Hbf – Herzogenrath – Geilenkirchen – Rheydt Hbf – Mönchengladbach Hbf ( → Viersen) – Krefeld Hbf – Duisburg Hbf ( → Gelsenkirchen Hbf) – Dortmund Hbf – Hamm (Westf) Hbf – Gütersloh Hbf – Bielefeld Hbf – Herford – Hannover Hbf – Wolfsburg Hbf – Berlin-Spandau – Berlin Hauptbahnhof) | |
| ICE 14 | ICE 1548/1545: | Berlin to Aachen via Gelsenkirchen - Duisburg | |
| RE 4 | Wupper-Express | Aachen Hbf – Herzogenrath – Erkelenz – Mönchengladbach Hbf – Neuss Hbf – Düsseldorf Hbf – Wuppertal Hbf – Hagen Hbf – Dortmund Hbf | |
| RE 18 | LIMAX | Aachen Hbf – Aachen West – Herzogenrath – Eygelshoven Markt – Landgraaf – Heerlen – Valkenburg – Meerssen – Maastricht | |
| RB 20 | Euregiobahn | Eschweiler-St. Jöris – Alsdorf-Annapark – Herzogenrath – Aachen – Aachen-Rothe Erde – Stolberg (Rheinl) Hbf (coupled/uncoupled) | – Stolberg Altstadt |
| RB 20 | Euregiobahn | Eschweiler-St. Jöris – Alsdorf-Annapark – Herzogenrath – Aachen – Aachen-Rothe Erde – Stolberg (Rheinl) Hbf (coupled/uncoupled) | – Eschweiler-Tal – Langerwehe (– Düren) |
| RB 33 | Rhein-Niers-Bahn | Aachen Hbf – Aachen Schanz – Aachen West – Herzogenrath – Übach-Palenberg – Geilenkirchen – Erkelenz – Mönchengladbach Hbf – Krefeld Hbf – Duisburg – Mülheim – Essen | |
