= Aachen Schanz station =

Railway station in Aachen, Germany

Aachen Schanz
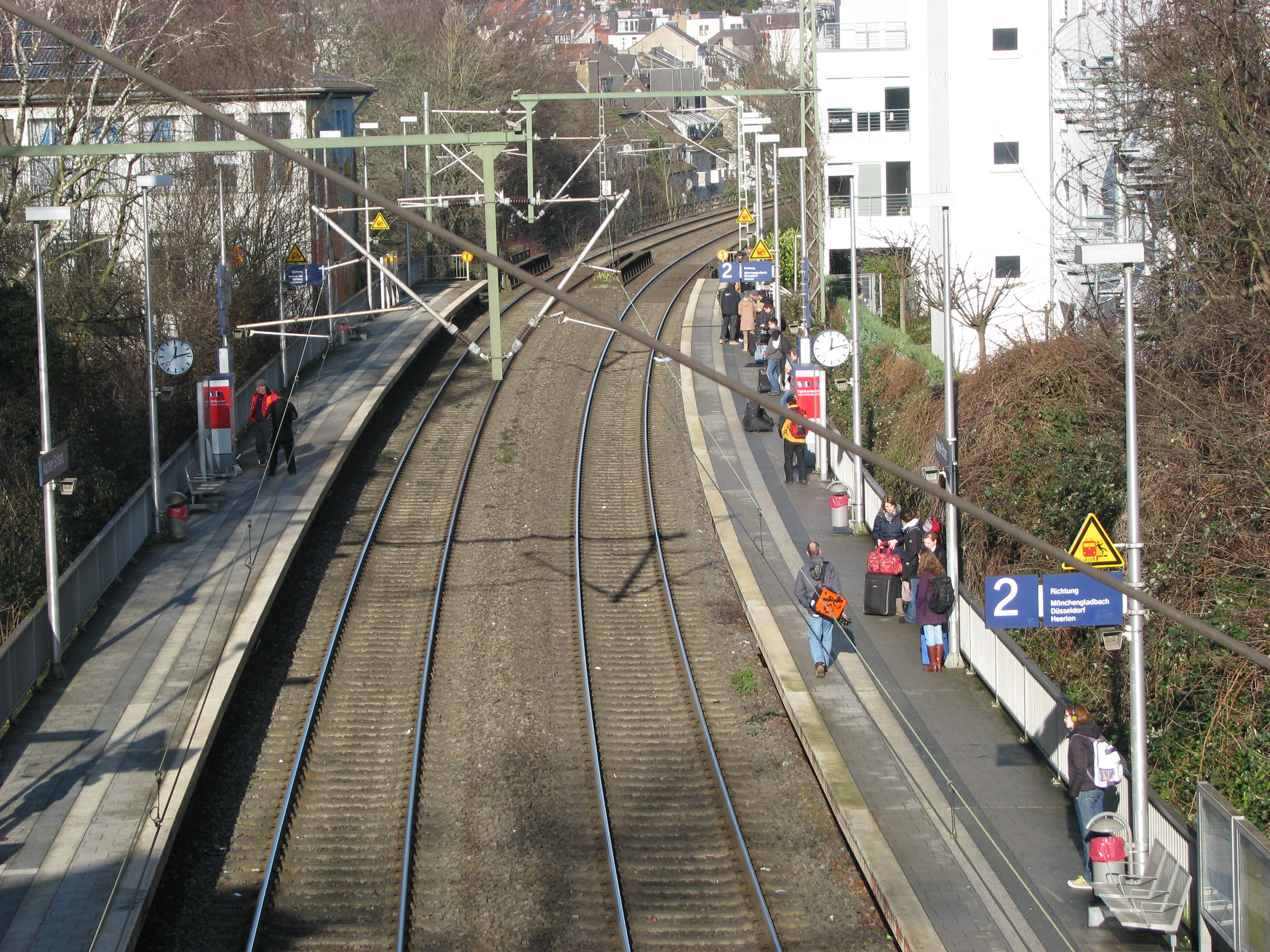
- Platform for northbound trains

General information
- Location: Vaalserstraße 15, Aachen, NRW; Germany
- Coordinates: 50°46′12″N 6°04′25″E
- Owner: DB Netz
- Operator: DB Station&Service
- Lines: Aachen – Mönchengladbach (D2550) RE 4 (KBS 485) RB 20 (KBS 482) RB 33 (KBS 485)
- Platforms: 2 side platforms
- Tracks: 2

Construction
- Accessible: Yes

Other information
- Station code: 7205
- DS100 code: KASZ
- Category: 5
- Fare zone: AVV: Aachen City-XL-Zone; VRS: 3100 (AVV transitional tariff)
- Website: www.bahnhof.de

History
- Opened: 13 June 2004

Services
Preceding station	National Express Germany	Following station
Aachen West towards Dortmund Hbf	RE 4 (Wupper-Express)	Aachen Hbf Terminus
Preceding station	DB Regio NRW	Following station
Aachen West towards Heerlen or Alsdorf Poststraße	RB 20	Aachen Hbf towards Langerwehe/Düren or Stolberg Altstadt
Aachen West towards Essen Hbf	RB 33	Aachen Hbf Terminus
Location

Aachen Schanz station is a railway station in Aachen, Germany on the railway line Aachen–Mönchengladbach. The station is located at the western end of the inner city, and is the station with the shortest walking distance to the historic center or the Aachen Cathedral. Several bus lines to western Aachen stop here, including regional buses to Kelmis and Maastricht and the medical centers of the city (Luisenhospital, Franziskushospital, Alexianerkrankenhaus and Klinikum Aachen). It is not a bus hub, but some lines stop at the southern end (Jakobstraße) and some at the northern end (Vaalser Straße), depending on the route of the line.

The accessible developed station lies between Aachen Central Station and Aachen West station at the west end of downtown.

== Services ==
All regional trains stop at this station; it is usually served four times per hour and direction.

Line	Name	Route	
RE 4	Wupper-Express	Dortmund – Hagen – Wuppertal – Düsseldorf – Neuss – Mönchengladbach – Erkelenz – Herzogenrath – Aachen Schanz – Aachen	
RB 20	Euregiobahn	Stolberg - Alsdorf Annapark – Herzogenrath – Aachen Schanz – Aachen – Aachen-Rothe Erde – Stolberg (coupled/uncoupled)	– Stolberg Altstadt
RB 20	Euregiobahn	Stolberg - Alsdorf Annapark – Herzogenrath – Aachen Schanz – Aachen – Aachen-Rothe Erde – Stolberg (coupled/uncoupled)	– Eschweiler-Tal – Langerwehe (– Düren)
RB 33	Rhein-Niers-Bahn	Aachen Hbf – Aachen Schanz – Aachen West – Herzogenrath – Geilenkirchen – Lindern (coupled/uncoupled)	– Erkelenz –Mönchengladbach – Krefeld – Duisburg – Essen
RB 33	Rhein-Niers-Bahn	Aachen Hbf – Aachen Schanz – Aachen West – Herzogenrath – Geilenkirchen – Lindern (coupled/uncoupled)	– Heinsberg
