= Ten Esschen (hamlet) =

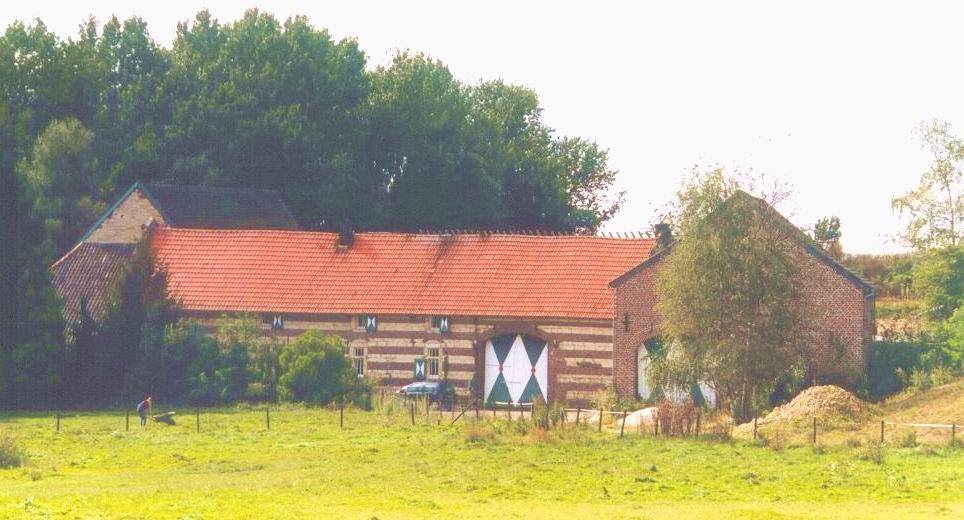
- Manor at Ten Esschen
- Interactive map of Ten Esschen
- Coordinates: 50°54′00″N 5°56′00″E
- Country: Netherlands
- Province: Limburg
- Municipality: Heerlen

Area
  - Total: 1.98 km^{2} (0.76 sq mi)
- Elevation: 109 m (358 ft)

Population (2021)
  - Total: 155
  - Density: 78.3/km^{2} (203/sq mi)
- Time zone: UTC+1 (CET)
  - Summer (DST): UTC+2 (CEST)
- Postal code: 6412
- Dialing code: 045

Ten Esschen (Limburgish: Genessche) is a Dutch hamlet located in the commune of Heerlen, in the province of Dutch Limburg.

The village lies between the A76 and N281 motorways. It also borders the Sittard–Herzogenrath railway.

== Gallery ==
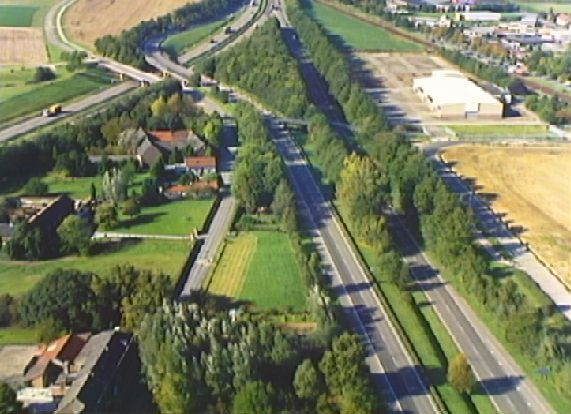
Aerial view of Ten Esschen, between the A76 and N281 highways. On the top right is the railroad.
