= EGH =

EGH may refer to:

- Ecobank Ghana, a commercial bank
- Egg Harbor City station, a train station in New Jersey, United States
- Egham railway station, in England
- Eygelshoven railway station, in the Netherlands
- Elder of the Order of the Golden Heart of Kenya
