= Landgraaf railway station =

Railway station in the Netherlands

Landgraaf
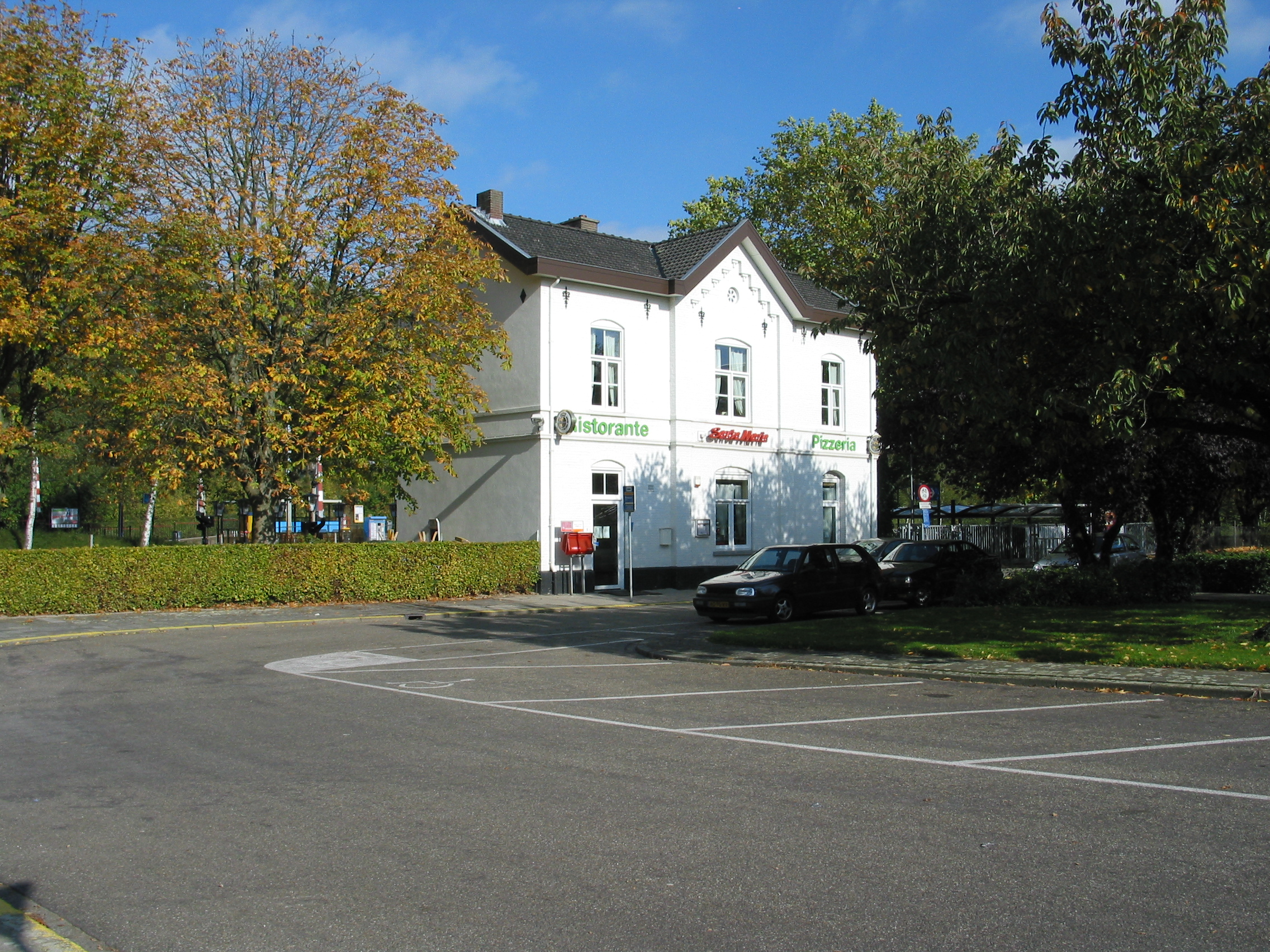

General information
- Location: Netherlands
- Coordinates: 50°53′47″N 6°01′12″E
- Lines: Sittard–Herzogenrath railway Schaesberg–Simpelveld railway
- Platforms: 3

Other information
- Station code: Lg

History
- Opened: 1 May 1896

Services
Preceding station	Arriva Netherlands	Following station
Heerlen De Kissel towards Sittard	Stoptrein 32500	Eygelshoven towards Kerkrade Centrum
Heerlen towards Liège-Guillemins	RE 18; LIMAX; Drielandentrein; Dreiländerzug; Train des trois pays	Eygelshoven Markt towards Aachen Hbf
Location
- Location within Netherlands

Landgraaf is a railway station in Landgraaf, Netherlands, situated near the district Schaesberg. Before 1986, it was called Schaesberg. The station was opened on 1 May 1896 and is located on the Sittard–Herzogenrath railway and the Heuvellandlijn (Maastricht–Kerkrade). Services are operated by Arriva and Deutsche Bahn.

== Train services ==
The following train services call at this station:

- Express RE 18: Aachen–Maastricht
- Local Stoptrein: Sittard–Heerlen–Kerkrade
