= Aachen–Mönchengladbach railway =

Railway line in North Rhine-Westphalia, Germany

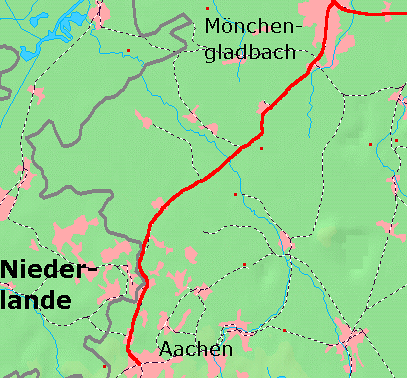

Overview
- Line number: 2550
- Locale: North Rhine-Westphalia, Germany

Service
- Route number: 425, 485

Technical
- Line length: 62 km (39 mi)
- Track gauge: 1,435 mm (4 ft 8 1/2 in) standard gauge
- Electrification: 15 kV/16.7 Hz AC catenary

The Aachen–Mönchengladbach railway is a main line in the German state of North Rhine-Westphalia. It is an important link between the Ruhr and Belgium for freight trains and is served by regional passenger trains. The line was built by the Aachen-Düsseldorf-Ruhrort Railway Company and is one of the oldest lines in Germany, which was opened between 1852 and 1854.

== Route ==
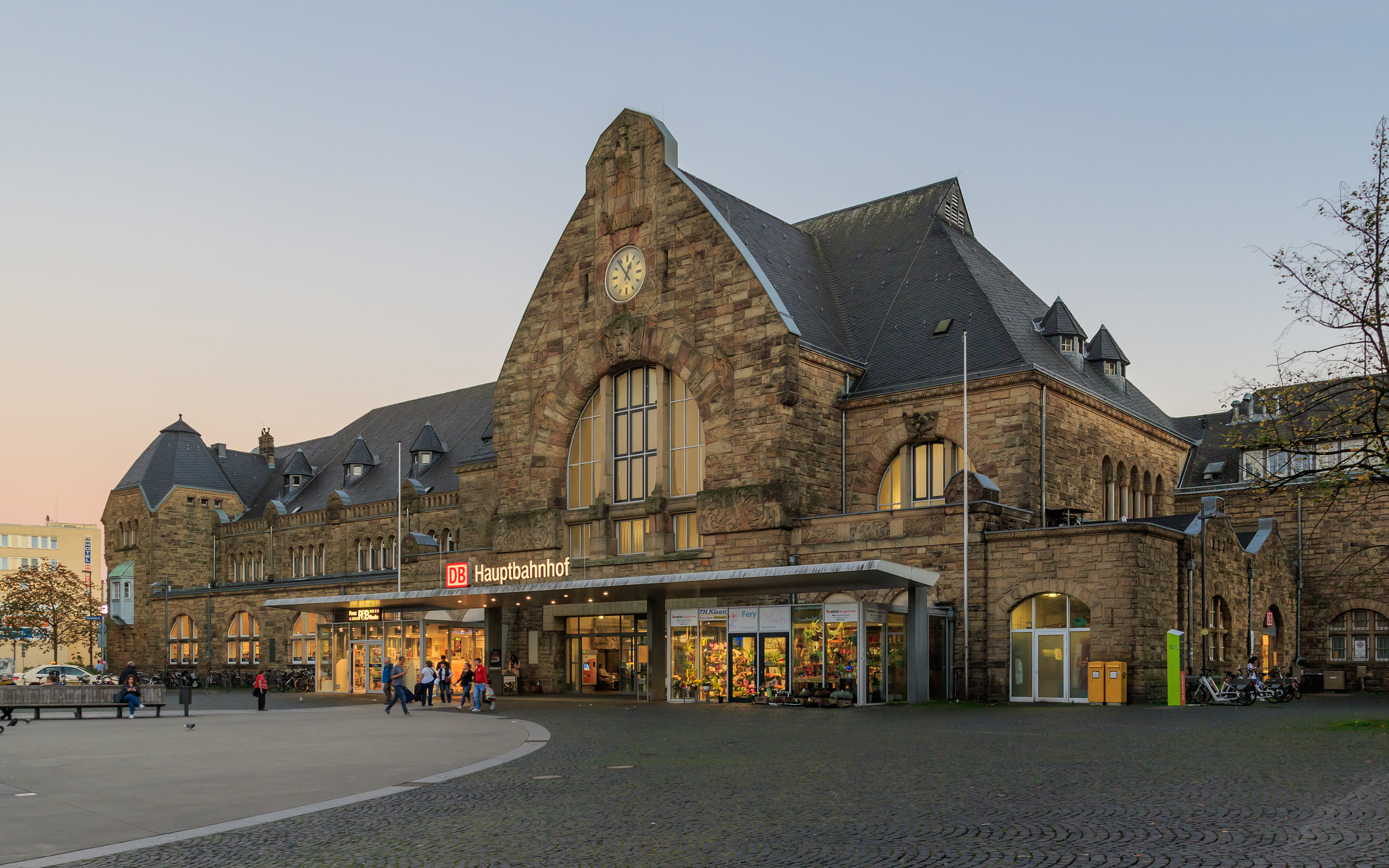
Aachen Hauptbahnhof

The line begins in Aachen Hauptbahnhof, where it connects with the line from Liège, Belgium and with the line to Cologne. Shortly later is the Aachen Schanz station, opened in 2004. On the approach to Aachen West station is the junction with the Montzen Railway, which is exclusively used for freight trains to and from Belgium.

The track runs on a high embankment through western Aachen and then through a deep cutting, which used to be the location of Richterich station, but is now a crossover only. In Richterich station there used to junction with the so-called Millions line (Millionen linie) to Simpelveld in the Netherlands. The line runs to Kohlscheid station, which is at the top of the Kohlscheid ramp. Bank engines were once needed to push heavy trains towards Aachen up the steep grade from Herzogenrath to Kohlscheid. It was also the starting point for the now almost completely dismantled Stolberg–Kohlscheid line to Würselen.

In Herzogenrath there are junctions with the Stolberg–Herzogenrath line and the line to Heerlen in the Netherlands, which is served by the cross-border operator, euregiobahn. There is also a connection in Herzogenrath to the Saint-Gobain glass factory.

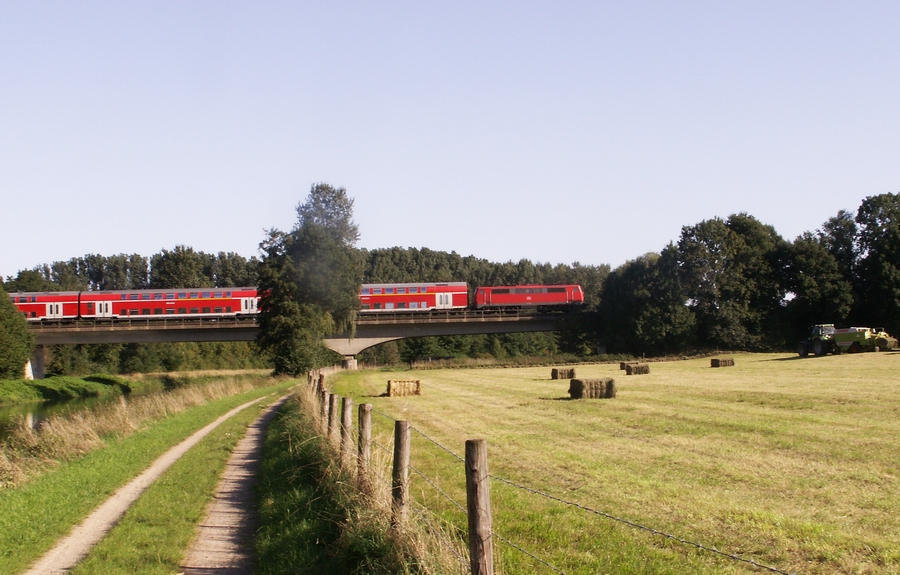
Wupper-Express on the Rur bridge

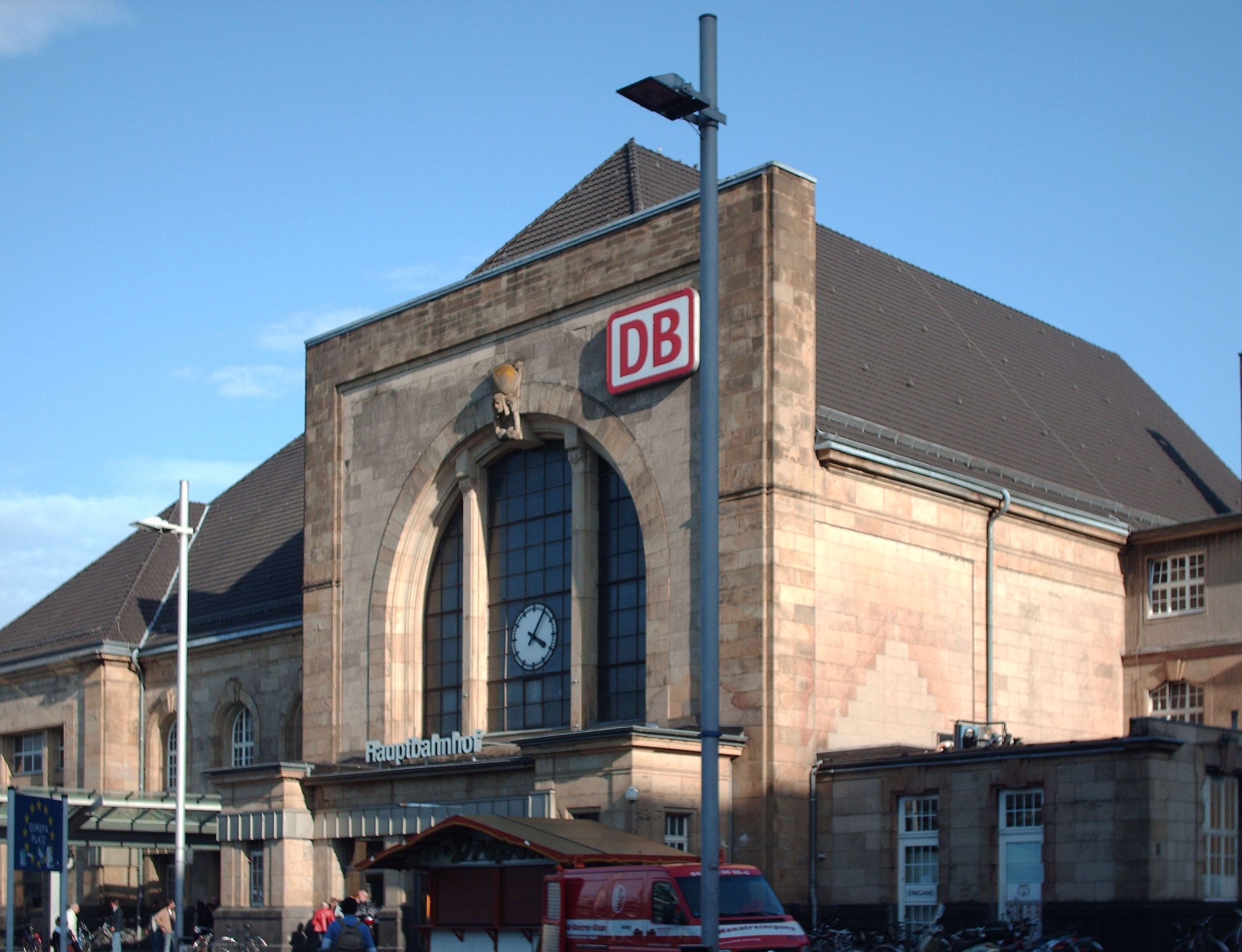
Mönchengladbach Hauptbahnhof

The line runs through Übach-Palenberg halt and Geilenkirchen station, which once connected to the metre-gauge Geilenkirchen District Railway to Tüddern and Alsdorf. Currently, the standard gauge rail link of the power company, WestEnergie und Verkehr GmbH is the only remnant of the district railway era. The terrain becomes flat in Lindern, where there is a connection with the branch line to the city of Heinsberg. The Lindern–Brachelen–Baal section of the line is on a high embankment across the low plain of the Rur river, which is crossed by a concrete bridge.

The next junction is at Baal, which between 1911 and 1980 was a “tower station” (Turmbahnhof), that is a two-level station, where the now largely closed Jülich–Dalheim line crossed on the lower level, while the platforms of the Aachen–Mönchengladbach line were on the upper level. After Baal station the line crosses the largely rural country known as the Erkelenzer Börde (Westphalian for "fertile lowlands").

In the former Rheydt freight yard, the now closed Krefeld–Rheydt line and the current Moenchengladbach freight bypass branch off. The latter allows freight trains to avoid the busy section between Rheydt Hauptbahnhof and Mönchengladbach Hauptbahnhof and run to Viersen-Helenabrunn station on the Mönchengladbach–Duisburg line. There is also a parking area for trains running to the Siemens test and validation centre at Wegberg-Wildenrath.

Between the freight yard and Rheydt Hauptbahnhof, the Iron Rhine from Wegberg runs as a single track, parallel with the Aachen–Mönchengladbach line. The lines from Cologne and Wegberg end in Rheydt Hauptbahnhof.

The combination of these lines in Rheydt leads to dense traffic of the last section of the line to Mönchengladbach Hauptbahnhof. From there lines run to Duisburg and to Düsseldorf.

== History ==
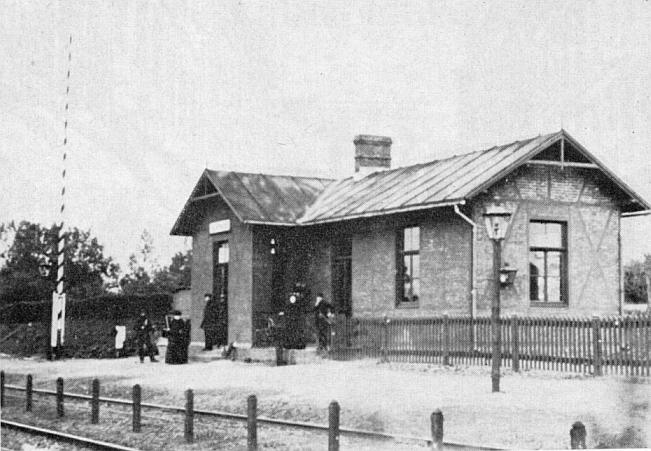
Palenberg station in 1900

The planning for the construction of the route was initially carried out by the Aachen-Neuß-Düsseldorf Railway Company (German: Aachen-Neuß-Düsseldorfer Eisenbahn-Gesellschaft), which on 21 August 1846 was granted a concession by the Prussian government for the construction of the Aachen–Neuss–Düsseldorf-Oberkassel line. The company got into financial difficulties as construction started. At the same time the Ruhrort-Crefeld District Gladbach Railway Company (Ruhrort–Crefeld−Kreis Gladbach Eisenbahngesellschaft) also became unfinancial. At their own request both companies were taken over in 1850 as the Royal Division of the Aachen-Düsseldorf-Ruhrort Railway Company (Königliche Direction der Aachen-Düsseldorf-Ruhrorter Eisenbahn), although this was also a limited company.

The route was opened in the following sections:

Section	Distance	Opening
Mönchengladbach–Rheydt	3.8	12 August 1852
Rheydt–Herzogenrath	44.0	12 November 1852
Herzogenrath–Aachen	13.2	17 January 1853

The Aachen-Düsseldorf-Ruhrort Railway Company was the operator of the line from 1854 until 31 December 1865. On 1 January 1866 the company’s assets were taken by the Bergisch-Märkische Railway Company (Bergisch-Märkische Eisenbahn-Gesellschaft, BME), which was mainly owned by the Prussian government.

=== New route in Aachen ===
Originally, the line began at Aachen Marschierthor station, near the Marschiertor gate. This is now the location of a rail depot established in 1905 when the Aachen Hauptbahnhof was built to replace the former Aachen Rhenish Station and the Marschierthor station. In 1910, Aachen Templerbend station was demolished and replaced by Aachen West station on a relocated section of track. The old line through Templerbend station ran through western Aachen from the current junction with the Montzen Railway to the northeast directly to the former Richterich station.

=== Modernisation in 2007 ===
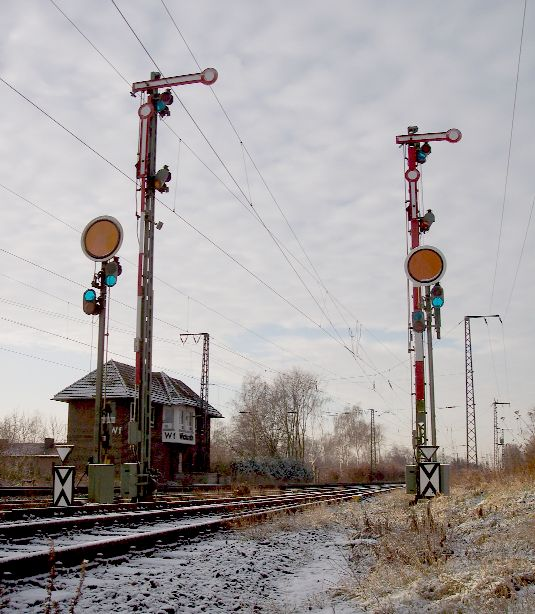
Semaphore signals in Wickrath station

In 2007 the track between Übach-Palenberg and Rheydt Hauptbahnhof was connected to an electronic interlocking at Grevenbroich. In 2006 and 2007, new Ks signals replaced the last semaphore signals on the track in Lindern station and between Herrath and Rheydt Hauptbahnhof. The stations at Wickrath, Übach-Palenberg and Erkelenz were renovated. In 2007, a new electronic interlocking was installed in Aachen Hauptbahnhof and the old colour light signals were also replaced by Ks signals.

== Current operations ==
Regional services on the line are operated by DB Regio NRW. The hourly Wupper-Express (RE 4) Regional-Express service and the hourly Rhein-Niers-Bahn (RB 33) Regionalbahn service run on the line. The Regionalbahn service stops at all stations, while the Regional-Express stops at all stops except Kohlscheid, Brachelen, Herrath and Wickrath. From Mönchengladbach these trains continue on two different routes (RB 33 via the Duisburg-Ruhrort–Mönchengladbach line to Duisburg and RE 4 via the Mönchengladbach–Düsseldorf line to Düsseldorf, Wuppertal, Hagen and Dortmund).

It is served by Intercity services twice a week running between Aachen and Berlin, stopping at Mönchengladbach, Rheydt, Herzogenrath and Aachen.

In freight transport, the line is currently used as an alternative to the Iron Rhine. Trains running from Belgium via the Montzen Railway to the Ruhr run on the Aachen–Mönchengladbach line from Aachen West station at least as far as Rheydt freight yard. They continue either via the Mönchengladbach freight rail bypass or via Mönchengladbach Hbf to Duisburg.

== Sources ==
- Höpfner, Hans-Paul (1986). Eisenbahnen. Ihre Geschichte am Niederrhein (in German). Duisburg: Mercator Verlag. ISBN 3-87463-132-X.
- Schweers, Hans; Wall, Henning (1993). Eisenbahnen rund um Aachen (in German) (1 ed.). Aachen. ISBN 3-921679-91-5.
