= Eygelshoven railway station =

Railway station in the Netherlands

Eygelshoven
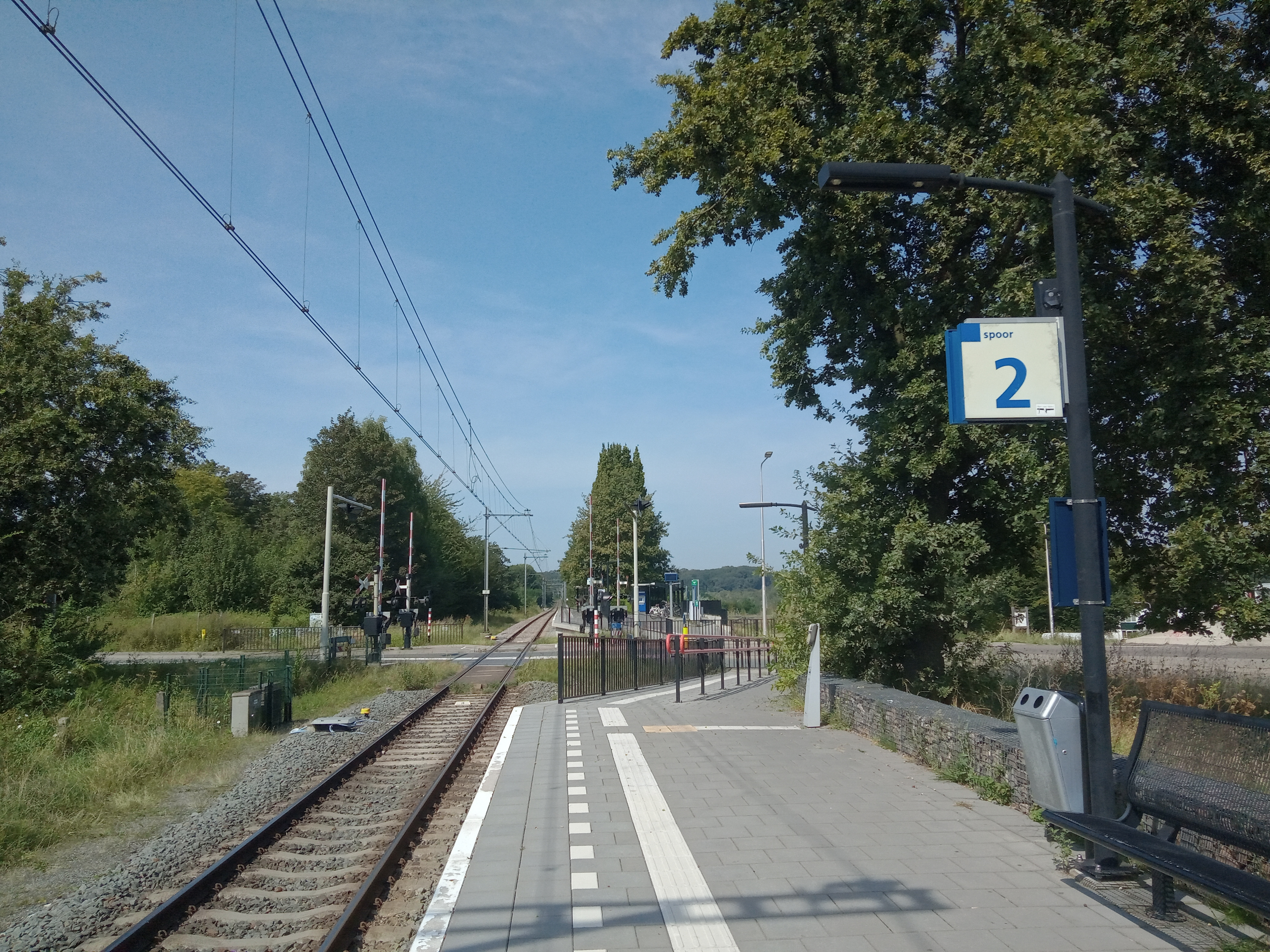
- Platform 2 of Eygelshoven train station, with platform 1 visible on the other side of the railway crossing.

General information
- Location: Netherlands
- Coordinates: 50°53′25″N 6°02′44″E
- Line: Schaesberg–Simpelveld railway

Other information
- Station code: Egh

History
- Opened: 15 May 1949

Services
Preceding station	Arriva Netherlands	Following station
Landgraaf towards Sittard	Stoptrein 32500	Chevremont towards Kerkrade Centrum
Location
- Location within Netherlands

Eygelshoven station is a railway station southwest of Eygelshoven, the Netherlands. It is located on the Schaesberg–Simpelveld railway, which is part of the Heuvellandlijn (Maastricht–Kerkrade). Train services are operated by Arriva.

== History ==
Initially called Hopel station, the first train arrived at the station on 12 May 1949, while passenger services commenced on 15 May 1949. The station was renamed to Eygelshoven on 22 May 1966.

== Train services ==
The following local train services call at this station:

- Stoptrein: Sittard–Heerlen–Kerkrade

== See also ==
- Eygelshoven Markt railway station, located north of the same town
