= Chevremont railway station =

Railway station in the Netherlands

Chevremont
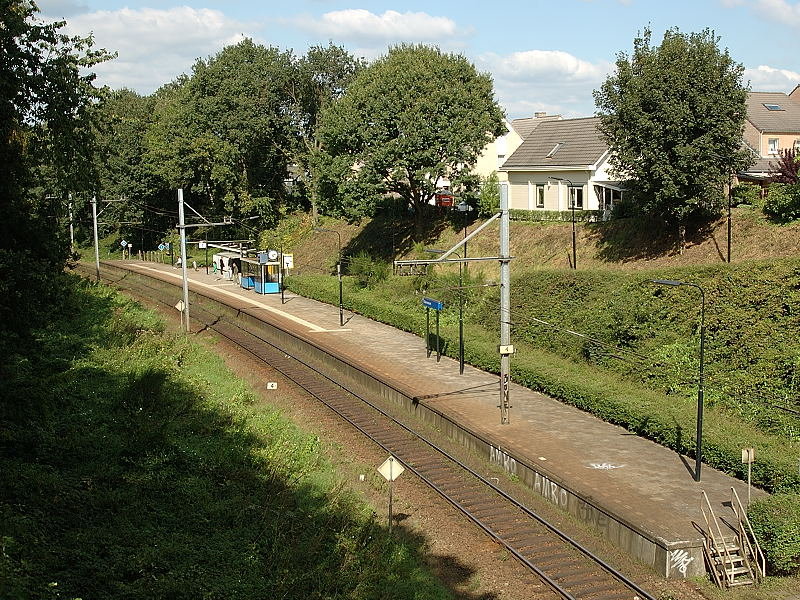

General information
- Location: Netherlands
- Coordinates: 50°52′33″N 6°03′34″E
- Line: Schaesberg–Simpelveld railway

History
- Opened: 15 May 1949

Services
Preceding station	Arriva Netherlands	Following station
Eygelshoven towards Sittard	Stoptrein 32500	Kerkrade Centrum Terminus
Location
- Location within Netherlands

Chevremont railway station is located in Kerkrade, Netherlands. The railway station opened on 15 May 1949 on the Schaesberg–Simpelveld railway, a part osf the Heuvellandlijn (Maastricht–Kerkrade). Train services are operated by Arriva.

== Train services ==
The following local train services call at this station:

- Stoptrein: Sittard–Heerlen–Kerkrade

== Platform ==
There is one platform where trains in both directions depart.
