= Richterich =

- Borough of Aachen
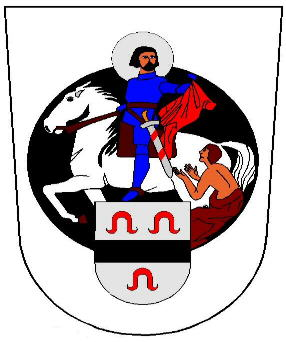
- Coat of arms
- Interactive map of Richterich
- Location within Germany Location within North Rhine-Westphalia
- Coordinates: 50°48′31″N 6°3′45″E
- Country: Germany
- State: North Rhine-Westphalia
- District: Urban district
- City: Aachen

Area
  - Total: 13.18 km^{2} (5.09 sq mi)
- Elevation: 186 m (610 ft)

Population (2020-12-31)
  - Total: 8,590
  - Density: 652/km^{2} (1,690/sq mi)
- Time zone: UTC+01:00 (CET)
  - Summer (DST): UTC+02:00 (CEST)
- Dialling codes: 0241

Richterich (German pronunciation: [ˈʁɪçtəʁɪç]) is a borough and northwestern suburb of Aachen, Germany. The towns of Horbach and Huf belong to the borough, which borders the other Aachen borough of Laurensberg, as well as the Kohlscheid borough of Herzogenrath. It is assumed that the histories of Richerich and Horbach go back a long time, since the name is suggestive of a Celtic settlement. In Roman times, the attested name of the area was recteriacum.

== Buildings and history ==
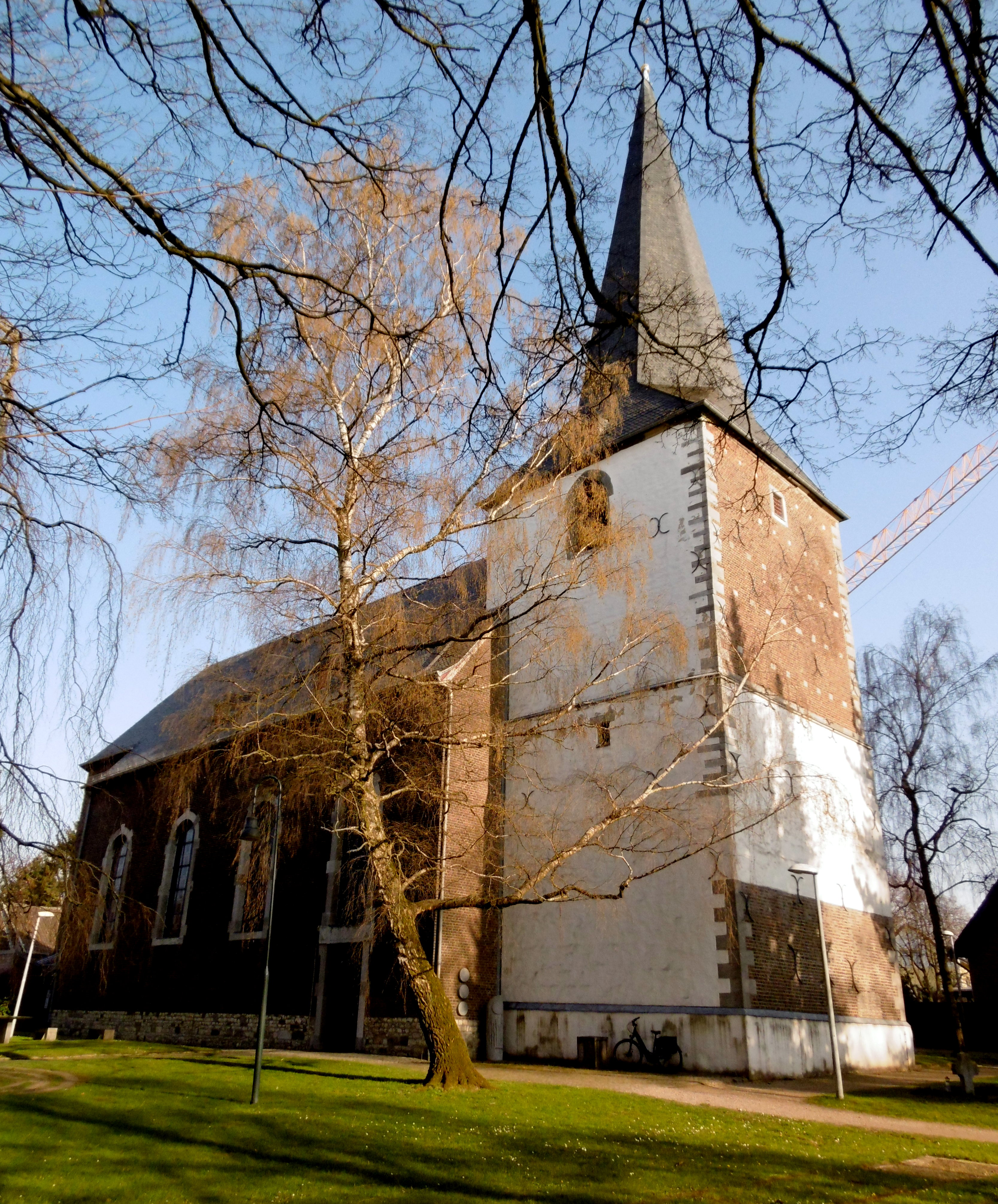
St. Martin Church in Richterich

The most historically important buildings in the borough are the St. Martin Church (inaugurated 1791), the Schönau Castle (Schloss Schönau), and the water fortress Heyden House (Haus Heyden), in Horbach. St. Martin Church contains the Maaß Organ, which was built in 1836 and is the oldest organ in Aachen. Schönau Castle is today home to a restaurant and is available to residents as a cultural center and host to various events. Heyden House is now used for residential purposes. Besides a few houses from the 18th century in the old village, there are several well-preserved old estates, such as the Gut Bau (built in 1750) and the Zehnthof, which is where farmers tithed what they owed during the Middle Ages. From 1911 until 1927 the Carl Friedrich mine was the most southerly mine of Aachen’s Wurmrevier coal region. The workforce consisted of about 500 people, but the mine was shut down after only 16 years, due to unfavorable tectonic conditions and poor coal quality.

=== Incorporation ===
On 1 January 1972, Richterich was incorporated into Aachen. A section of the community (which included Bank and Wilsberg and contained 1119 residents) was split off and merged with Herzogenrath.

== Transportation ==
Richterich formerly had its own train station on the Aachen–Mönchengladbach line, with a branch line to Vetschau. Passenger traffic at this station was discontinued in 1966. In 1992, the track to Simpelveld shut down entirely, and several hundred meters of track were removed in Vetschau.

== Schools ==
There are two elementary schools in the district of Richterich: the GGS Richterich and the KGS Horbach. Also in Richterich are four preschools: the city-run preschools of Park Street (Parkstraße), Richterich Street (Richtericher Straße), and Green Valley Street (Grünenthaler Straße), as well as the Catholic preschool at St. Martin, which has had a cooperative agreement with RWTH Aachen University since 2005.

== Sports and leisure ==
In Richterich, there are several sports clubs, including Rhenania Richterich, the Sports Club Horbach 1919, the Gymnastics Club Richterich 1885, the Fishing Club Richterich and the Fishing Club Horbach. There are also two Carnival Clubs (the 1st Carnival Club Koe Jonge Richterich 1956 and the Carnival Club Friends of Horbach 1998), a shooting club (the St. Hubert Shooting Brotherhood Richterich 1816), and the Instrumental Club Richterich 1887. A voluntary Fire Company—the Löschzug Richterich—has also existed since 1901.

== Notable people ==
- Eduard Freiherr von Broich (1832–1903), Prussian District Administrator for the Districts of Malmedy, Hersfeld, und Hanau
