= Eygelshoven Markt railway station =

Railway station in the Netherlands

Eygelshoven Markt
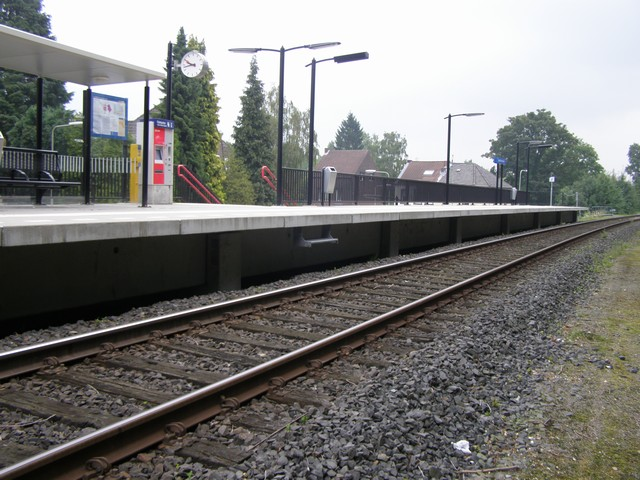

General information
- Location: Netherlands
- Coordinates: 50°53′25″N 6°02′44″E
- Line: Sittard–Herzogenrath railway

History
- Opened: 1909, reopened 2007
- Closed: 1952

Services
Preceding station	Arriva Netherlands	Following station
Landgraaf towards Liège-Guillemins	RE 18; LIMAX; Drielandentrein; Dreiländerzug; Train des trois pays	Herzogenrath towards Aachen Hbf
Location
- Location within Netherlands

Eygelshoven Markt (Dutch pronunciation: [ˌɛiɣəlsɦoːvə ˈmɑr(ə)kt]) is a railway station located in Eygelshoven, Netherlands.

== History ==
The station was opened in 1909 as Eygelshoven until its closure in 1952 and subsequent demolition. The station was rebuilt and opened on 9 December 2007 as Eygelshoven Markt. The station is located on the Sittard–Herzogenrath railway between Heerlen and Herzogenrath. The station was served by Euregiobahn until 15 December 2015 and until 9 December 2018 by DB Regio.

Eygelshoven Markt is located in the north of Eygelshoven, while Eygelshoven proper is located southwest of the town.

== Train services ==
The following train services by Arriva Nederland call at this station:

- RE 18 Aachen–Maastricht
