= Heerlen De Kissel railway station =

Former railway station in Heerlen, the Netherlands

Heerlen De Kissel
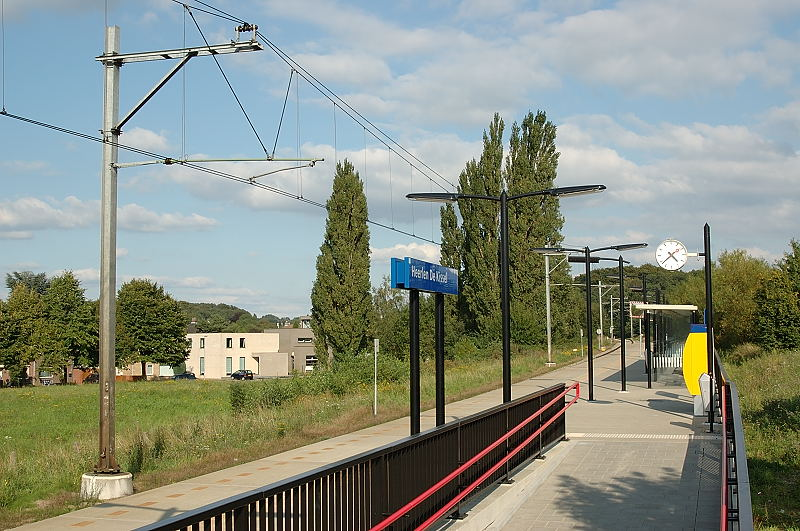

General information
- Location: Netherlands
- Coordinates: 50°53′26″N 5°59′44″E
- Line: Sittard–Herzogenrath railway
- Platforms: 1

Other information
- Station code: Hrlk

History
- Opened: 2007
- Closed: 2018
Location
- Location within Netherlands

Heerlen De Kissel was a railway station in Heerlen, Netherlands.

== History ==
The station opened on 9 December 2007. It is located on the Sittard–Herzogenrath railway and is part of the Heuvellandlijn. Train services were operated by Arriva. As of the timetable change in December 2018, the station was closed.
