= Übach-Palenberg station =

Railway station in Übach-Palenberg, Germany

Übach-Palenberg
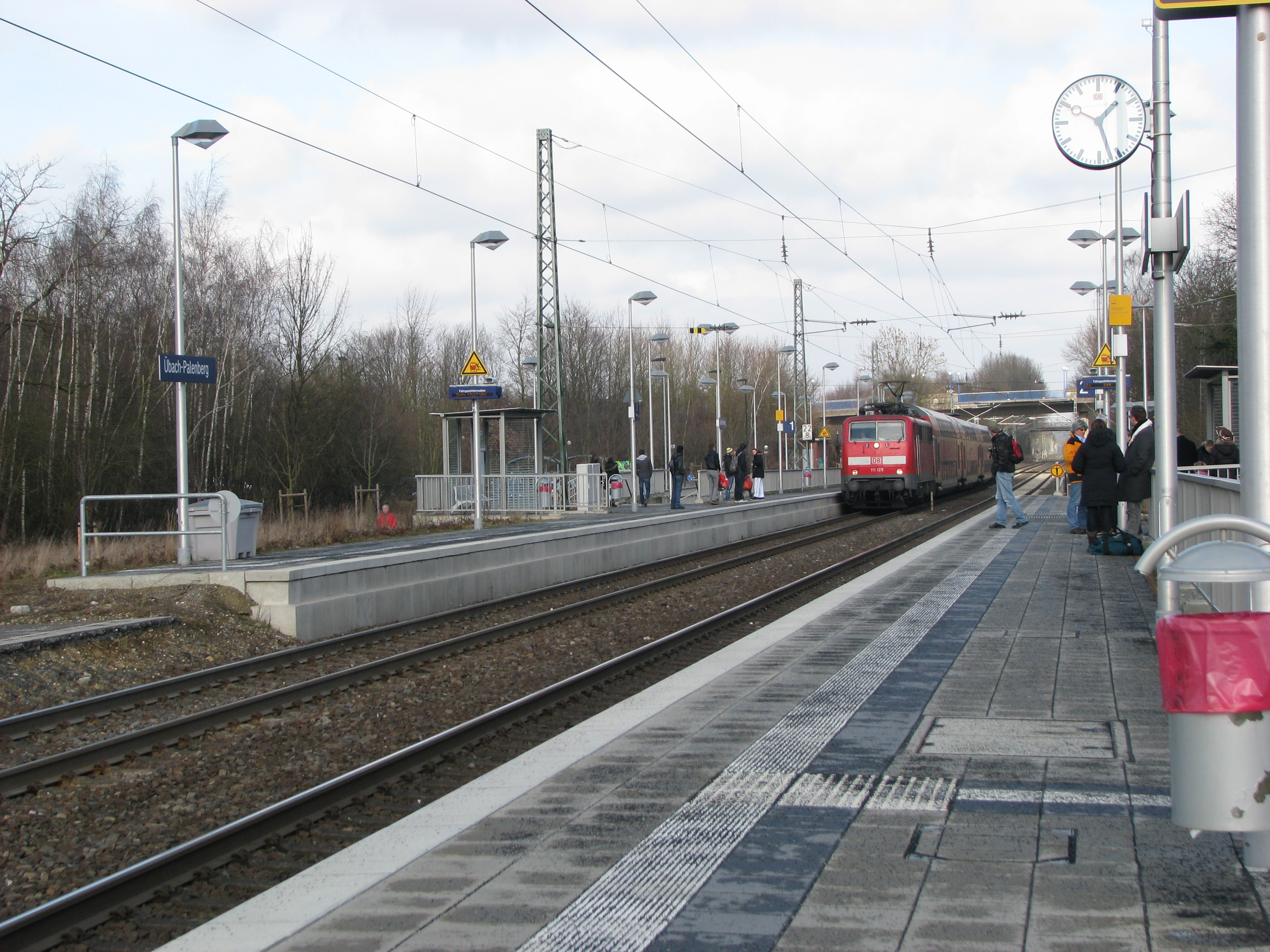

General information
- Location: Bahnhofstr. 17, Übach-Palenberg, NRW; Germany
- Coordinates: 50°55′27″N 6°5′52″E
- Line: Aachen–Mönchengladbach railway
- Platforms: 2

Construction
- Accessible: Yes

Other information
- Station code: 6297
- DS100 code: KUBP
- IBNR: 8005935
- Category: 5
- Fare zone: AVV: 54; VRS: 3420 (AVV transitional tariff)
- Website: www.bahnhof.de

History
- Opened: 1855/80

Services
Preceding station	National Express Germany	Following station
Herzogenrath towards Aachen Hbf	RE 4 (Wupper-Express)	Geilenkirchen towards Dortmund Hbf
Preceding station	DB Regio NRW	Following station
Herzogenrath towards Aachen Hbf	RB 33	Geilenkirchen towards Essen-Steele
Location

Übach-Palenberg station is in Übach-Palenberg on the southern edge of Heinsberg in the German state of North Rhine-Westphalia. It is located on the Aachen–Mönchengladbach railway on the western outskirts of Palenberg near the Wurm and is served by the Wupper-Express and the Rhein-Niers-Bahn. Its current form reflects its reconstruction and modernisation in the 1990s and in 2008. It is classified by Deutsche Bahn as a category 5 station.

== History ==
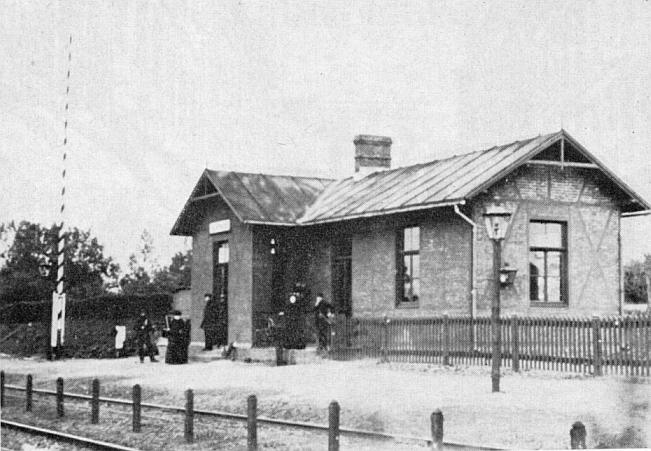
Station building in 1912

The Herzogenrath to Rheydt section of the Aachen–Mönchengladbach railway was opened on 11 November 1852 and a year later the Aachen-Düsseldorf-Ruhrort Railway Company completed its line between Aachen–Düsseldorf line. At this time Palenberg did not have its own station. The exact year in which the first station was built has not been determined. In the statistics of the year 1861, it is not mentioned, but in 1881 in the Official Journal (referring to special trains during the Great Pilgrimage to Aachen Cathedral) a station at Palenberg is mentioned. During this time a station must have been built on the western outskirts of Palenberg, which was then a small hamlet and was part of the still independent municipality of Frelenberg. In 1912, a siding was built for the Carolus Magnus colliery and on the site there is now a commuter parking area, which was built in the 1990s next to the wooden station building. Palenberg and the station became part of the new municipality of Ubach-Palenberg in 1935 and a year later the new station building was built on the eastern side and the station was renamed Ubach-Palenberg. This building was enlarged in 2002 and converted into a youth and seniors centre.

The station lost much of its purpose with the closure of the Carolus Magnus mine in 1962.

Work began on the complete transformation of the station area in 2000. The old station building was converted into a seniors centre and new premises for a youth center were built next to it. Seniors and youth have been able to meet at the former station building since 2002, which was declared a "multi-generational house" in 2008. In November 2007, the crossovers were removed and the third track and the Üf signalbox were abandoned. The station was thus converted into a Haltepunkt ("halt", that is having no crossovers). These renovations were carried out together with the connection of the signals and points on the section of the line between Ubach-Palenberg and Rheydt Hauptbahnhof to the Grevenbroich electronic signalling centre. In 2009, reconstruction started to provide the platforms with barrier-free access. The third platform, which was no longer usable, was demolished during this work. The newly reconstructed platforms were commissioned on 16 August 2010. With the generous park-and-ride facilities on the west and east sides, the station provides access to trains for commuters by car or bicycle. In addition, it is possible to rent lockable bicycle storage boxes.

== Rail services ==
The station is served by the following services:

Line	Line name	Route	
RE 4	Wupper-Express	Aachen – Herzogenrath – Übach-Palenberg – Lindern – Erkelenz – Rheydt – Mönchengladbach – Düsseldorf – Wuppertal – Hagen – Witten&nbs – Dortmund	
RB 33	Rhein Niers Bahn	Aachen Hbf - Übach-Palenberg – Lindern (portions coupled/uncoupled)	– Mönchengladbach – Duisburg – Mülheim – Essen
RB 33	Rhein Niers Bahn	Aachen Hbf - Übach-Palenberg – Lindern (portions coupled/uncoupled)	– Heinsberg
