= Kerkrade Centrum railway station =

Railway station in the Netherlands

Kerkrade Centrum
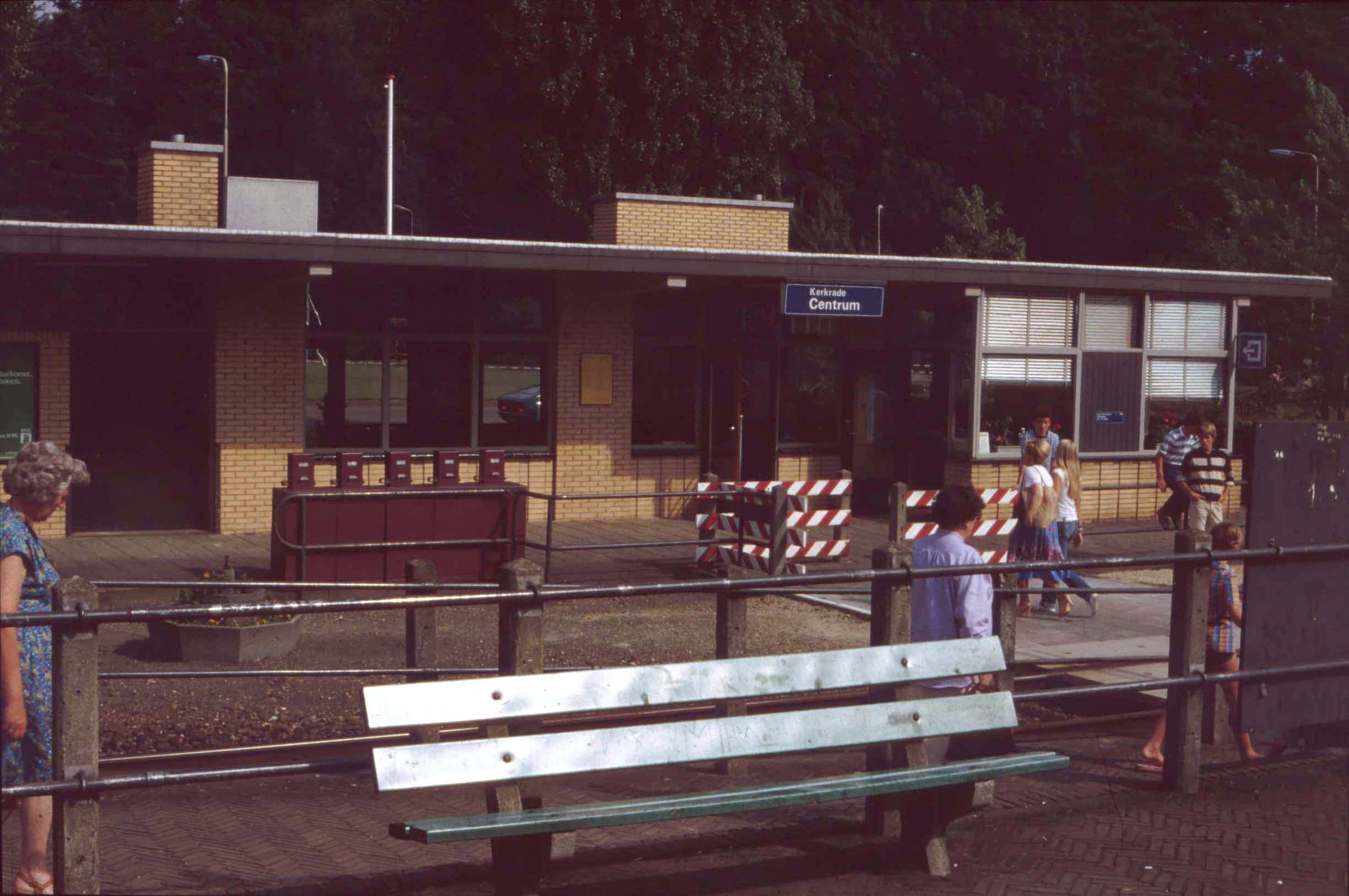
- Station building around 1980

General information
- Location: Stationsstraat 70; Kerkrade; Netherlands
- Coordinates: 50°51′41″N 6°03′27″E
- Lines: Schaesberg–Simpelveld railway Heuvellandlijn

Other information
- Station code: Krd

History
- Opened: 15 May 1949

Services
Preceding station	Arriva Netherlands	Following station
Chevremont towards Sittard	Stoptrein 32500	Terminus
Location
- Location within Netherlands

Kerkrade Centrum is a railway station in Kerkrade, Netherlands. The station was built in 1933 on the Schaesberg–Simpelveld railway and is the eastern terminus of the Heuvellandlijn (Maastricht–Kerkrade). However, as the Dutch Railways deemed it unprofitable at the time, the station did not see passenger services until 15 May 1949, when regular passenger services finally commenced on the Schaesberg–Simpelveld railway. Train services were operated by Veolia until 11 December 2016, when Arriva took over.

The station is about 200 m north of the German border.

The station is also served by the ZLSM heritage steam train to Schin op Geul and Simpelveld as well as Germany.

== Train services ==
The following local train services call at this station:

- Stoptrein S3: Sittard–Heerlen–Kerkrade

== Bus services ==
As of 11 December 2016, the following buses call at Kerkrade Centrum's bus stop:

- 20: Kerkrade–Parkstad Limburg Stadion–Heerlen–Brunssum–Schinveld (Arriva)
- 34: Kerkrade–Kohlscheid–Aachen (ASEAG)
