= Geilenkirchen station =

Railway station in Geilenkirchen, Germany

Geilenkirchen
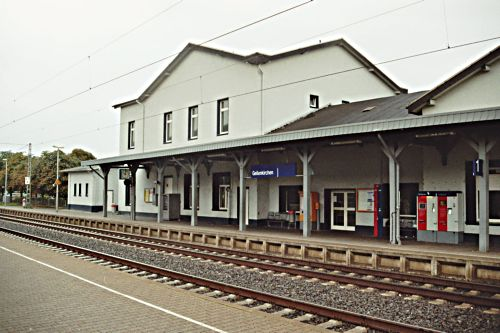

General information
- Location: Bahnhofstr. 1, Geilenkirchen, NRW; Germany
- Coordinates: 50°57′40″N 6°7′27″E
- Line: Aachen–Mönchengladbach railway
- Platforms: 3

Construction
- Accessible: Yes

Other information
- Station code: 2037
- DS100 code: KGEK
- IBNR: 8002206
- Category: 4
- Fare zone: AVV: 52; VRS: 3410 (AVV transitional tariff)
- Website: www.bahnhof.de

History
- Opened: 12 November 1852

Services
| Preceding station | DB Fernverkehr | Following station |
|---|---|---|
| Aachen Hbf Terminus | ICE 10 | Erkelenz One-way operation |
| Herzogenrath towards Aachen Hbf | ICE 14 | Erkelenz towards Berlin Ostbahnhof |
| Preceding station | National Express Germany | Following station |
| Übach-Palenberg towards Aachen Hbf | RE 4 (Wupper-Express) | Lindern towards Dortmund Hbf |
| Preceding station | DB Regio NRW | Following station |
| Übach-Palenberg towards Aachen Hbf | RB 33 | Lindern towards Essen-Steele |
Location

Geilenkirchen station is in Geilenkirchen in the German state of North Rhine-Westphalia on the Aachen–Mönchengladbach railway. It is the only railway station in the town of Geilenkirchen. It provided an interchange between the mainline railway and the Geilenkirchen District Railway (Geilenkirchener Kreisbahn) until 1971 and was a stop for long-distance traffic until 2001. It is classified by Deutsche Bahn as a category 4 station.

Geilenkirchen station has an entrance building that includes a waiting room, a ticket office and a fast food restaurant.

== Infrastructure ==
Geilenkirchen station has three platform tracks for passengers. All tracks are used by scheduled trains. Two Euregiobahn services terminate and reverse at platform track 3 on weekday mornings. Furthermore, there is a siding for WestEnergie und Verkehr GmbH (the municipal electrical and transport company of the Heinsberg district). Freight wagons, mostly hauled to the siding by locomotives of class 294, are regularly unloaded there. During construction on the line the siding is also used by work trains, such as during the works in relation to the connections to the electronic interlocking in Grevenbroich in October 2007.

== Signalling ==
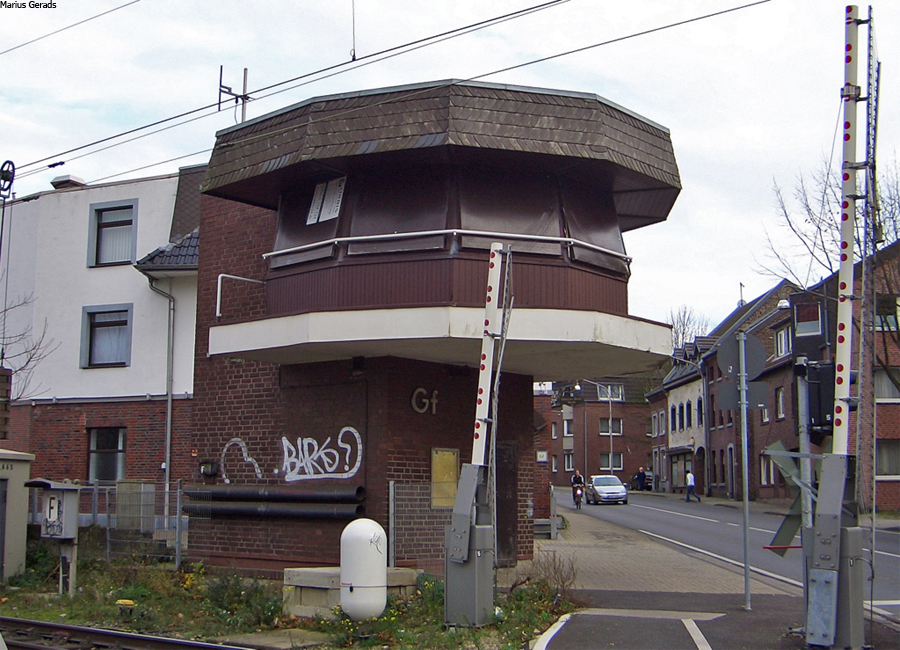
Geilenkirchen signal box

Up to 5 November 2007, the dispatcher at Geilenkirchen signal box Gf controlled three crossings, turnouts and the signals in the station. On 5 November 2007, this task was taken over by the Grevenbroich electronic signalling centre at the completion of its second phase of construction. After numerous acts of vandalism at the abandoned signal boxes between Rheydt and Ubach-Palenberg, the doors to all signal boxes on the section, including Geilenkirchen, were replaced with security doors and the boxes’ windows were secured with perforated plates in November 2009.

== History ==
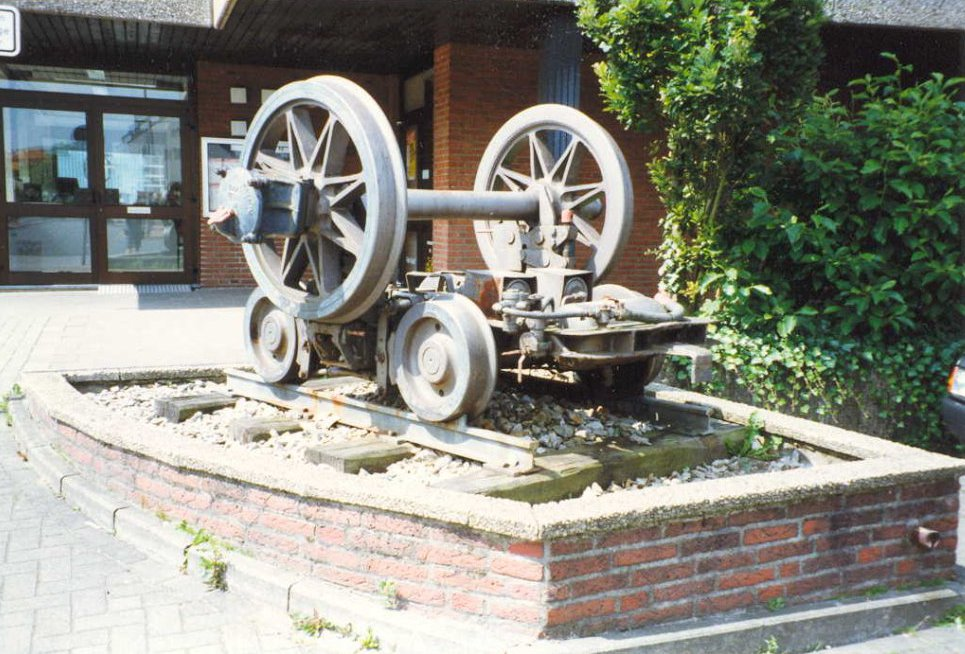
Rollbock on the track of the Geilenkirchen District Railway, used for the transport of wagons of the DB on the District Railway tracks

Geilenkirchen station was opened in 1852 with the opening of the Herzogenrath–Rheydt section. The station of the Geilenkirchen District Railway was opened next to it in 1900. Because of its central location, this was the largest on the District Railway. The station of the District Railway had a roundhouse and workshops. Because of the metre gauge of the District Railway, it was not possible to shunt freight wagons directly onto the tracks of the state railway. These required the use of special loading tracks. In 1938, the Rollbock system was installed, allowing standard gauge wagons to be carried over the metre-gauge tracks of the Geilenkirchen District Railway. The station freight handling thus consisted of two buildings, a warehouse for freight and baggage handling and a loading bay and a terminal track for loading and unloading wagons onto the Rollbock system (as Geilenkirchen has a Bundeswehr facility). After the end of the rail operation of the District Railway, the bus depot was later built on the grounds of the Geilenkirchen District Railway by Kreiswerke Heinsberg (the municipal utility of the Heinsberg district). It transports passengers by buses, which have now replaced the passenger trains of the District Railway. Kreiswerke Heinsberg has since been renamed WestEnergie und Verkehr.

Formerly, locomotives of classes 103 and 101 regularly hauled InterRegio services on the Aachen–Berlin route, which stopped at Geilenkirchen station. With the introduction of the timetable of the summer 2001 this route was abandoned.

In 2008, the town of Geilenkirchen took over the entrance building from Deutsche Bahn and began urgent renovation work. New businesses were to be integrated into the building. Already in 2008 a McDonald's branch opened at the station. A bakery, a kiosk and the office of a taxi company followed. In addition, the 3000 commuters a day using the station are able to use a more attractive waiting area with a service counter and new toilet facilities.

== Rail services ==
The station is served by the following services:

| Line | Line name | Route | |
|---|---|---|---|
| RE 4 | Wupper-Express | Aachen – Herzogenrath – Geilenkirchen – Erkelenz – Rheydt – Mönchengladbach – Düsseldorf Hbf – Wuppertal – Hagen – Witten – Dortmund | |
| RB 33 | Rhein Niers Bahn | Aachen - Geilenkirchen – Lindern (portions coupled/uncoupled) | – Mönchengladbach – Duisburg – Mülheim – Essen |
| RB 33 | Rhein Niers Bahn | Aachen - Geilenkirchen – Lindern (portions coupled/uncoupled) | – Heinsberg |
| RB 20 | Euregiobahn | Aachen Hbf – Herzogenrath – Geilenkirchen^{*} | |

^{*}two trips in each direction on Mon–Fri mornings only.

== Links to the station ==
Immediately in front of the entrance building is the Geilenkirchen bus station, which is a central component of the bus network of WestEnergie und Verkehr GmbH and the Aachener Verkehrsverbund (Aachen Transport Association).

There is a free parking area with 530 parking spaces behind the station for travelers by car from the area surrounding Geilenkirchener to the station. A pedestrian underpass provides barrier-free access between all platforms, the station building and the bus stop located in front of it. In addition it has parking spaces for bicycles and in front of the main entrance there is a zone for waiting vehicles and taxis.
