= Euregiobahn =

System of regional trains in Germany

RB 20: euregiobahn
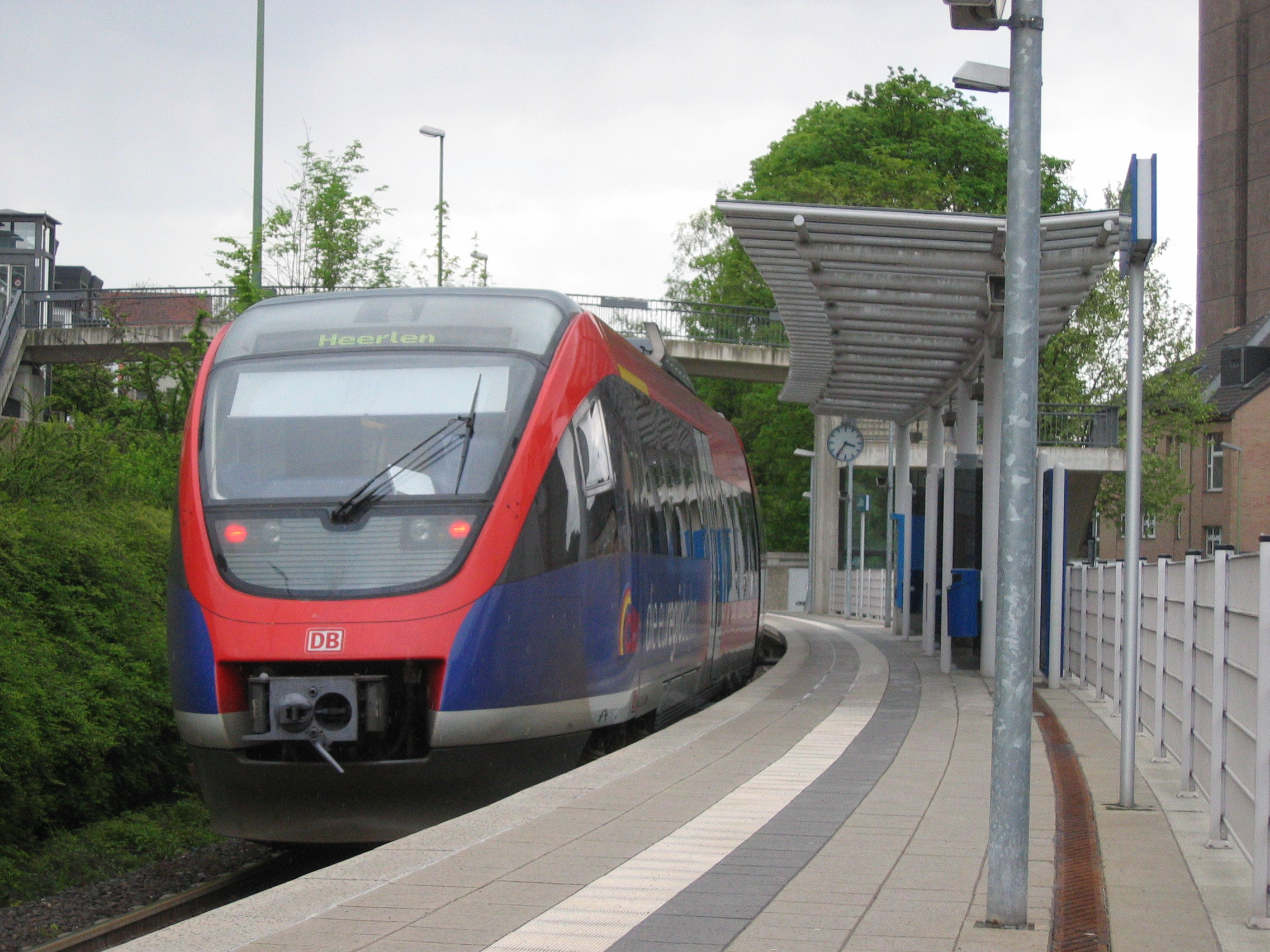

Overview
- Line number: Germany: 2543, 2550, 2570, 2571, 2572, 2600
- Locale: North Rhine-Westphalia

Service
- Route number: 528 (Heerlen–Herzogenrath) until 2015/12/15; 482.3 (Alsdorf-Poststraße–Herzogenrath); 485 (Herzogenrath–Aachen); 480 (Aachen–Stolberg); 482.1 (Stolberg–Stolberg-Altstadt); 482.2 (Stolberg–Langerwehe)
- Operator(s): DB Regio NRW

Technical
- Operating speed: 120 km/h max.

Euregiobahn is a system of regional trains (RB 20) in the combined area of the AVV (Aachener Verkehrverbund) at the Aachen (district), Düren (district) operated by DB Regio NRW.

== History ==
The historical predecessors of Euregiobahn were the first 2-hour-interval City Express trains between Heerlen and Aachen of the (Sittard–Herzogenrath railway) and (Aachen–Mönchengladbach railway), which were introduced in 1992 to replace the Maastricht–Aachen railway. As the first stage of the Euregiobahn regional rail system, the service from Heerlen in the Netherlands, Herzogenrath, Kohlscheid and Aachen to Stolberg (Rhineland) came into operation in June 2001 until December 2015. The section from Stolberg - Hauptbahnhof to Stolberg-Altstadt was reopened to passengers, including the Stolberg-Altstadt station (formerly Stolberg (Rhineland) Hammer) and the stations at Stolberg Rathhaus and Stolberg Mühlener Bf.

As a second stage the Eschweiler - Talbahn, Stolberg to Eschweiler-West Eschweiler Talbahnhof / Raiffeisen-Platz, Eschweiler-Nothberg to Eschweiler-Weisweiler and section of to Herzogenrath Alt-Merkstein, Herzogenrath August-Schmidt-Platz came into operation between September and December 2004. In December 2005, the route was extended via Alsdorf - Busch to Alsdorf - Anna Park. Finally the Euregiobahn opened two new stations in December 2007: Heerlen de Kissel and Eygelshoven Markt between Herzogenrath and Heerlen.

Despite public protests in support of the Eschweiler Eschweiler-Aue was not reopened in 2004 for financial reasons.

Owing to drastically reduced state funding, routes could at first be extended only sparingly. Construction of the new line from Eschweiler-Weisweiler to Langerwehe started in the summer of 2007 and it was opened on 14 June 2009. From that day trains ran from Eschweiler-Weisweiler to Langerwehe and finally in December 2009 the hourly service was extended to Düren. Since locations between Eschweiler-Nothberg and Langerwehe are now served by the Euregiobahn, the station at Nothberg on the Cologne–Aachen high-speed railway was closed in December 2009.

November 2011 saw the first test ride on the next section of the ring to be completed, the stretch from Alsdorf - Anna Park to Alsdorf - Kellerberg and Alsdorf - Poststrasse. The official inauguration took place on 9 December 2011 when a special train on the Euregiobahn at 18:02, for invited guests only, left the Alsdorf-Anna Park track. The scheduled passenger service began on 11 December 2011.

In June 2016, the ring between Stolberg, Herzogenrath and Alsdorf finally was inaugurated. Euregiobahn trains now start at the stations of Düren and Stolberg-Altstadt, are being coupled in Stolberg Hbf and continue their journey via Aachen and Herzogenrath back to Stolberg using the ring. During construction, there have been difficulties, because the track comes close to the Aachen Merzbrück Airfield. When the runway of the airport will be moved in near future, there are still some minor works to be done.

=== Reactivated routes ===
The following routes have been reopened for the operation of the infrastructure managed for Euregiobahn by EVS:

- 10 June 2001: Stolberg Hbf – Stolberg-Hammer (part of the Stolberg-Eupen railway)
- 10 September 2004: Stolberg Hbf – Eschweiler-Weisweiler (Mönchengladbach–Stolberg railway)
- 11 December 2004: Herzogenrath – Herzogenrath August-Schmidt-Platz (Merkstein) (part of the Stolberg-Herzogenrath railway)
- 11 December 2005: Herzogenrath August-Schmidt-Platz – Alsdorf-Anna Park (part of the Stolberg-Herzogenrath railway)
- 9 December 2011: Alsdorf Anna-Park – Alsdorf Poststrasse (part of the Stolberg-Herzogenrath railway)
- 15 June 2014: Alsdorf Poststrasse – Eschweiler-St. Jöris
- 12 June 2016: Eschweiler-St. Jöris – Stolberg Hbf

=== New routes ===
- 14 June 2009: from Eschweiler-Weisweiler to Langerwehe

== Pictures ==
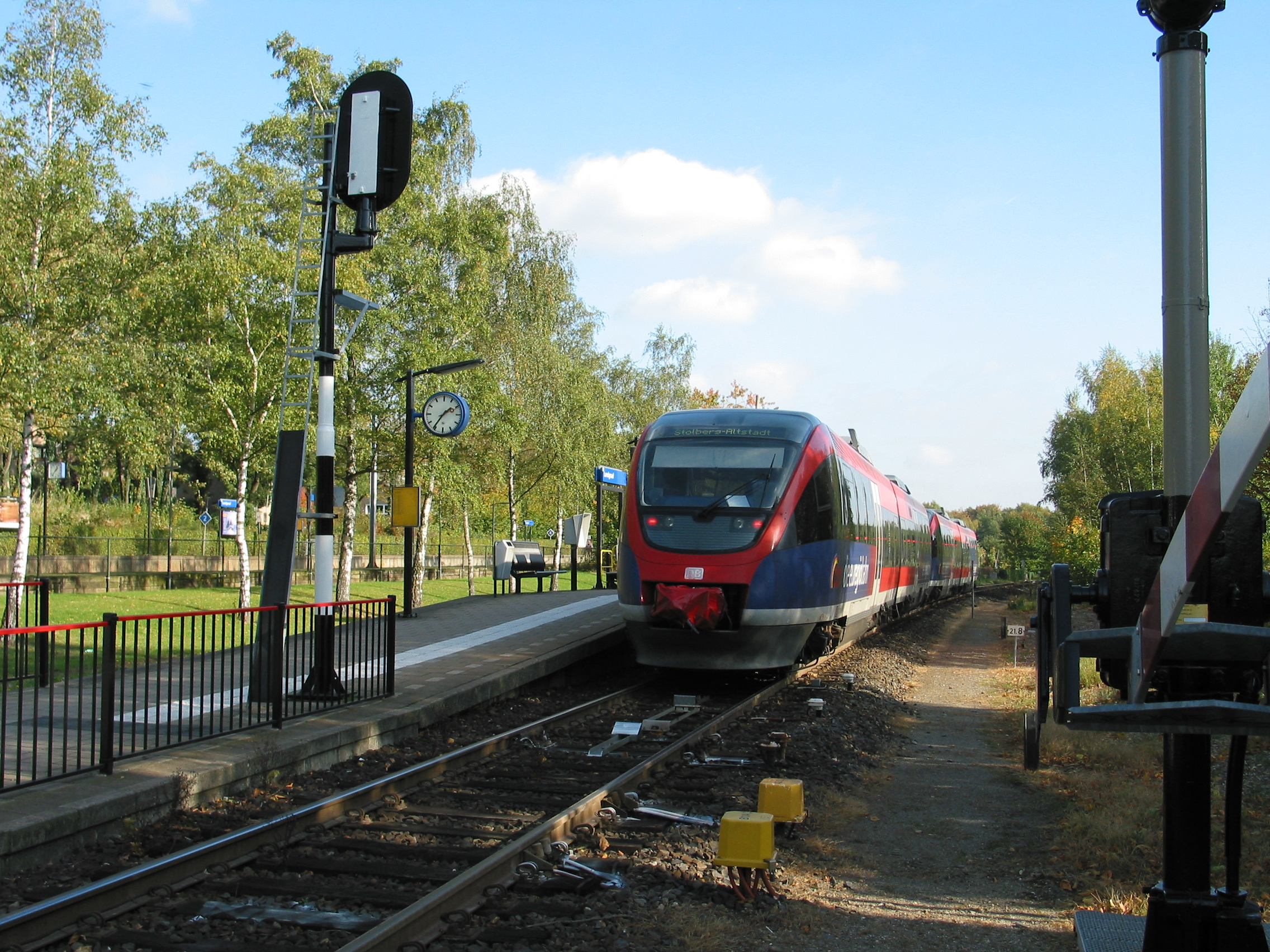
Euregiobahn at Landgraaf Station

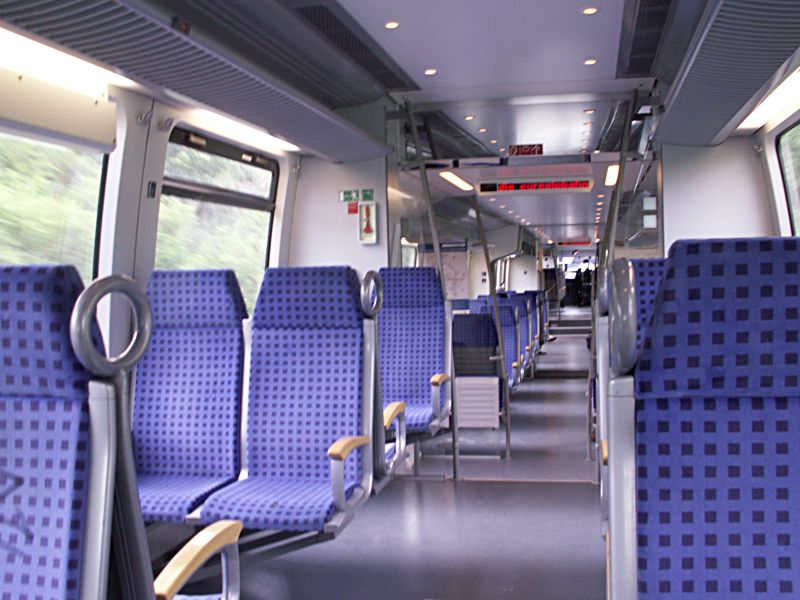
Inside Euroregiobahn-Train

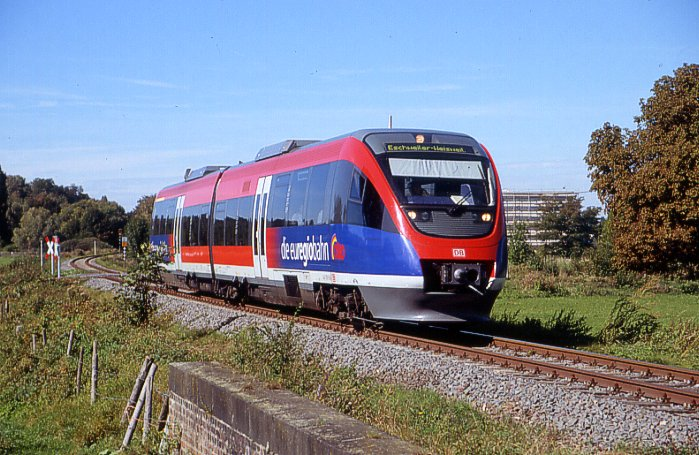
Euregiobahn at Eschweiler-Nothberg

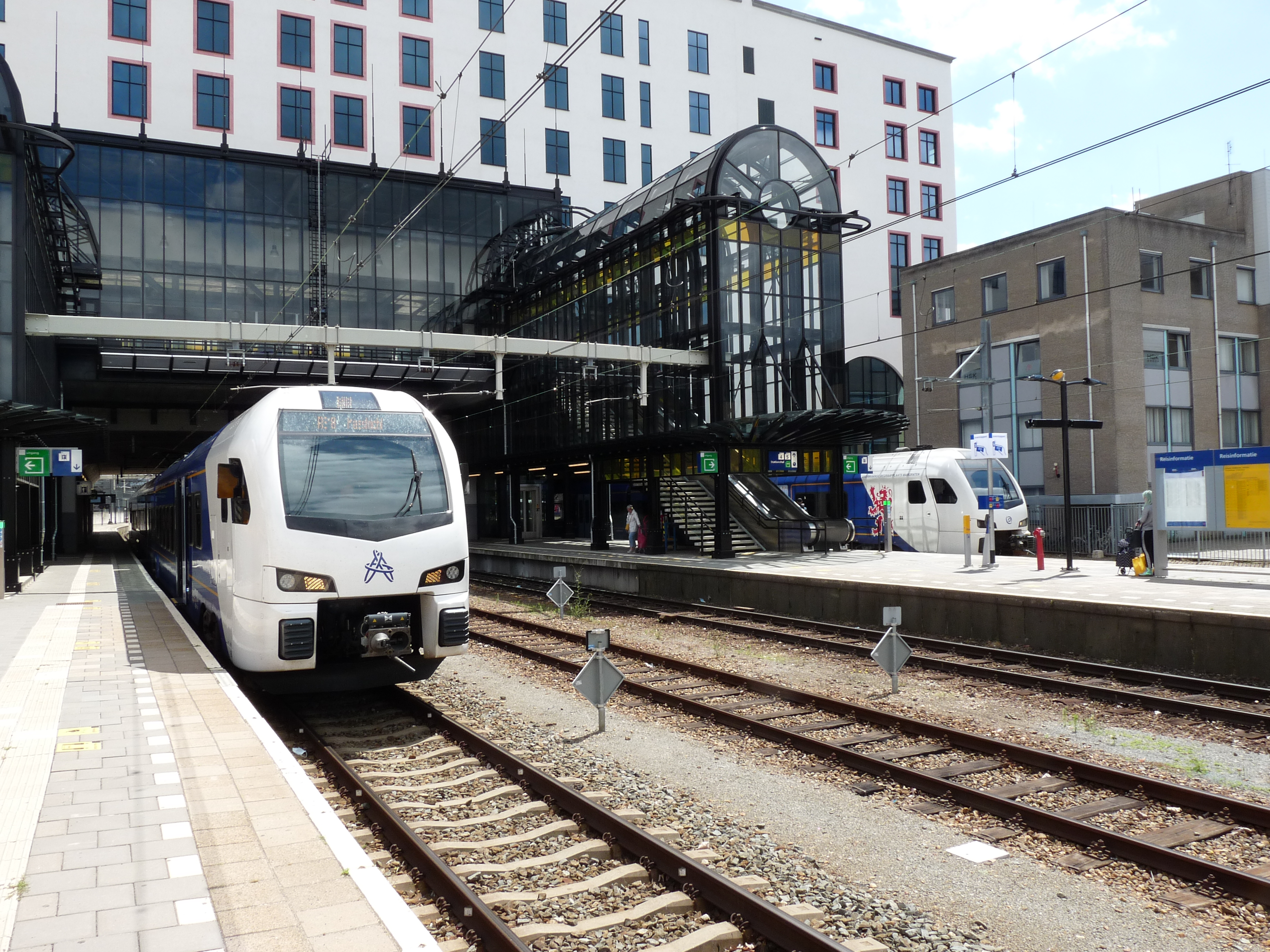
Heerlen station

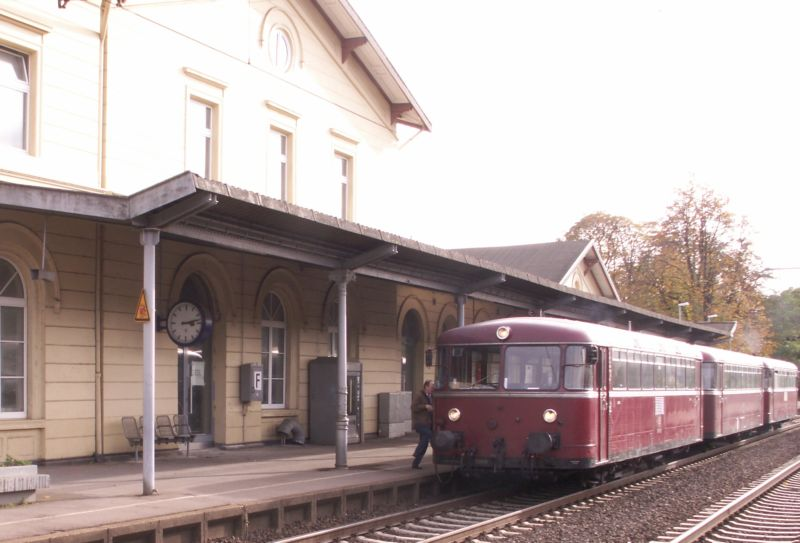
Herzogenrath station

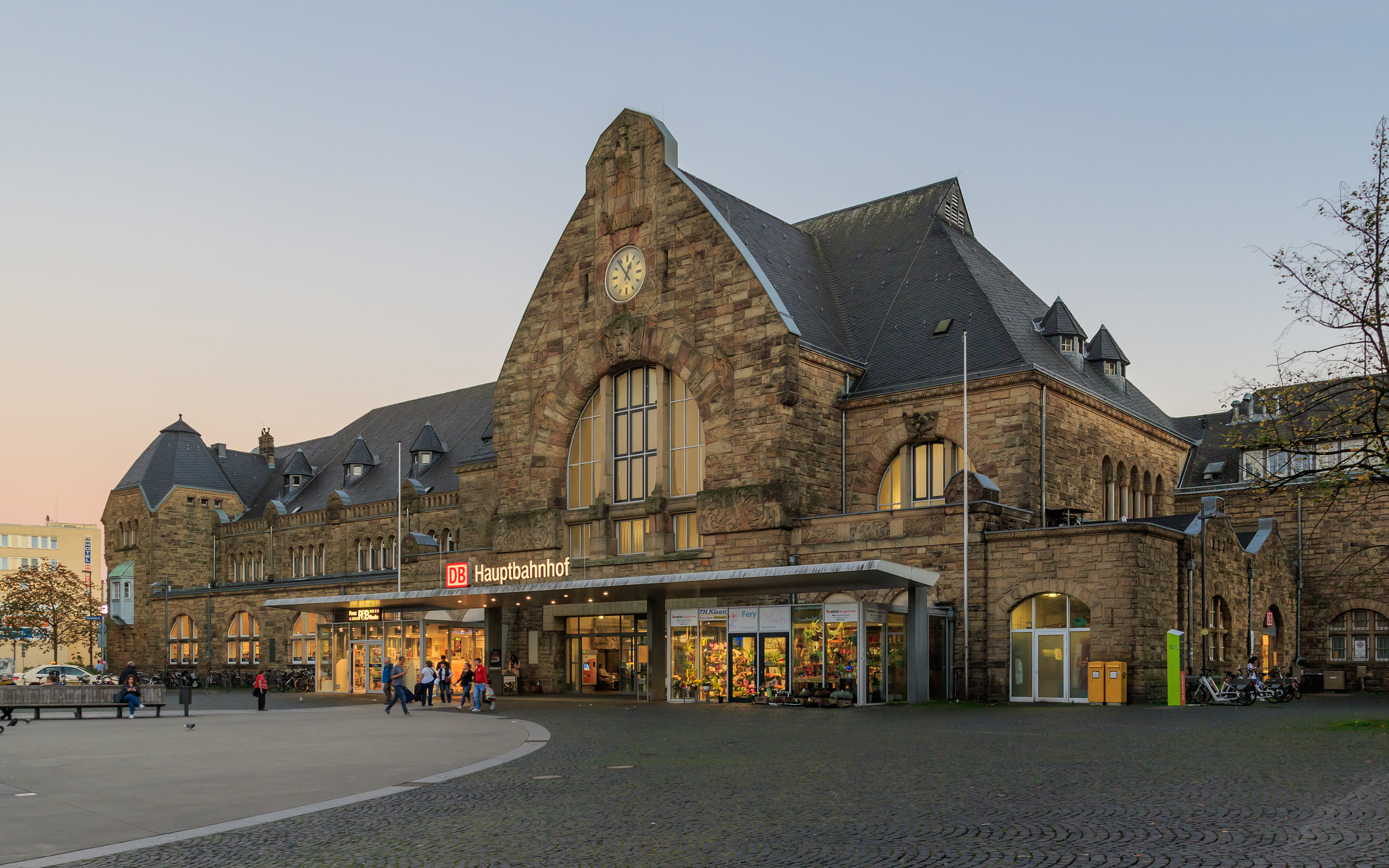
Aachen Central Station

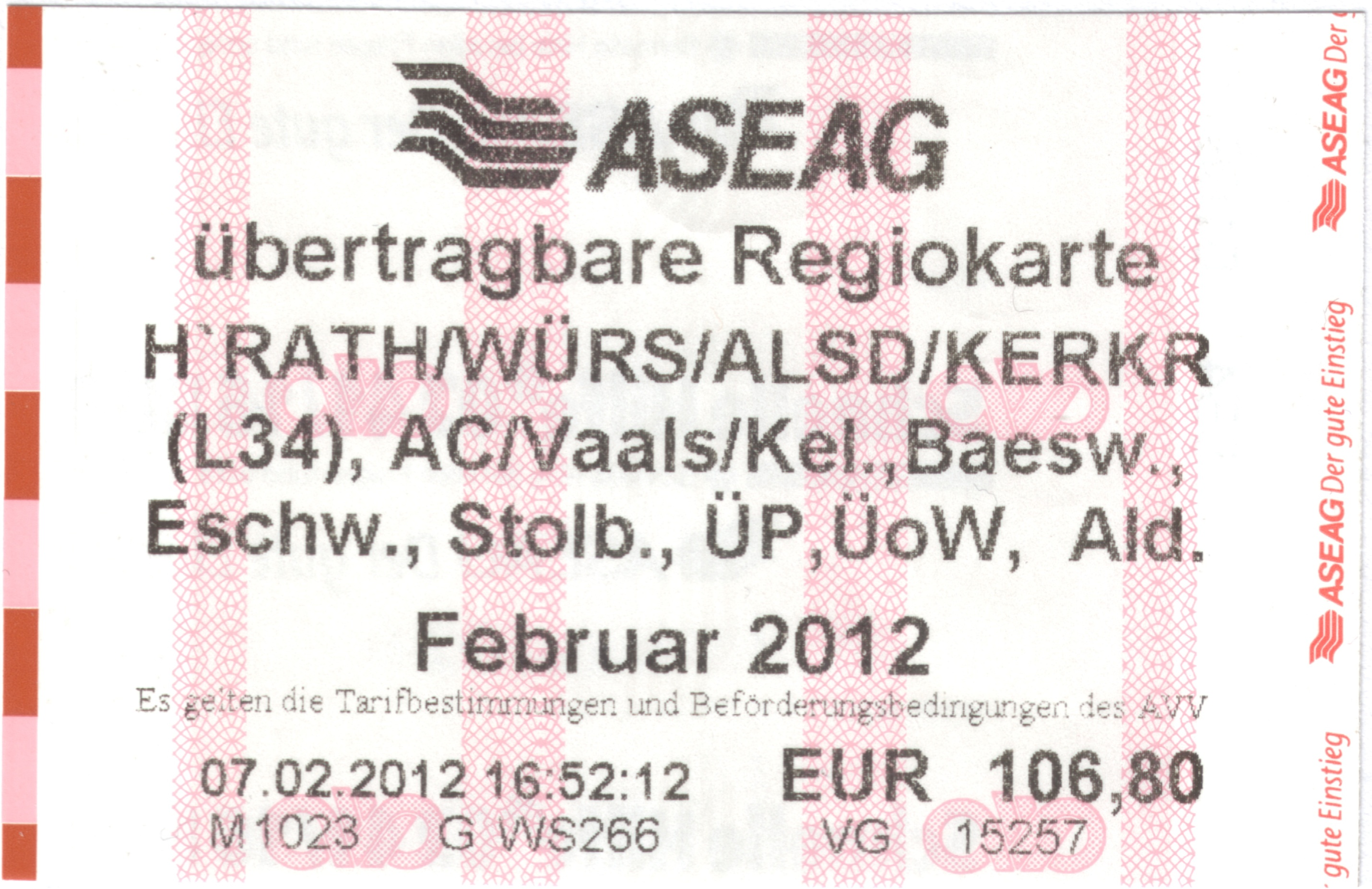
AVV Regiokarte

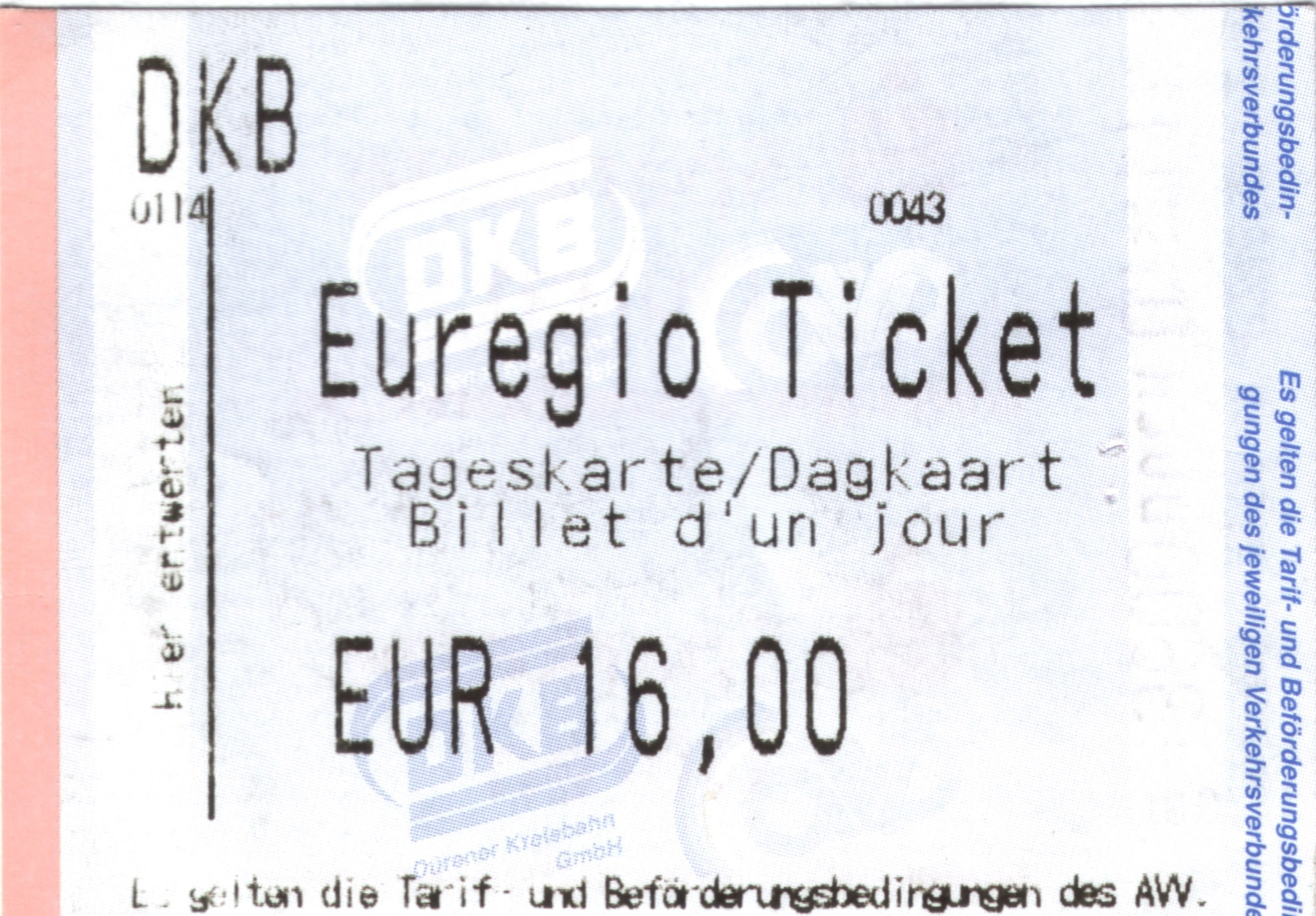
Euregio Ticket
