= Sittard–Herzogenrath railway =

Railway line in Germany and the Netherlands

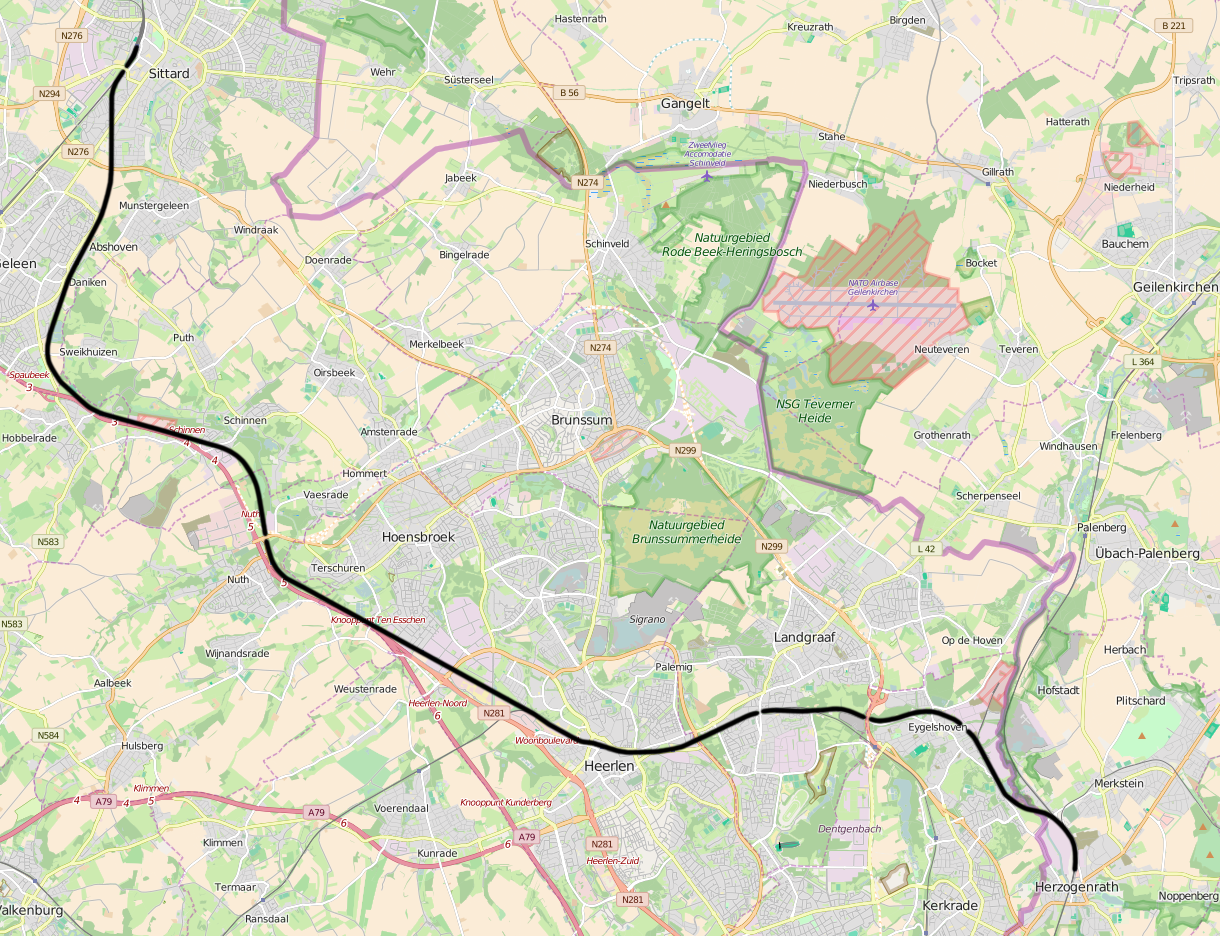

Overview
- Status: Operational
- Locale: Germany and the Netherlands
- Termini: Sittard railway station; Herzogenrath station

Service
- Operator(s): Nederlandse Spoorwegen, Arriva

History
- Opened: 1896

Technical
- Line length: 29 km (18 mi)
- Number of tracks: double track (Sittard–Landgraaf) single track (Landgraaf–Herzogenrath)
- Track gauge: 1,435 mm (4 ft 8 1/2 in) standard gauge
- Electrification: 1.5 kV DC (Sittard–border NL/D); 15 kV/16.7 Hz AC (border NL/D–Herzogenrath)
- Operating speed: 100 kilometres per hour (62 mph) (Sittard–Landgraaf); 80 kilometres per hour (50 mph) (Landgraaf–Herzogenrath)

The Sittard–Herzogenrath railway is a railway line running from Sittard in the Netherlands to Herzogenrath in Germany, passing through Heerlen. The line was opened in 1896.

== History ==
The line was nationalized in 1899. In World War II, cross-border passenger traffic was stopped on the line. In 1992, the first passenger trains began running on the line at 2-hour intervals as a City Express from Aachen to Heerlen. As the first real stage of the transnational regional rail system Euregiobahn in June 2001, the connection from Aachen to Heerlen via Herzogenrath was introduced. The train ran hourly from Heerlen to Stolberg.

== Present ==
April 2014 marked the start of the electrification of the single-track railway from Landgraaf to Herzogenrath, which was completed at the end of 2018. On 27 January 2019 Arriva started a direct service between Aachen, Heerlen and Maastricht. Plans to extend this service from Maastricht to Liège (Belgium) have been delayed to 2022 or later.

The following train services on this track:

- Intercity IC 3500: Amsterdam Schiphol – Utrecht – Eindhoven – Heerlen
- Sneltrein RE 18: Aachen – Heerlen – Maastricht
- Stoptrein RS15: Sittard – Heerlen – Kerkrade

== Stations ==
The main interchange stations on the Sittard–Herzogenrath railway are:

- Sittard: to Maastricht and Roermond
- Heerlen: to Maastricht
- Herzogenrath: to Mönchengladbach, Düsseldorf and Aachen

== Gallery ==
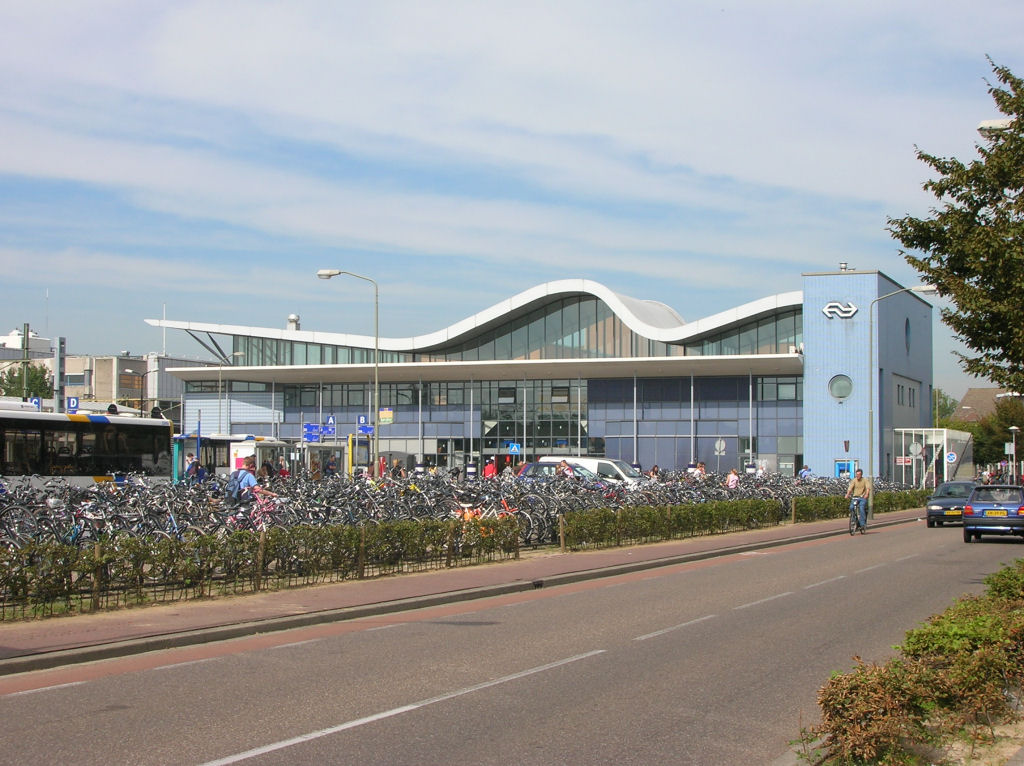
Station Sittard (2006)

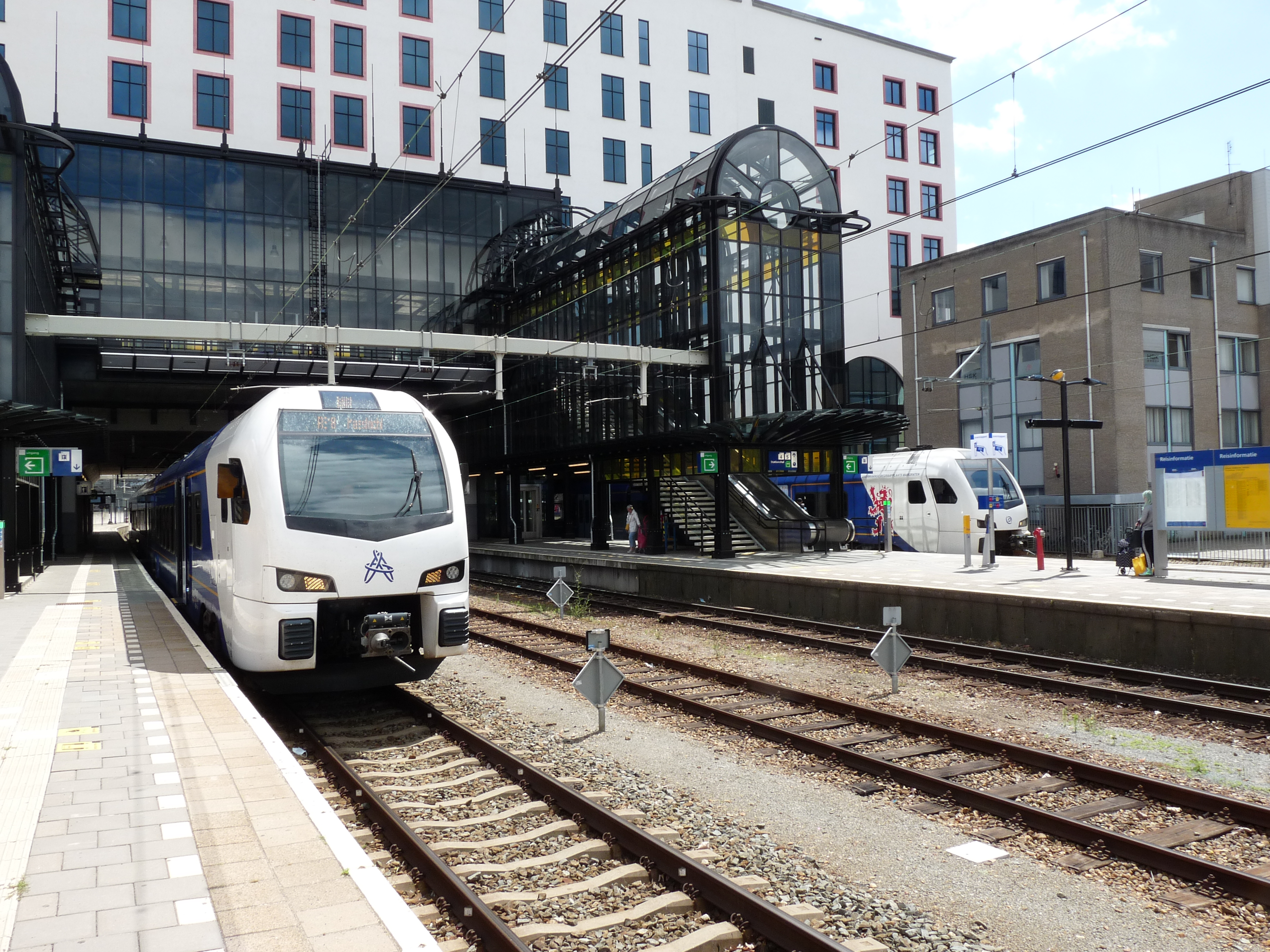
Station Heerlen (2020)

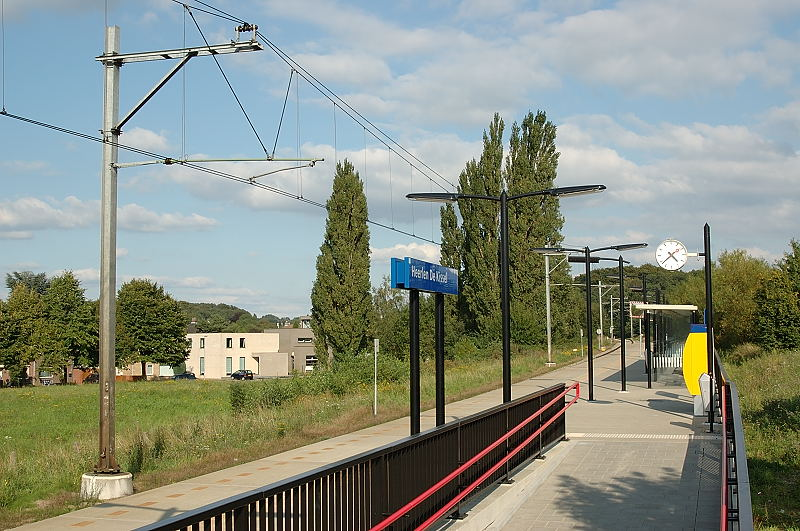
Station Heerlen De Kissel (2008)

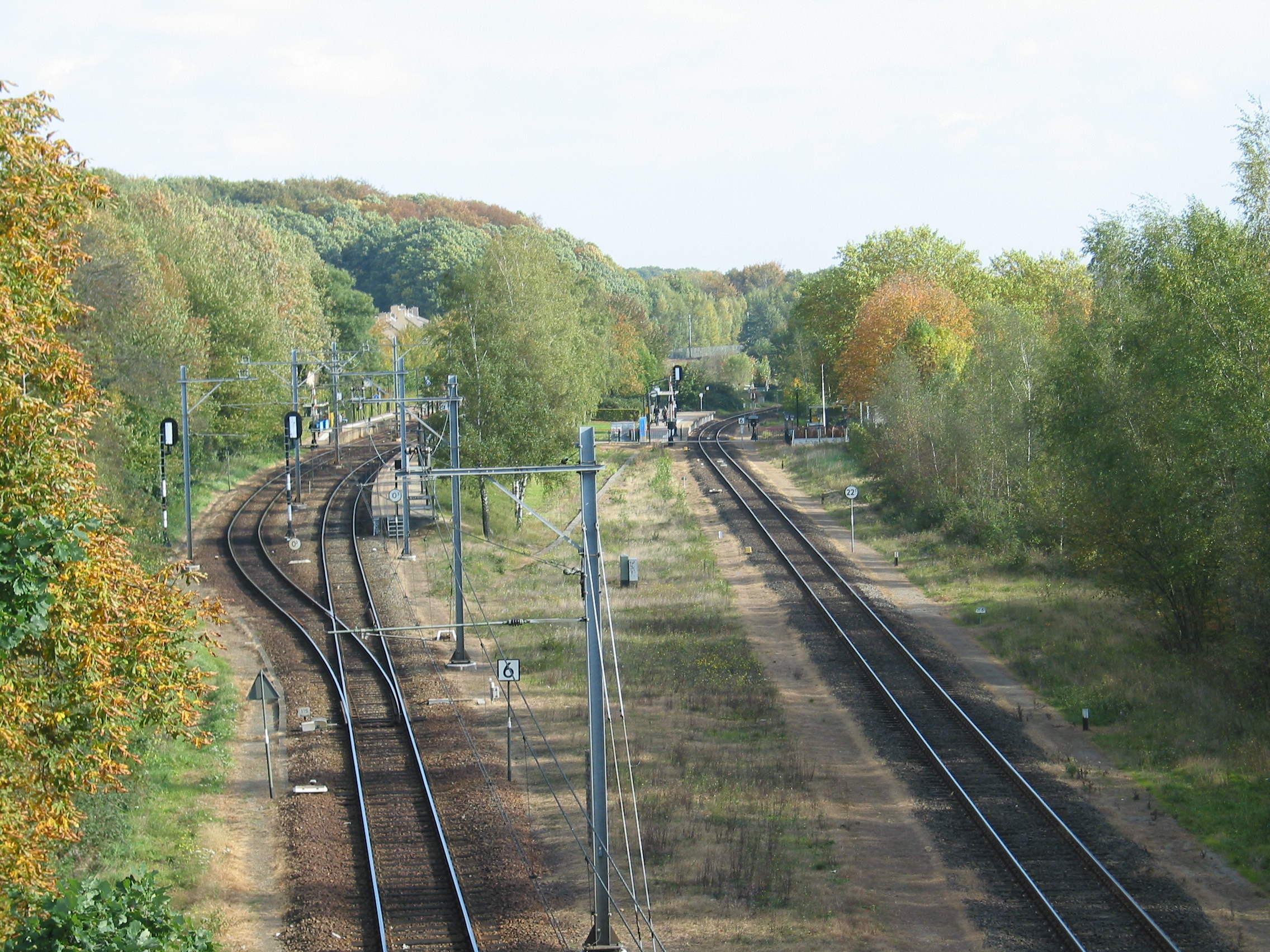
Station Landgraaf the right track direction Herzogenrath, left track direction Kerkrade. (2006)

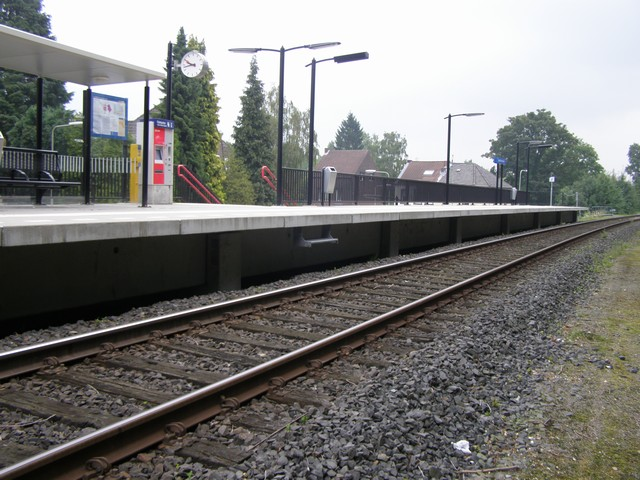
Station Eygelshoven Markt (2011)

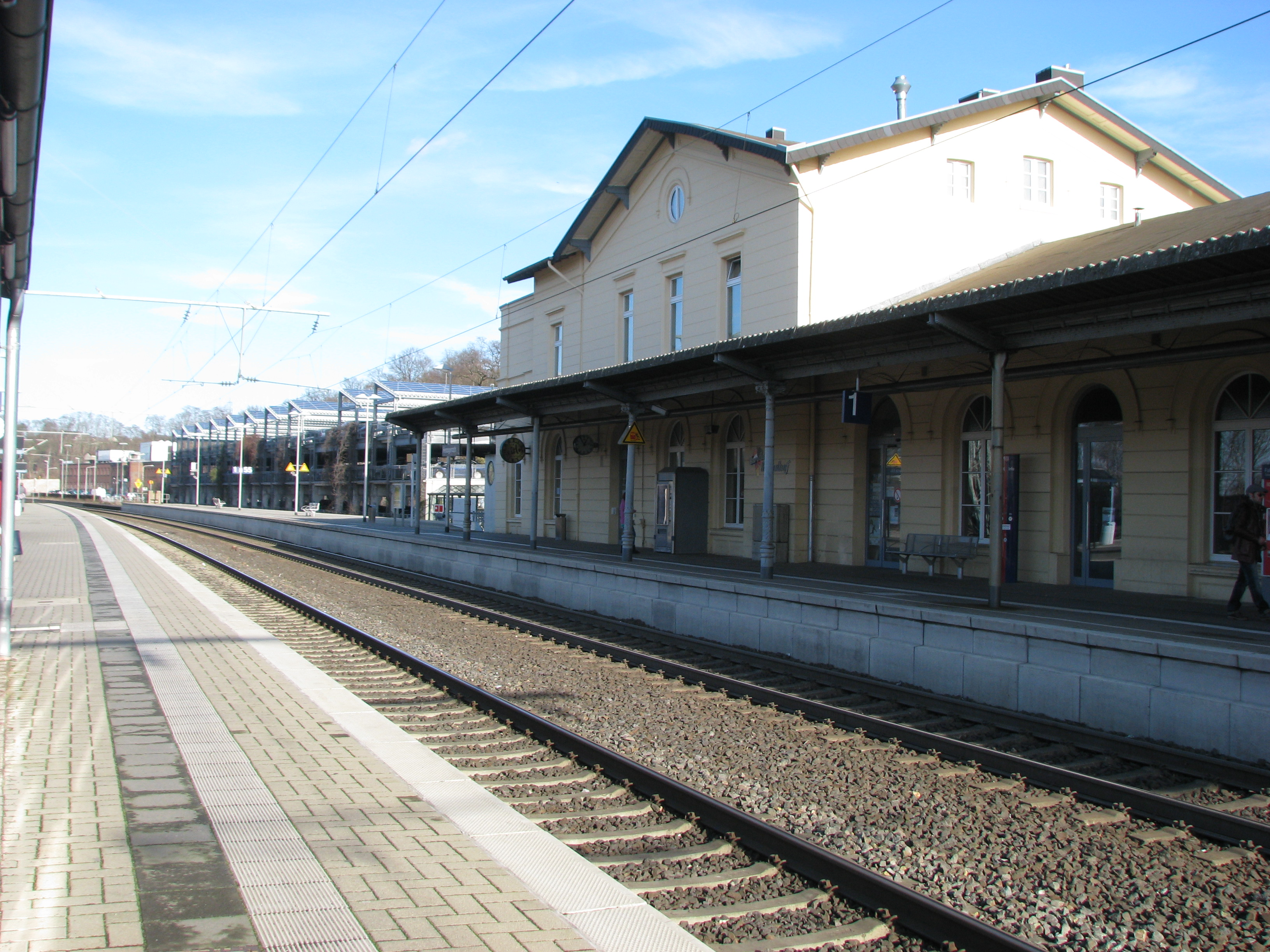
Bahnhof Herzogenrath (2012)
