= Aachen-Rothe Erde station =

Railway station in Aachen, Germany

Aachen Rothe Erde
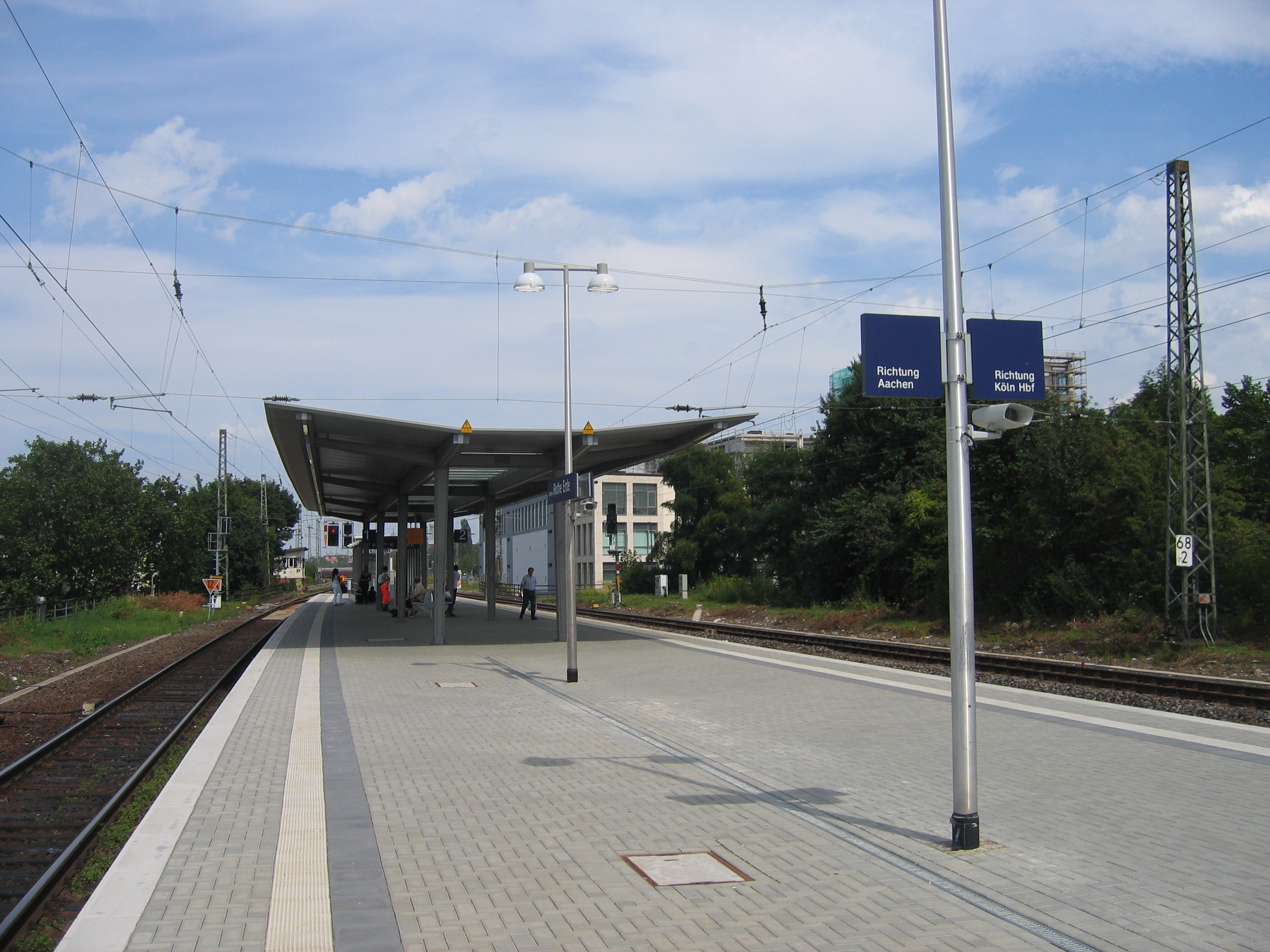
- Newly rebuilt platform

General information
- Location: Beverstr. 48; 52066 Aachen; Aachen, North Rhine-Westphalia; Germany
- Coordinates: 50°46′12.51″N 6°6′59.27″E
- Owner: DB Netz
- Operator: DB Station&Service
- Lines: Cologne–Aachen (D2600); Haaren–Aachen-Rothe Erde (D2560); NRW-Express (KBS 480); Rhein-Sieg-Express (KBS 480); Euregiobahn (KBS 482); Closed lines: Rothe Erde–Hahn (D2563); Rothe Erde – Moltkebahnhof (D64)
- Platforms: 1 island platform
- Tracks: 2

Construction
- Accessible: Yes

Other information
- Station code: 2
- DS100 code: KARE
- IBNR: 8000406
- Category: 4
- Fare zone: AVV: Aachen City-XL-Zone; VRS: 3100 (AVV transitional tariff)
- Website: www.bahnhof.de

History
- Opened: 1875; 151 years ago

Services
Preceding station	DB Regio NRW	Following station
Aachen Hbf Terminus	RE 9	Stolberg (Rheinland) Hbf towards Siegen Hbf
Aachen Hbf towards Heerlen or Alsdorf Poststraße	RB 20	Eilendorf towards Langerwehe/Düren or Stolberg Altstadt
Preceding station	National Express Germany	Following station
Aachen Hbf Terminus	RE 1 (NRW-Express)	Stolberg (Rheinland) Hbf towards Hamm (Westf) Hbf
Location

Aachen-Rothe Erde station is a station in the German state of North Rhine-Westphalia on the Cologne–Aachen high-speed railway. It is located in the eastern Aachen district of Rothe Erde near the districts of Frankenberg, Forst and Ostviertel. It is classified by Deutsche Bahn as a category 4 station.

== History ==
With the opening of the Haaren–Aachen-Rothe Erde railway on 31 December 1875, the station was also opened by the Aachen Industrial Railway Company (Aachener Industriebahn) under the name of Rothe Erde. Especially after Adolph Kirdorf accelerated the expansion of the Aachener Hütten-Aktien-Vereins Rothe Erde (Aachen Iron Works-Rothe Erde Association), the station served initially as a transfer station to the tracks connecting here to various factories in Rothe Erde. As the station was originally only used for freight, it was used for connections to the coal mines in neighbouring Belgium, the northern part of the Aachen district and the quarries in Stolberg. Ten years after its opening, the Venn Railway (Vennbahn) was opened, connecting to Luxembourg via Monschau and St. Vith, and the station was connected to the local ARBED steel works. The new Aachen-Rothe Erde locomotive workshop was opened at the same time.

The station has served passengers since 1880. The railway tracks were relaid about 100 metres closer to the town in 1892 to remove rail traffic from the level crossing on an increasingly important arterial road, today's Trierer Straße. The line was built over lower ground, while retaining its original height, allowing a bridge to be built over the road.

At the beginning of the 20th century, the station was renamed Aachen-Rothe Erde. The locomotive workshop was closed in 1932.

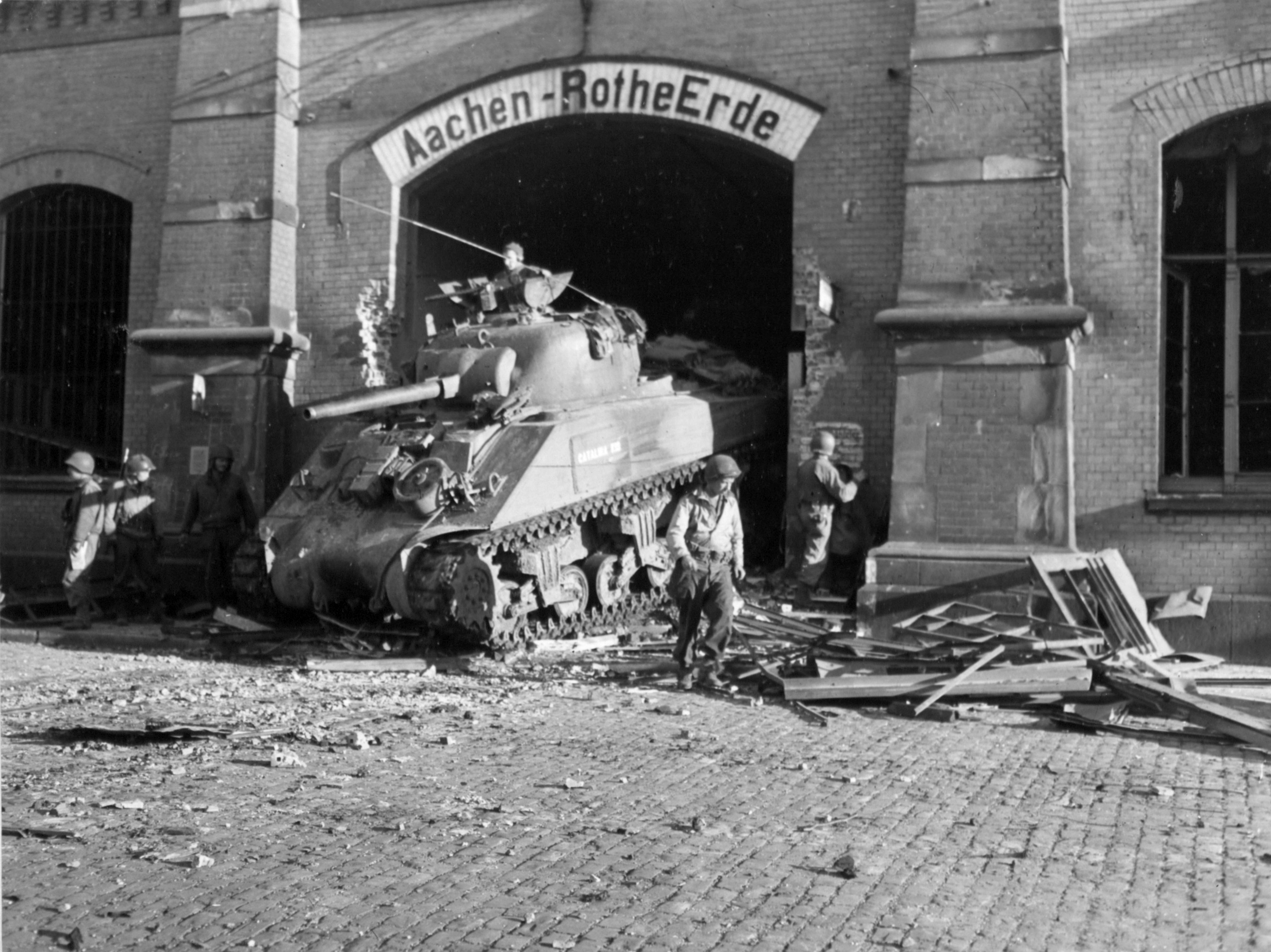
The first U.S. tank to enter Aachen, Germany. Photo from battle of Aachen, 1944.

In the Second World War, the station was badly damaged and the bridge over Trierer Straße was blown up. The Aachen–Cologne line was not reopened until 1946. As a result, the handling of steel, coke and limestone was abandoned and the station became less important for the transfer of freight. Only the connections to Aachen Nord station and the neighbouring Waggonfabrik Talbot rolling stock factory and the Aachen Philips factories on the Venn Railway remained in operation. In contrast, Rothe Erde station continued to serve passengers on the Aachen–Cologne line. In 2004, the freight shed were finally demolished and the now disused railway land was mostly levelled for the construction of the Aachen Arkaden shopping centre.

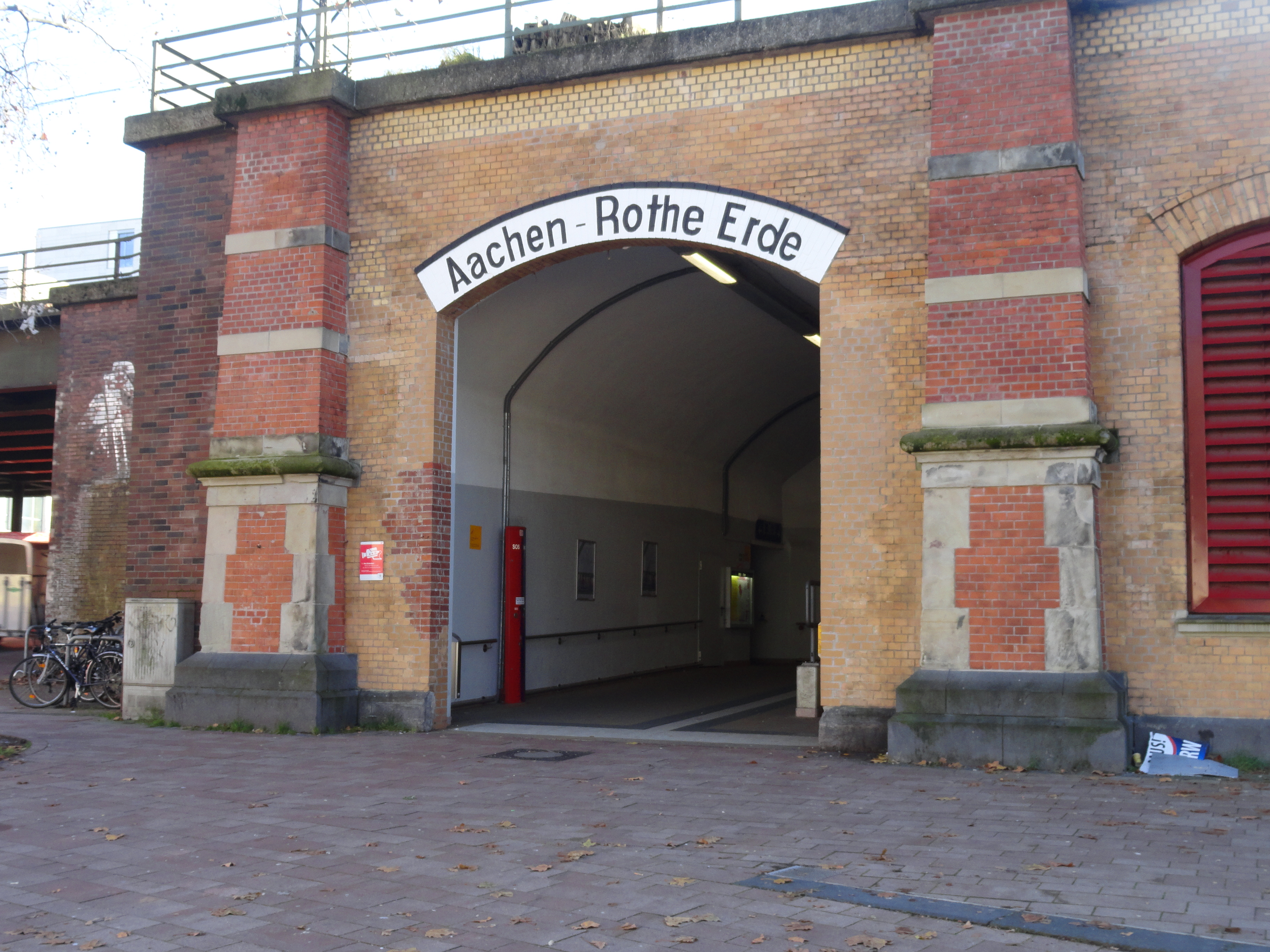
Station in 2014

== Rail services ==
In 2007, the entire station was rebuilt during the commissioning of the Aachen electronic interlocking. The old freight and storage sidings were greatly scaled back. Prior to the remodelling, the station had two mechanical signal boxes, one of which controlled the semaphore signals and points for passenger and freight operations at the station. Another signal box called Rr was demolished in preparation for the construction of the Aachen Arkaden shopping centre in 2004. Meanwhile, the station was equipped with Ks-signals, which are controlled remotely from the Duisburg electronic signalling centre. The island platform was built from scratch and has a height of 76 cm (30 in) above the top of the rail. The station also received a second access route on the eastern side with a lift for barrier-free access to the platform.

In the period from January 2007 until the opening on 9 October 2008 a large part of the former site of the former freight yard was demolished and replaced by the Aachen Arkaden, an office complex and shopping centre with 16,000 m^{2} (170,000 sq ft) of retail space. It was built in a functional contemporary architectural style of minimalism with atriums with transparent glass roofs. It has traditional arcades, a tower on six stilts and shops.

Part of the old freight yard is now used as sidings for the rolling stock and the railcars of Euregiobahn, which can be refuelled there.

Currently Aachen-Rothe Erde is served by the NRW-Express, Rhein-Sieg-Express and Euregiobahn. In addition, the station is served at night by S-Bahn line S19, which runs to Aachen or Troisdorf.

Line	Name	Route		
RE 1	NRW-Express	Aachen – Aachen-Rothe Erde – Stolberg (Rheinl) – Eschweiler – Düren – Cologne – Düsseldorf – Duisburg – Essen – Dortmund – Hamm (Westf) (– Paderborn)		
RE 9	Rhein-Sieg-Express	Aachen – Aachen-Rothe Erde – Stolberg (Rheinl) – Eschweiler – Düren – Cologne – Siegburg/Bonn – Au (Sieg) – Siegen		
RB 20	Euregiobahn	Alsdorf Poststraße – Herzogenrath – Aachen – Aachen-Rothe Erde – Eilendorf – Stolberg (Rheinl) (coupled/uncoupled)	– Stolberg Altstadt	
RB 20	Euregiobahn	Alsdorf Poststraße – Herzogenrath – Aachen – Aachen-Rothe Erde – Eilendorf – Stolberg (Rheinl) (coupled/uncoupled)	– Eschweiler-Tal – Langerwehe (– Düren)	
S19	Cologne S-Bahn	Aachen Hauptbahnhof – Aachen-Rothe Erde – Stolberg (Rheinland) – Eschweiler – Langerwehe – Düren – Horrem – Cologne – Cologne/Bonn Airport station – Troisdorf		1x per night

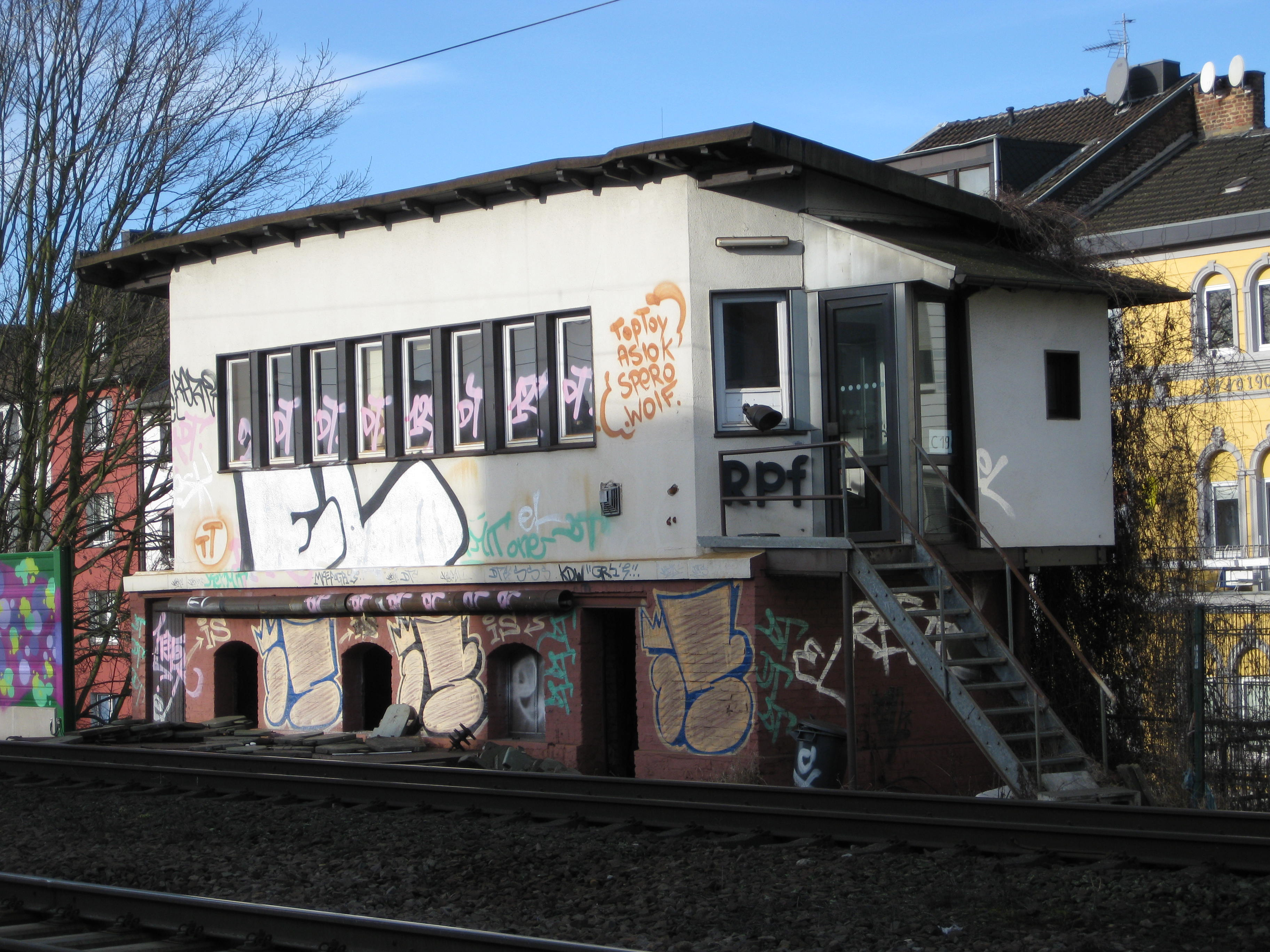
Former signalbox

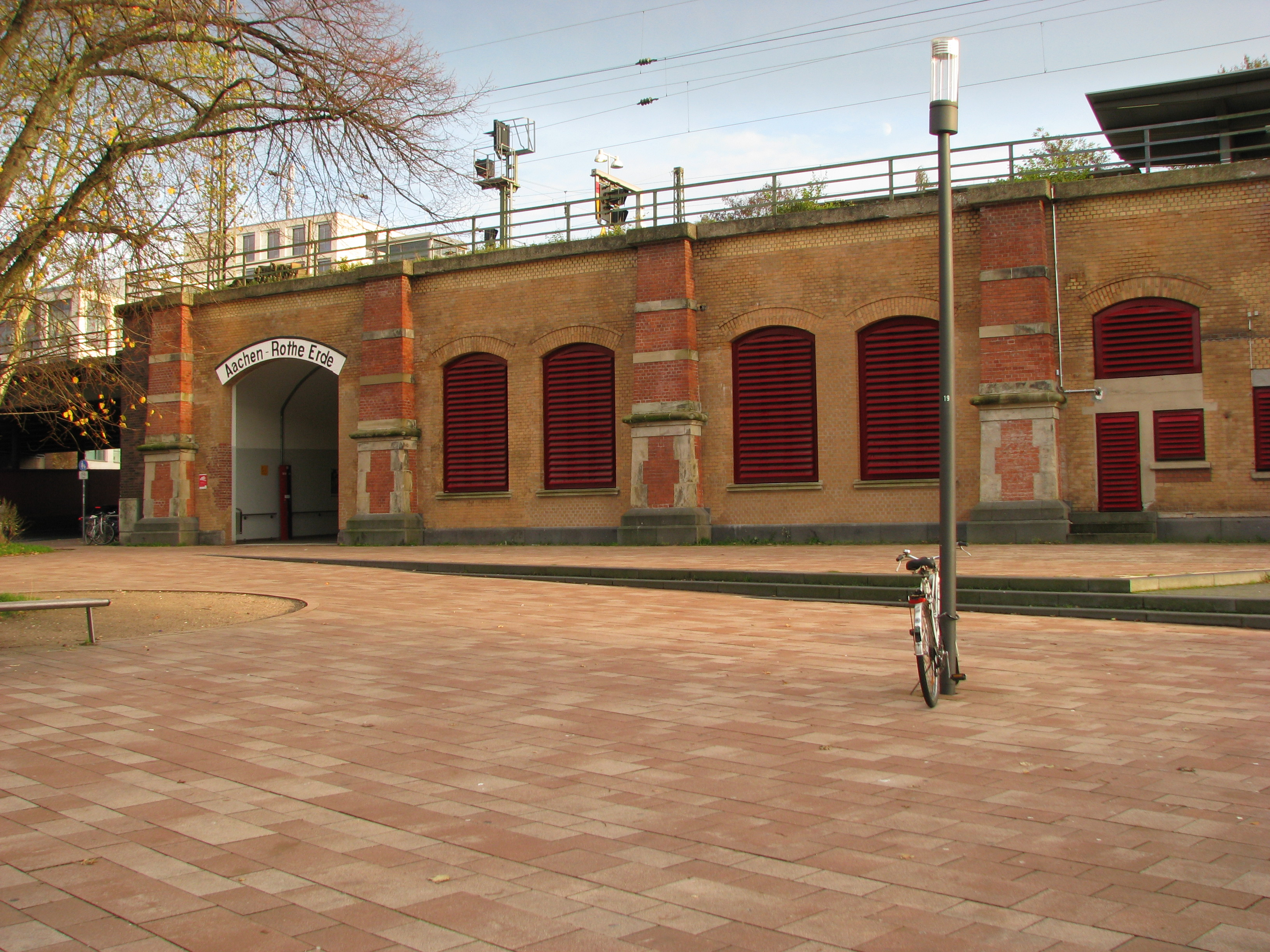
Western entrance

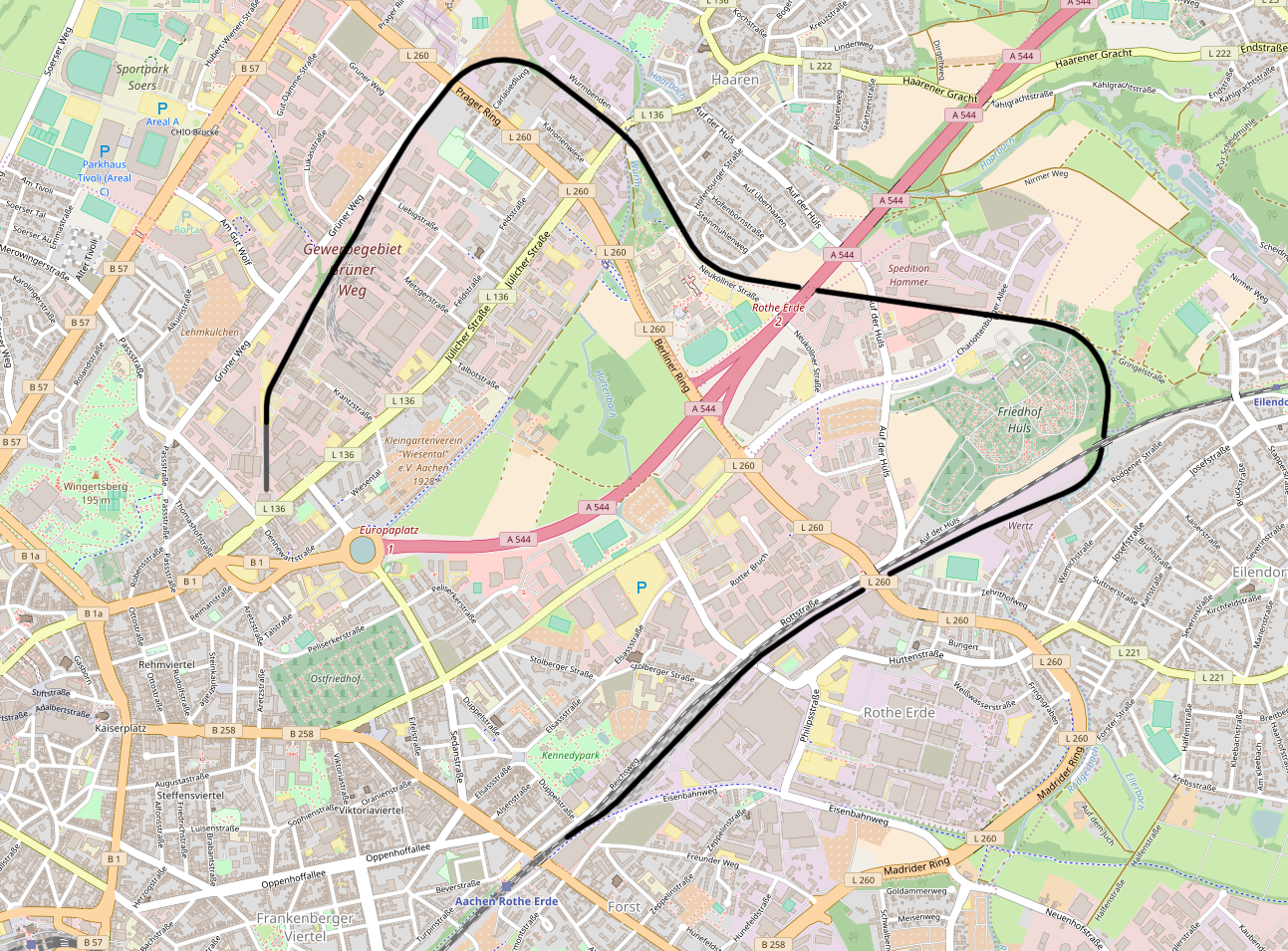
Rothe Erde – Talbot (Aachen Nord) connection

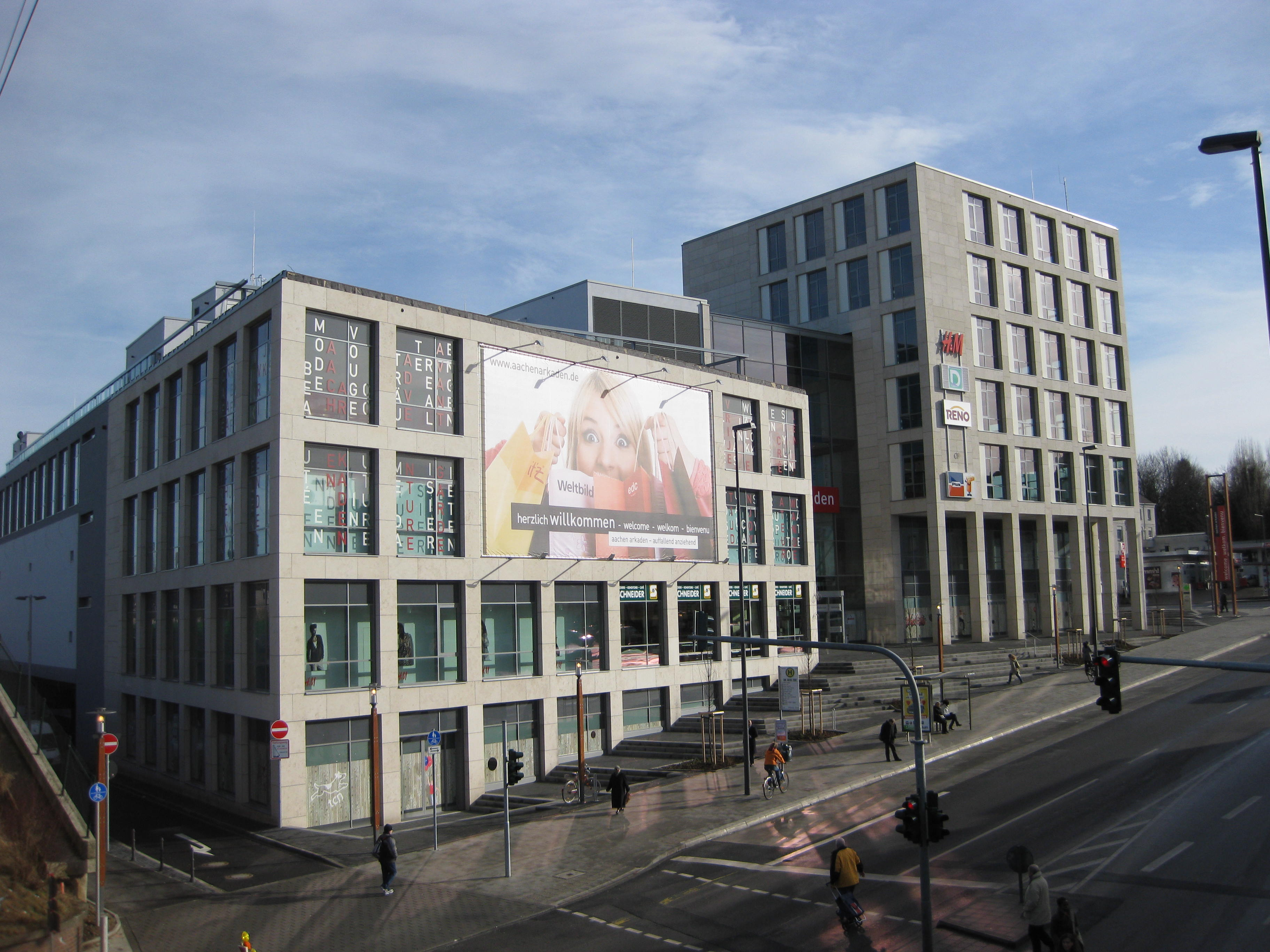
Shopping centre on old freight yard

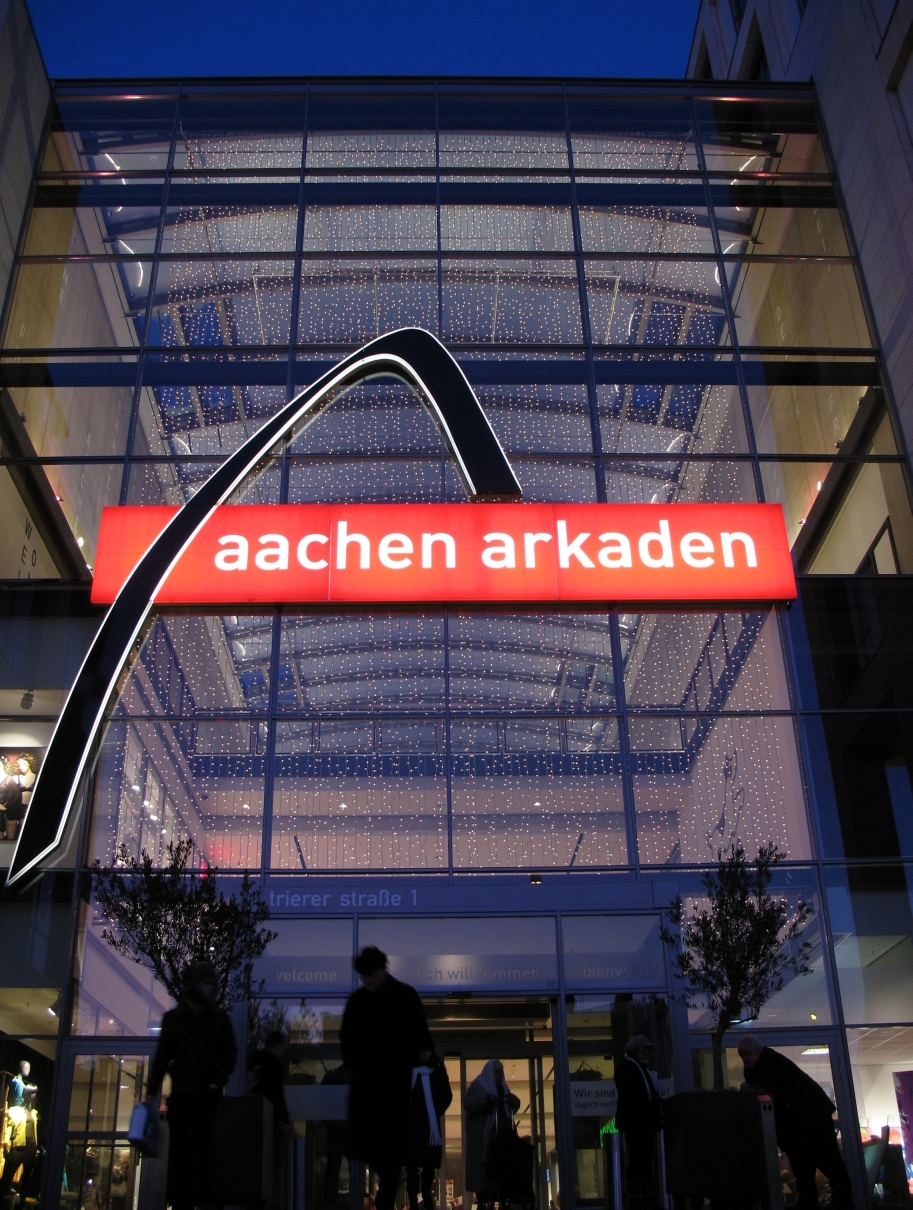
Front view of Aachen Arkaden mall
