= Stolberg (Rheinland) Hauptbahnhof =

Railway station in Germany

Stolberg (Rheinl) Hbf
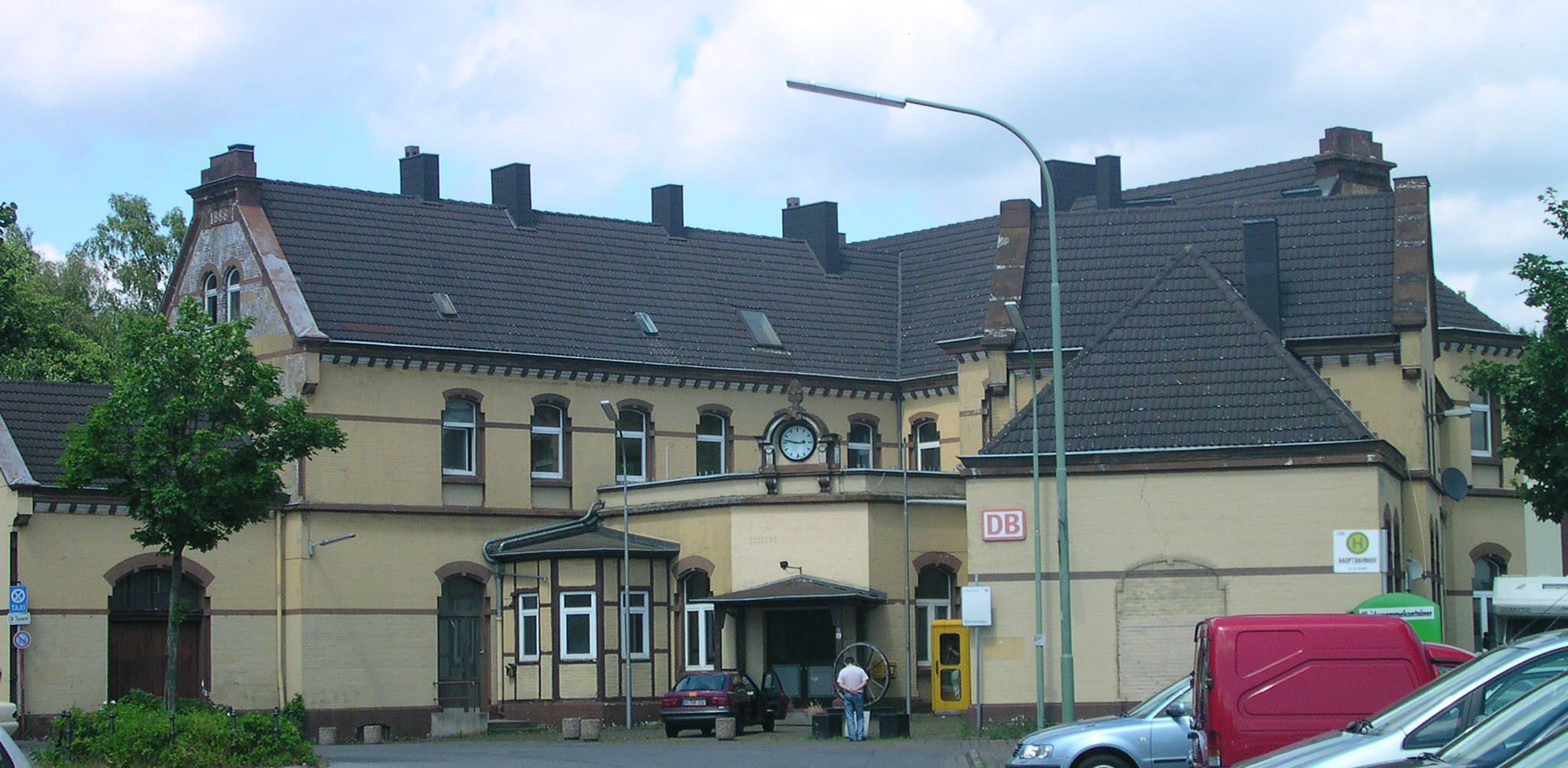
- Station building in 2006

General information
- Location: Stolberg (Rhineland), NRW; Germany
- Coordinates: 50°47′41″N 6°13′07″E
- Owner: DB Netz
- Operator: DB Station&Service
- Lines: Cologne–Aachen; Mönchengladbach–Stolberg; Stolberg–Walheim; Stolberg–Herzogenrath; Stolberg–Kohlscheid; Stolberg–Münsterbusch
- Platforms: 4

Construction
- Accessible: Yes

Other information
- Station code: 6037
- DS100 code: KST
- Category: 4
- Website: www.bahnhof.de

History
- Opened: 1888; 138 years ago

Services
Preceding station	DB Regio NRW	Following station
Aachen-Rothe Erde towards Aachen Hbf	RE 9	Eschweiler Hbf towards Siegen Hbf
Eilendorf towards Heerlen or Alsdorf Poststraße	RB 20	Stolberg-Schneidmühle towards Stolberg-Altstadt
Eilendorf towards Heerlen or Alsdorf Poststraße	RB 20	Eschweiler-West towards Düren
Preceding station	National Express Germany	Following station
Aachen-Rothe Erde towards Aachen Hbf	RE 1 (NRW-Express)	Eschweiler Hbf towards Hamm (Westf) Hbf
Location
- Location within North Rhine-Westphalia

Stolberg (Rheinland) Hauptbahnhof is a railway station on the line between Cologne and Aachen. It is the largest station for passengers and freight in the town of Stolberg (Rhineland) in the urban region of Aachen in the German state of North Rhine-Westphalia. It houses the Vennbahn Museum and is situated at a junction.

== Routes ==
Stolberger Hauptbahnhof is at the junction of four lines. The high-speed line between Cologne and Aachen runs from the east, first through the freight yard and then through the passenger station, and continues to the west. The Mönchengladbach–Stolberg line, called locally the Eschweiler Valley Railway (German: Eschweiler Talbahn) also runs into the station from the east. The Stolberg–Herzogenrath line runs from the north, first crossing the line between Cologne and Aachen and running to south of the main line to the west end of the station. The former Stolberg–Kohlscheid line also branched off this line at Quinx junction between Stolberg and Würselen-Merzbrück. The fourth line is the Stolberg–Eupen line, which leaves the station and runs to the south.

== History ==
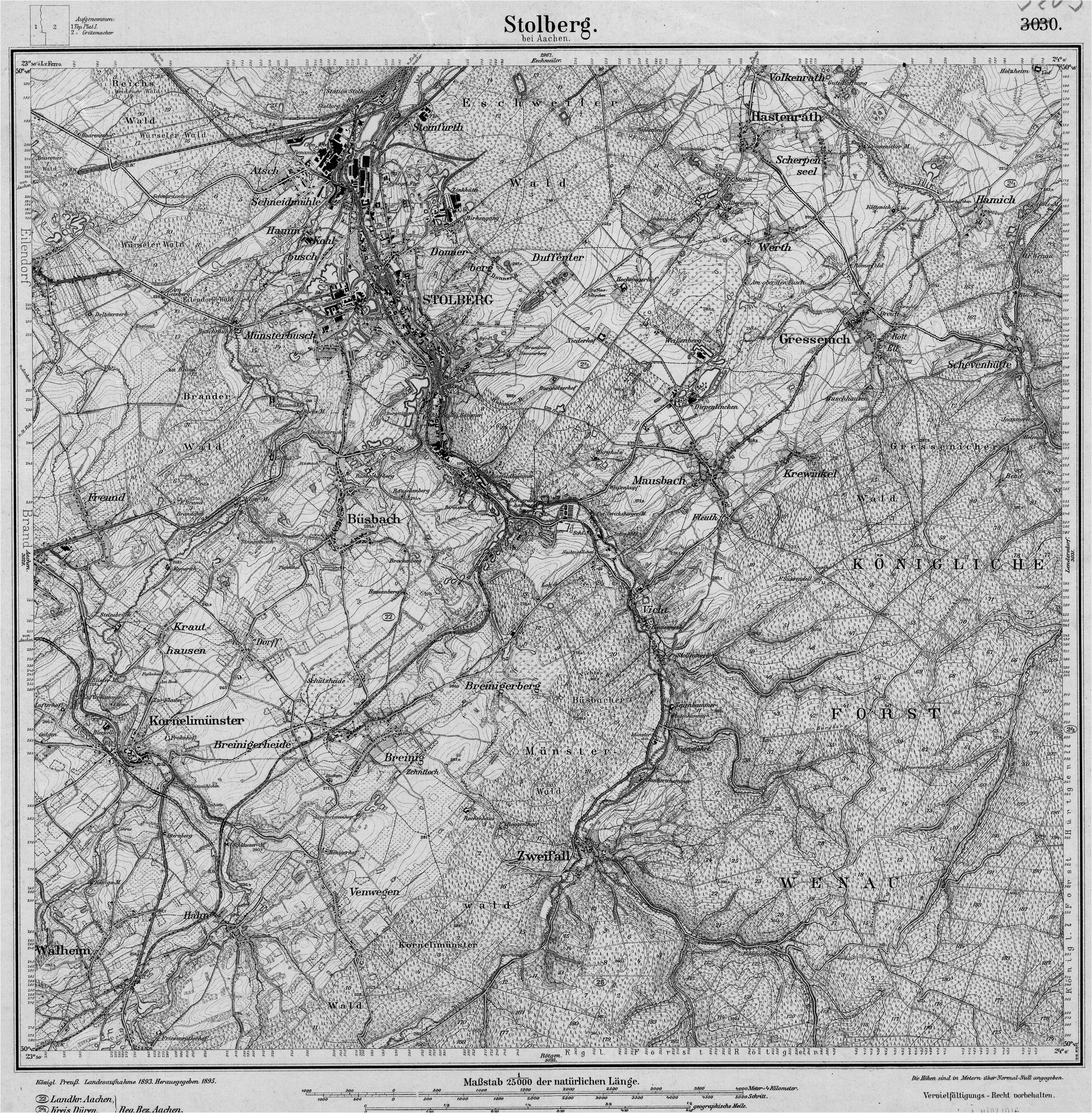
Stolberg in 1900

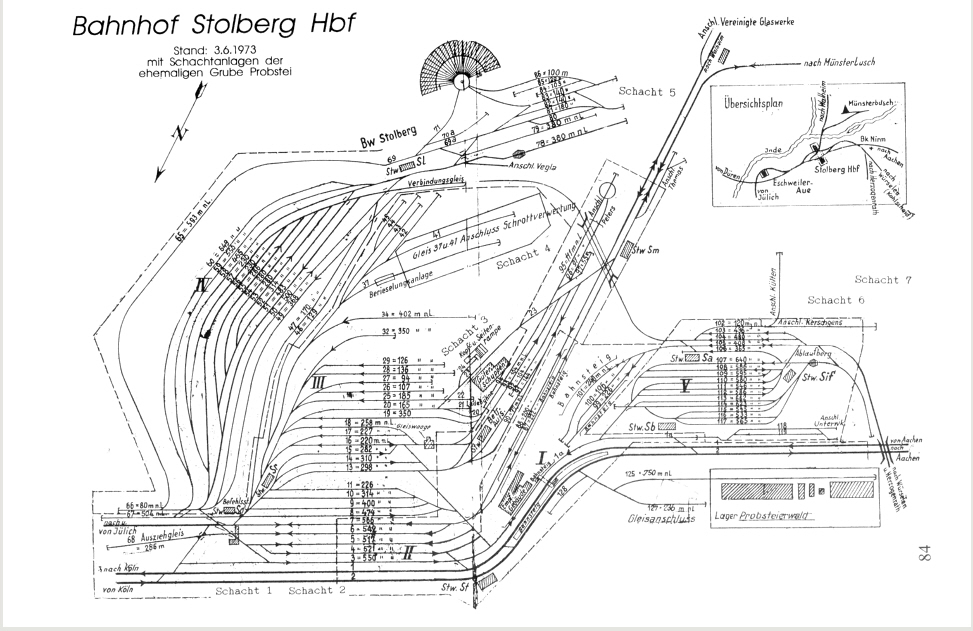
Station and tracks in 1973

The then single-track railway line between Cologne and Aachen was opened by the Rhenish Railway Company (German: Rheinische Eisenbahn-Gesellschaft, RHE) to Stolberg in 1841 with Stolberg station built in Eilendorf about one kilometre from the northern border of the town of Stolberg and therefore poorly located for the Stolberg valley. In 1870 the Bergisch-Märkische Railway Company (Bergisch-Märkische Eisenbahn-Gesellschaft, BME) opened the first part of the Hochneukirch–Stolberg line (known as the Eschweiler Talbahn, “Eschweiler Valley Railway”)—from Mönchengladbach, reaching Stolberg in 1875, where Stolberg BME station was built a few hundred metres south of Stolberg RHE station. Another short line was opened mainly for freight to Münsterbusch to the southwest of Stolberg in 1887 with its station near the other Stolberg stations.

The present station was built between 1886 and 1888 by the Prussian state railways. It replaced the previous three stations on the four different lines. In 1935 the station became part of the area of the city of Stolberg and since then it has been called Stolberg (Rheinland) Hauptbahnhof.

== Current operations ==
The Stolberg Hauptbahnhof is served by following passenger services:

Line	Name	Route	
RE 1	NRW-Express	Aachen – Stolberg (Rheinl) – Eschweiler – Düren – Cologne – Düsseldorf – Duisburg – Essen – Dortmund – Hamm (Westf) (– Paderborn)	
RE 9	Rhein-Sieg-Express	Aachen – Stolberg (Rheinl) – Eschweiler – Düren – Cologne – Siegburg/Bonn – Au (Sieg) – Siegen	
RB 20	Euregiobahn	Heerlen / Alsdorf-Annapark – Herzogenrath – Aachen – Stolberg (Rheinl) (coupled/uncoupled)	– Stolberg Altstadt
RB 20	Euregiobahn	Heerlen / Alsdorf-Annapark – Herzogenrath – Aachen – Stolberg (Rheinl) (coupled/uncoupled)	– Eschweiler-Tal – Langerwehe (– Düren)

Thalys services between Paris and Cologne and Intercity-Express services between Frankfurt and Brussels pass through without stopping.
