= Eilendorf station =

Railway station in Germany

Eilendorf
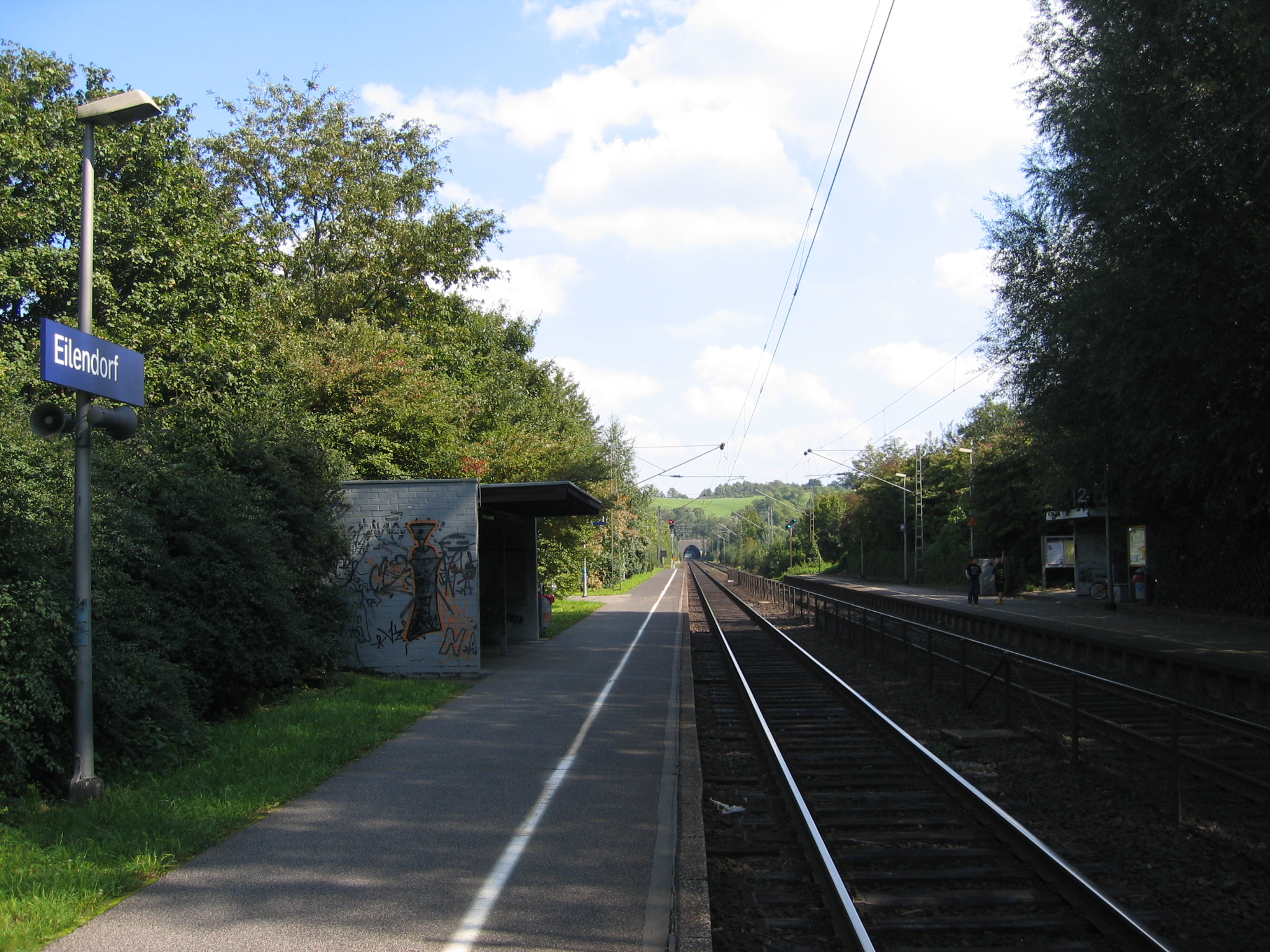

General information
- Location: Hansmannstr.23; 52080 Aachen; Aachen, North Rhine-Westphalia; Germany
- Coordinates: 50°47′8.35″N 6°9′17.53″E
- Owner: Deutsche Bahn
- Operator: DB Netz; DB Station&Service
- Lines: Cologne – Aachen (D2600) RB 20 (KBS 482)
- Platforms: 2 side platforms
- Tracks: 2

Other information
- Station code: 1515
- DS100 code: KEIL
- Category: 5
- Fare zone: AVV: Aachen; VRS: 3100 (AVV transitional tariff)
- Website: www.bahnhof.de

History
- Opened: 1 September 1841

Services
Preceding station	DB Regio NRW	Following station
Aachen-Rothe Erde towards Heerlen or Alsdorf Poststraße	RB 20	Stolberg (Rheinland) Hbf towards Langerwehe/Düren or Stolberg Altstadt
Location

Eilendorf station is a station in the German state of North Rhine-Westphalia on the Cologne–Aachen high-speed railway. It is located in the eastern Aachen district of Eilendorf near the districts of Brand, Rothe Erde and Verlautenheide.

== Location and facilities ==
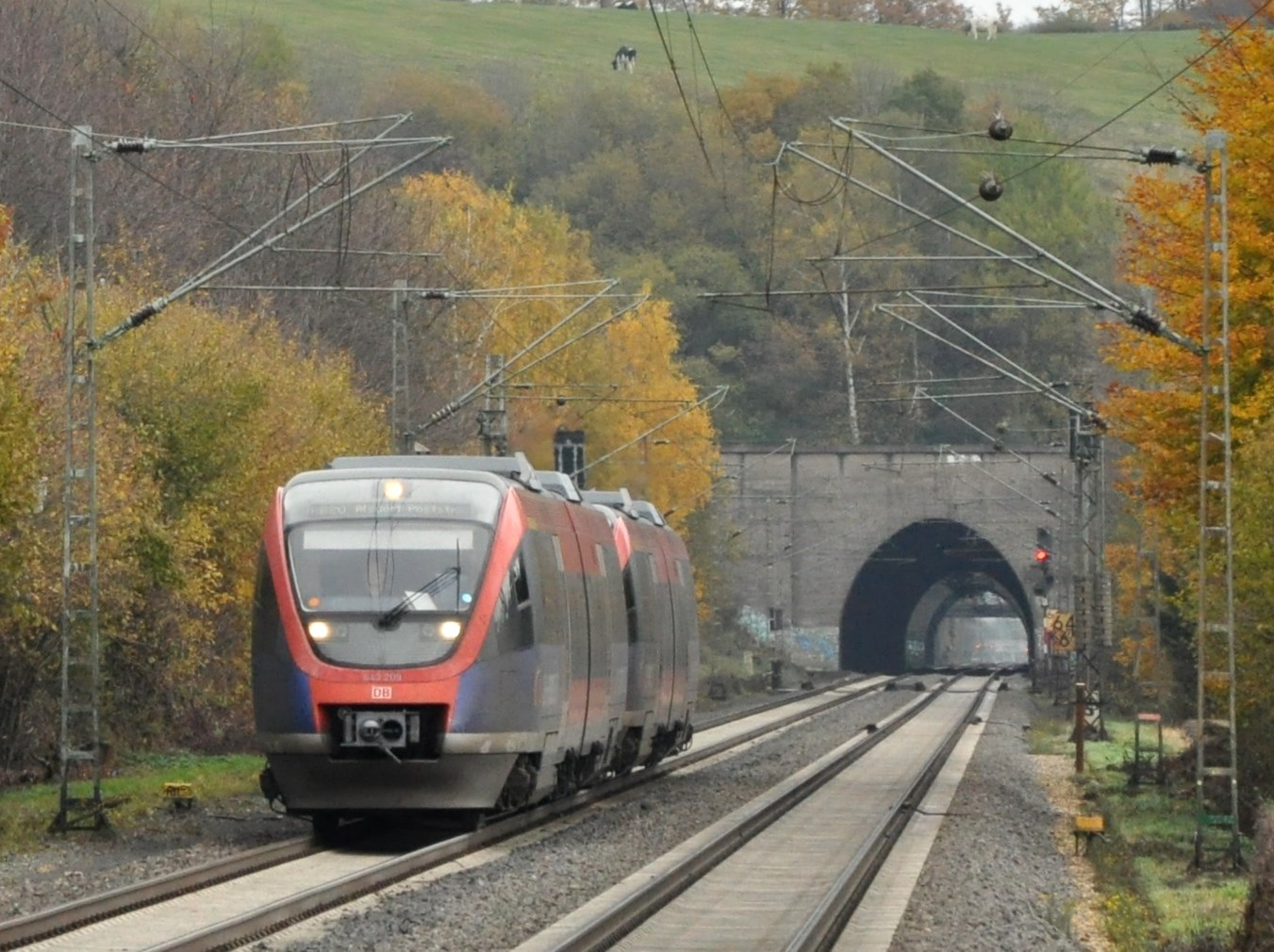
View from the platform towards Eilendorf Tunnel

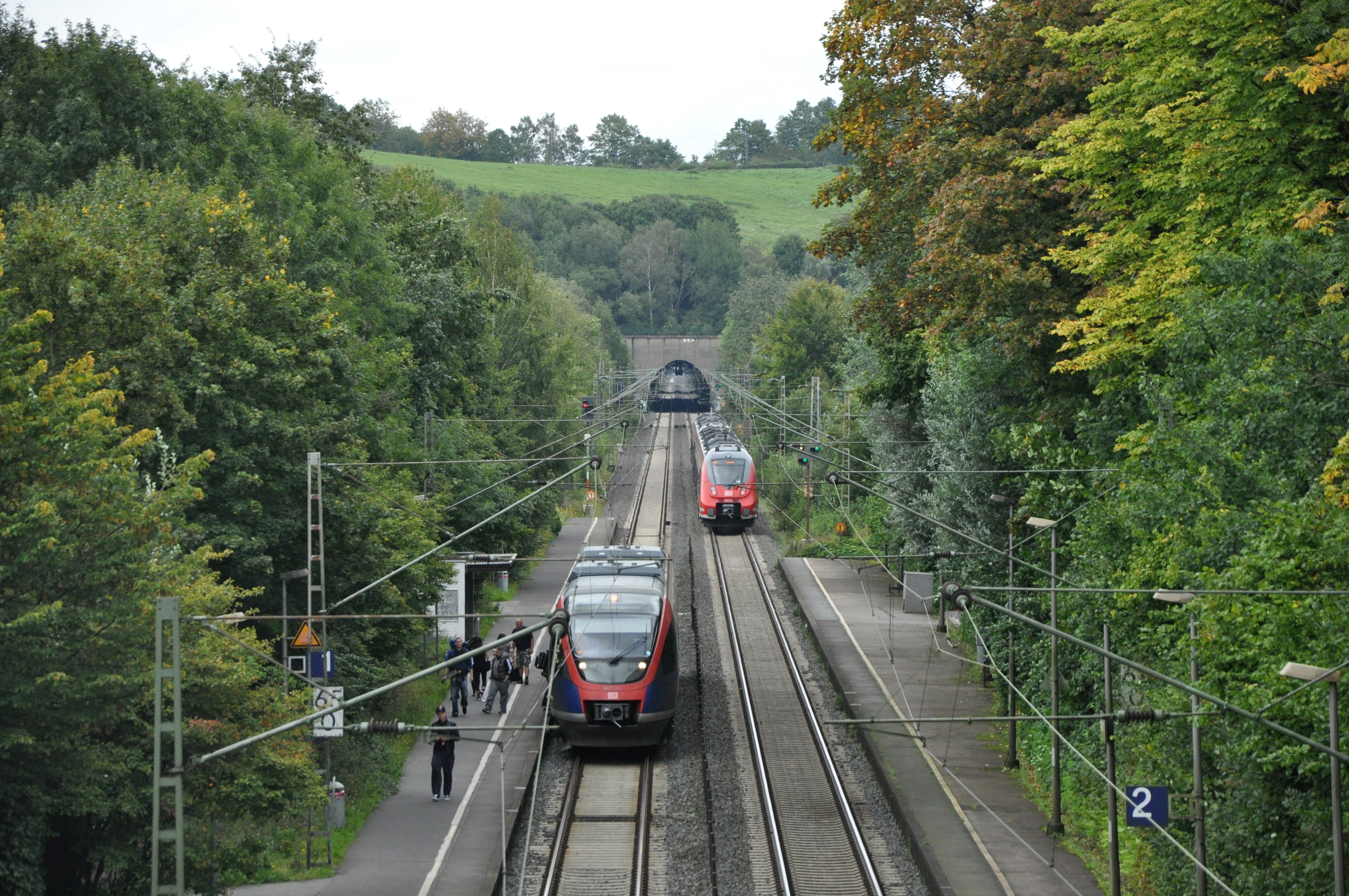
View from the road bridge

The halt (Haltepunkt, technically a station without points) of Eilendorf is on the Cologne–Aachen high-speed line north of the centre of Eilendorf. The district of Nirm borders to the north. The Eilendorf Tunnel ends to the east of the station. The Eilendorf Bahnhof bus stop of Aachener Straßenbahn und Energieversorgungs-AG, the Aachen municipal bus company, lies to the west, about 200 metres (656 ft 2 in) from the platforms.

The station has two tracks, each of which is faced by a 125 m (410 ft 1 in) long side platform. There is a waiting room, a ticket machine and a one-line, digital passenger information system on every platform. Noise barriers are installed on the northern platform. The platforms are monitored by video. There are also lockable bicycle boxes behind both platforms.

There is a slope next to the railway line. While the entrances, which are each in the middle of a platform, are at ground level, the line toward Aachen rises from Eilendorf station, but after the station it is below the surrounding ground. The tracks cannot be crossed at the station itself, so passengers must use a bridge to the west or an underpass to the east.

The straight line to Eilendorf Tunnel and Nirm Tunnel can be seen from the eastern end of the platforms.

== History ==
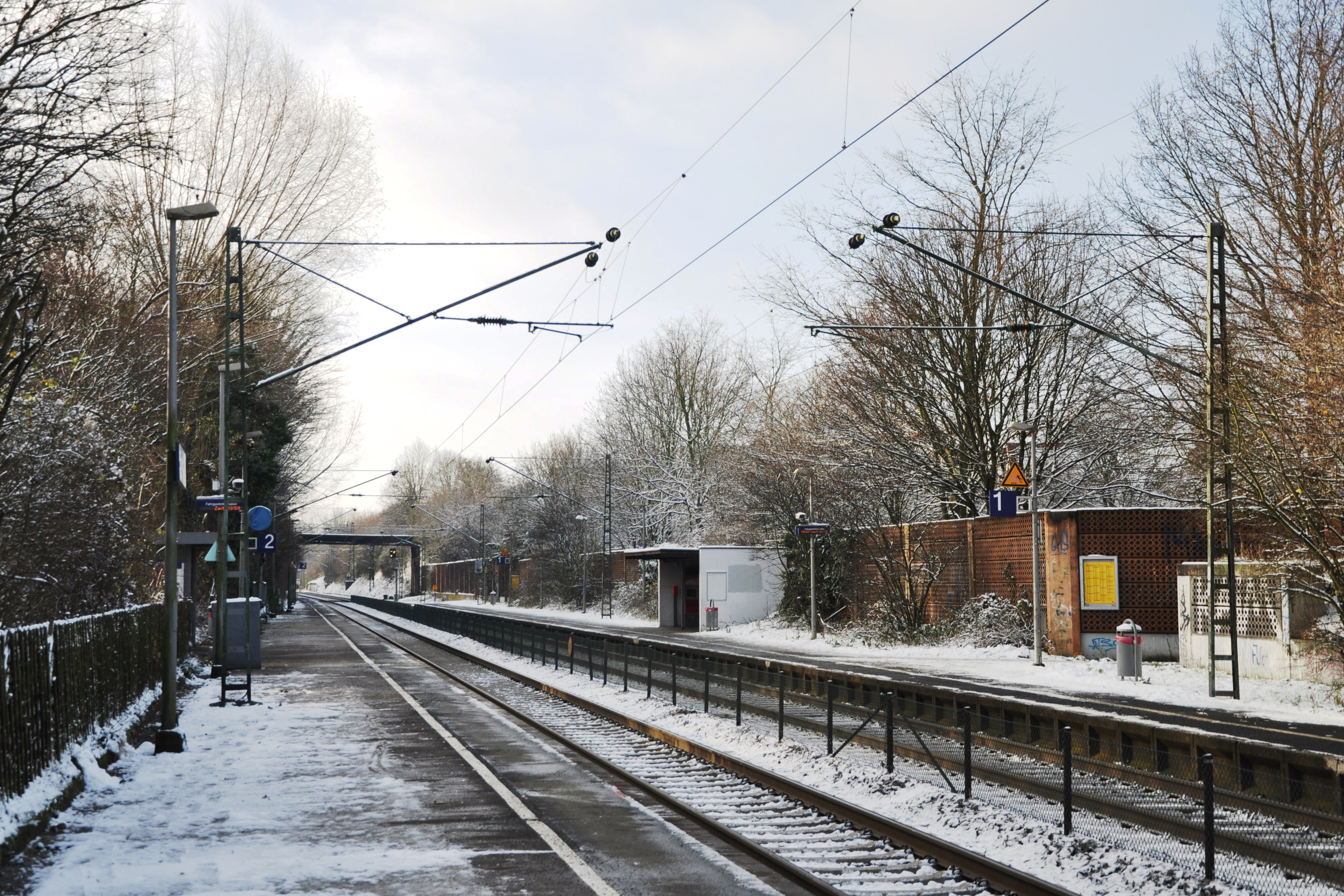
Eilendorf station in December 2012

The Rhenish Railway Company (Rheinische Eisenbahn-Gesellschaft) opened the railway from Cologne to Aachen on 1 September 1841. A halt was opened at the time called Nirm, which was renamed Eilendorf in 1865. With the building of a siding to a neighbouring sawmill, Eilendorf halt was redesignated as a station.

The original, one-story station building was opened on the south side of the station in April 1897. In the meantime, passenger services were discontinued at Eilendorf station, but they resumed in 1897. A new, larger entrance building was built by Deutsche Reichsbahn in about 1920. At that time, Eilendorf station had an island platform between the two tracks, a bypass track and a track for freight handling. The latter was located at the first station building built in 1897.

Eilendorf station received its current form during the electrification of the Cologne–Aachen line, which took place from 1963 to 1966. Two side platforms were replaced by a central platform. All track infrastructure, except for the platform tracks, was dismantled and the station was redesignated as a halt. The station building was demolished in 1988.

A stop of the Regional-Express RE 9 Rhein-Sieg-Express service was established in Eilendorf in 2003. Shortly afterwards, demands were made for a second Regional-Express stop in Eilendorf and subsequently the RE 1 NRW-Express stopped there, thus establishing a 30-minute cycle to Cologne. The RE 9's stop in Eilendorf was discontinued at the 2009 timetable change.

The platforms were increased from 38 cm (15 in) to 76 cm (30 in) to enable a level, barrier-free entry into the trains in 2018. The platforms, which were previously over 200 m (656 ft 2 in) long, were shortened to 125 m (410 ft 1 in).

== Current operations ==
Eilendorf station is served by following passenger services:

Line	Name	Route	
RB 20	Euregiobahn	Eschweiler-St.Jöris – Herzogenrath – Aachen – Eilendorf – Stolberg (Rheinl) (coupled/uncoupled)	– Stolberg Altstadt
RB 20	Euregiobahn	Eschweiler-St.Jöris – Herzogenrath – Aachen – Eilendorf – Stolberg (Rheinl) (coupled/uncoupled)	– Eschweiler-Tal – Langerwehe (– Düren)
