= Eschweiler Hauptbahnhof =

Railway station in Eschweiler, Germany

Eschweiler Hbf
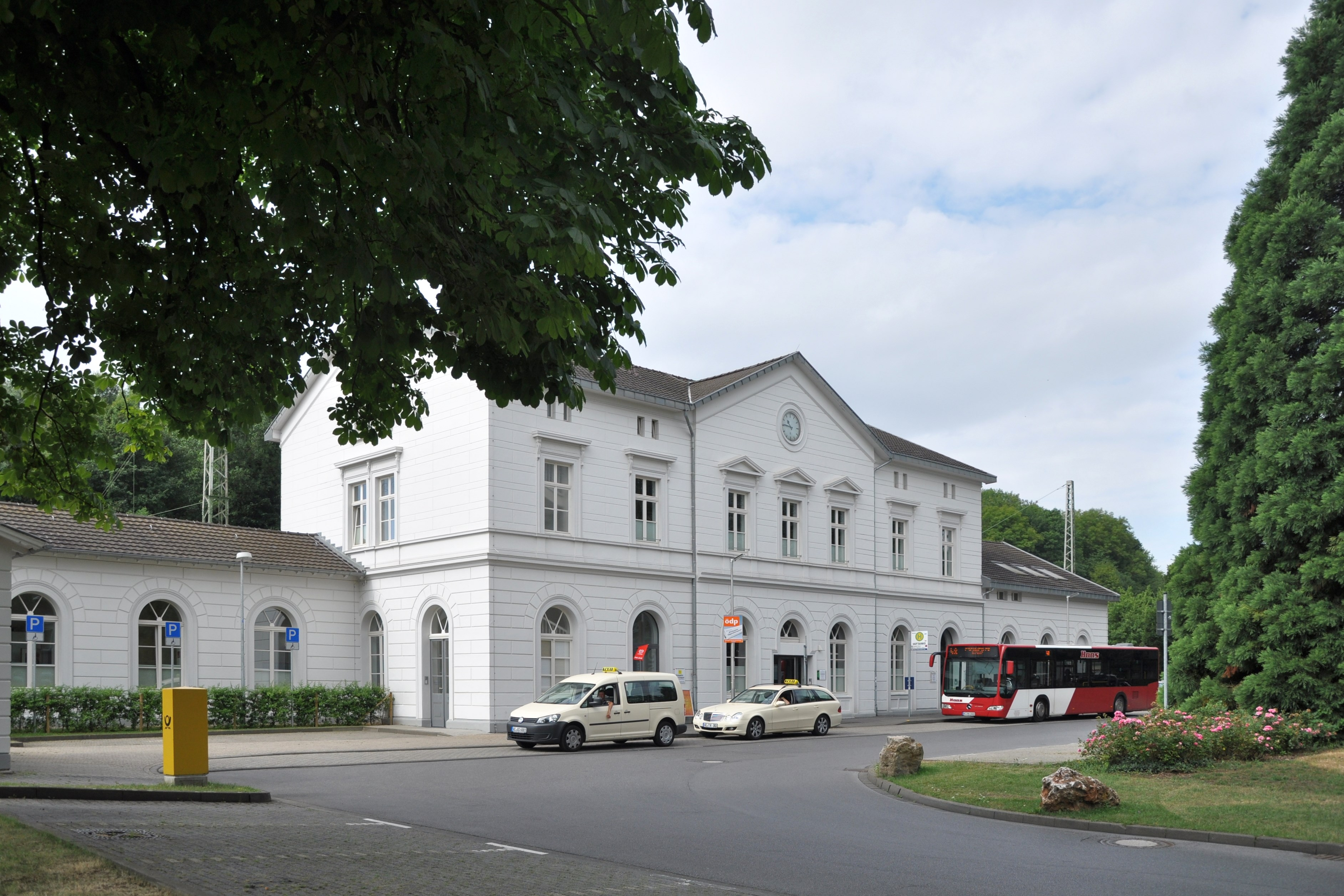
- Station building in 2013 after its renovation

General information
- Location: Eschweiler, NRW; Germany
- Coordinates: 50°48′48″N 6°15′8″E
- Owner: DB Netz
- Operator: DB Station&Service
- Line: Cologne–Aachen (KBS 480)
- Platforms: 3

Construction
- Accessible: Yes

Other information
- Station code: 1680
- DS100 code: KE
- Category: 4
- Fare zone: AVV: Eschweiler; VRS: 3160 (AVV transitional tariff)
- Website: www.bahnhof.de

History
- Opened: 1 September 1841; 184 years ago

Services
Preceding station	DB Regio NRW	Following station
Stolberg (Rheinland) Hbf towards Aachen Hbf	RE 9	Langerwehe towards Siegen Hbf
Preceding station	National Express Germany	Following station
Stolberg (Rheinland) Hbf towards Aachen Hbf	RE 1 (NRW-Express)	Langerwehe towards Hamm (Westf) Hbf
Location
- Location within North Rhine-Westphalia

Eschweiler Hauptbahnhof is the largest station in the city of Eschweiler in the German state of North Rhine-Westphalia. It is on a slight curve on the Cologne–Aachen high-speed line. Regional services of the Regional-Express lines RE 1 (NRW-Express) and RE 9 (Rhein-Sieg-Express) stop at the station every half hour in both directions.

The station is located about 700 metres (2,300 ft) from the city centre in the district of Röthgen. The station is less than 100 metres (330 ft) from the Ichenberg Tunnel. About 700 metres (2,300 ft) away is Eschweiler-West station on the remaining section of the Mönchengladbach–Stolberg railway, which is now served by euregiobahn trains.

On 24 March 1987, the former station toilets block, together with the former petroleum facility, was added to the heritage list of the town of Eschweiler.

== History ==
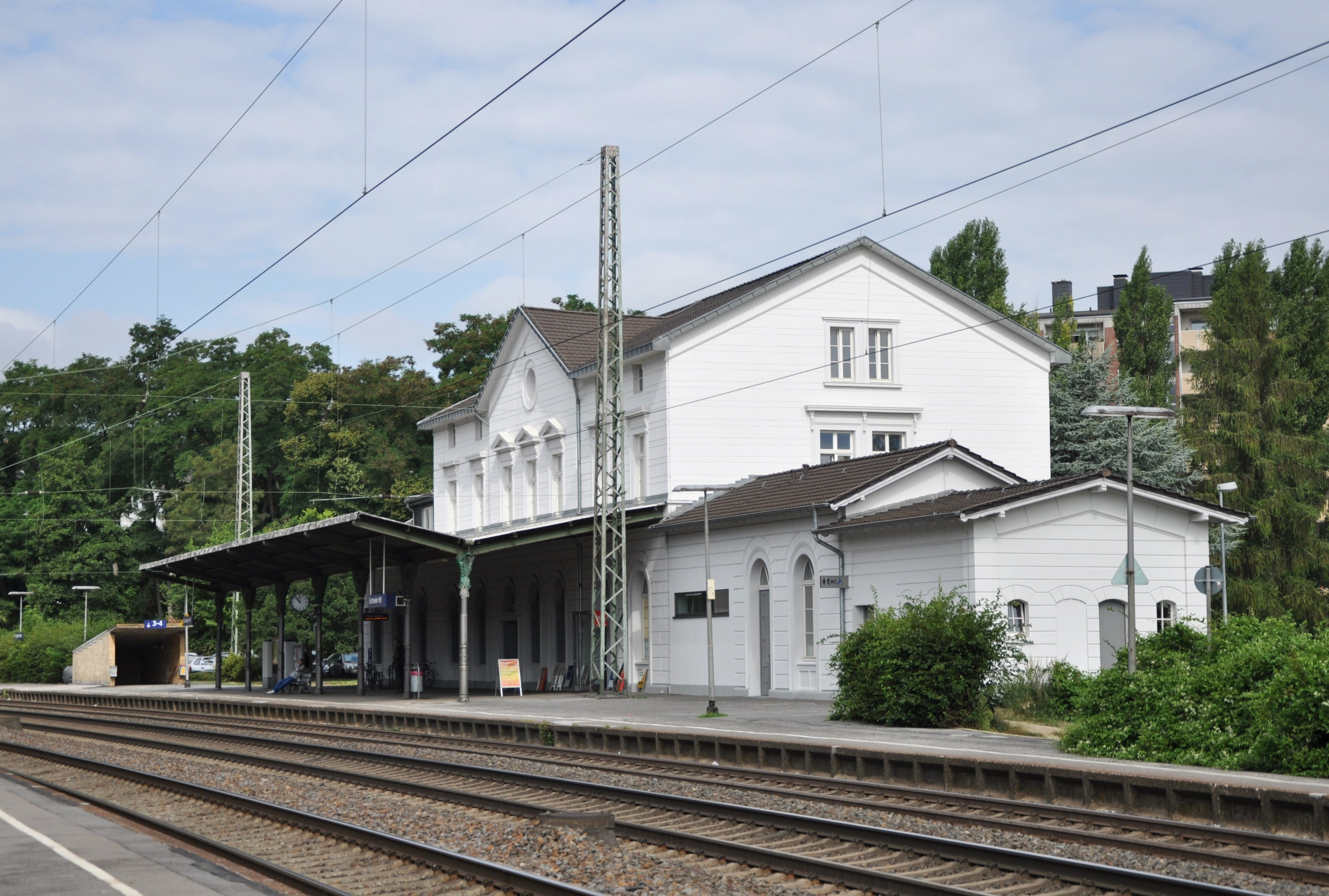
Station building

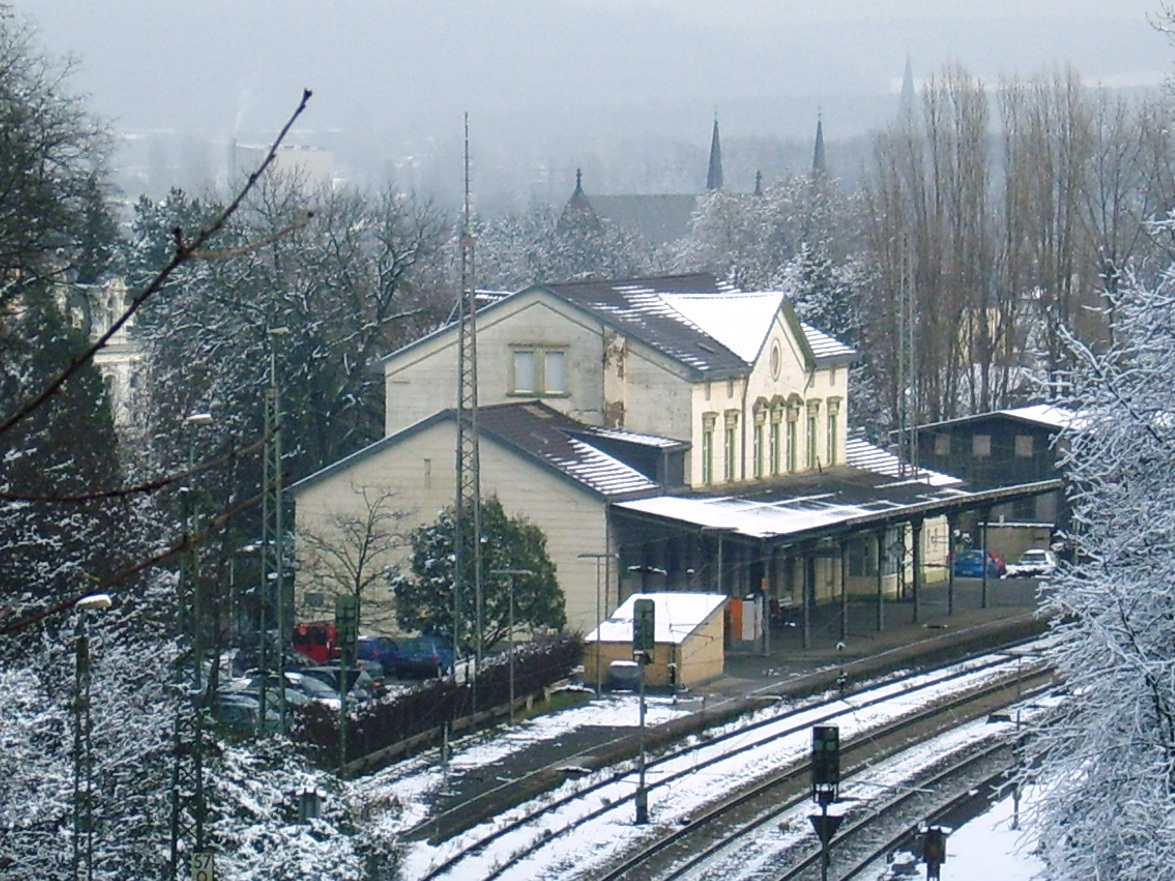
View from Ichenberg Tunnel

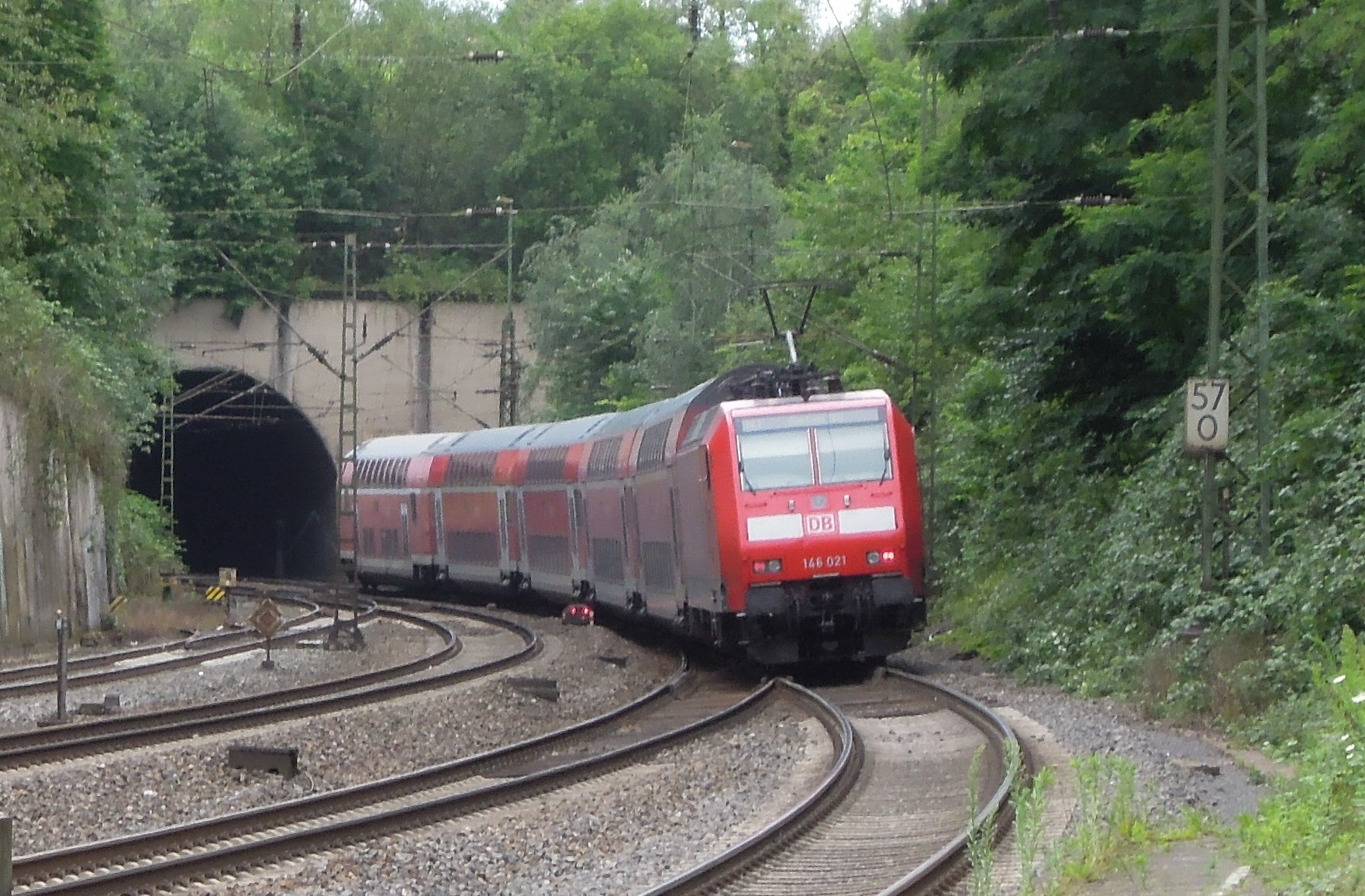
Ichenberg Tunnel with Regional-Express (track 1)

On 1 April 1841, a mail service was established between Eschweiler and Stolberg with ran at 7 am and 7 pm daily. Eschweiler was at the beginning of an expansion of its coal mining industry, stimulated by industrial growth. In 1835 the Eschweiler Mining Association had been founded and the population nearly tripled from 1800 to 1850. In due course, the Aachen, Inde and Wurm mining districts were connected by railway.

In mid-1841, a railway tunnel was built through the Ichenberg ridge in the course of building the railway and on 22 August, after the Rhenish Railway Company (German: Rheinische Eisenbahn-Gesellschaft, RHE) completed construction of its trunk line between Cologne and Aachen, the first test train ran from Cologne to Aachen through the Eschweiler area. The line officially opened on 1 September as a single track to Eschweiler station. There were two daily trains in each direction and seven horse-drawn omnibus trips ran daily to carry postal traffic between the station and the town—which was essentially only the old town north of the Inde—these also carried passengers. The bus operations closed in 1878. Freight operations started on 2 November 1841. In 1844, the line was duplicated.

=== Expansion and change of name ===
The station building was extended in 1858 and 1860. A new station building was opened in 1872, which is still used. On 1 October 1873, the second railway to Eschweiler was opened. The Bergisch-Märkische Railway Company (Bergisch-Märkische Eisenbahn-Gesellschaft, BME ) opened the Hochneukirch–Stolberg line (known as the Eschweiler Talbahn, “Eschweiler Valley Railway”)—part of which is now served by euregiobahn trains—from Eschweiler-Aue via Eschweiler-Tal (now: Eschweiler-Talbahnhof/Raiffeisenplatz), Weisweiler (now: Eschweiler-Weisweiler), Frenz, Jülich und Hochneukirch to Rheydt-Odenkirchen. This second line runs through Eschweiler about 500 m north of and parallel with the main line and passes under it at the Dreibogenbrücke (“three-arch bridge”) in the district of Aue. None of the current stations in Eschweiler is on both lines.

In 1897 the Aachen Tramway opened a tram line between Eschweiler Rathaus (town hall) and the main station. In 1911, the station was renamed Eschweiler Hauptbahnhof.

=== During the occupation ===
Following the signing of the armistice at the end of the First World War on 11 November 1918 railway services were closed from 1 to 19 December and French and Belgian troops occupied Eschweiler.

On 22 January 1923 the line was closed again, after the French occupation forces took over the operation of the railway. In October there was a coup attempt by separatists, who wanted to establish a Rhenish Republic. On 16 November 1924 management of the railway was returned to Deutsche Reichsbahn.

=== Second World War ===
On 21 November 1944 the Sticher Berg railway bridge, the “three-arch bridge” and the Ichenberg tunnel were blown up by retreating German troops. In March 1945, American pioneers made temporary repairs to the three-arch bridge and rail traffic was resumed.

=== Post-war period ===
The tram line to the Hauptbahnhof was reopened in 1948 following the rebuilding of the destroyed bridge over the Inde and was operated as line 22 (Vaals–Eilendorf–Atsch–Eschweiler Hauptbahnhof) by Aachener Straßenbahn und Energieversorgungs-AG (the Aachen public transport operator). But in 1954 the tramway was closed and replaced by buses.

On 1 July 1958 the German army took full control of the Donnerberg barracks from the Belgian army, and Eschweiler became a garrison town, providing extra traffic for Eschweiler Hauptbahnhof. In August 1962 work started on the removal of the roof of the Ichenberg Tunnel for 255 m of its length for the electrification of the main line and the construction of a new tunnel with a length of 90 m. Since 18 May 1966 the line has been fully electrified from Cologne to Aachen.

In the 1970s, the extension of the main hall was demolished.

On 4 May 1985 a ceremony was held at the town hall establishing a partnership with the English local government district of Reigate and Banstead and on 26 September 1989 the redesigned station forecourt, which then had 147 parking places, was renamed Reigate-Banstead-Platz.

After the purchase of the station building by the town of Eschweiler, it was rebuilt in 2007 and 2008: it now includes a newspaper stand, toilets, a ticket office, a dental practice and other offices. The ticket office was re-opened on 16 June 2008 and at the same time the parking lot was expanded by about 40 places.

== Tracks ==
The Eschweiler Hauptbahnhof has four tracks:

- track 1 is served by trains to Aachen
- track 2 is a main through track (usually running towards Aachen) without a platform
- track 3 is used by stopping and non-stopping trains towards Cologne
- track 4 is used in both directions, usually by freight trains so that they can be overtaken and sometimes by passenger trains.

== Current operations ==
The Eschweiler Hauptbahnhof is served by following passenger services:

Line	Name	Route
RE 1	NRW-Express	Aachen – Stolberg (Rheinl) – Eschweiler – Düren – Cologne – Düsseldorf – Duisburg – Essen – Dortmund – Hamm (Westf) (– Paderborn)
RE 9	Rhein-Sieg-Express	Aachen – Stolberg (Rheinl) – Eschweiler – Düren – Cologne;– Siegburg/Bonn – Au (Sieg) – Siegen
EW4	City bus	Eschweiler Hbf – Kreisaltenheim – Talbahnhof/Raiffeisenplatz – CityCenter/Rathaus – Eschweiler Bushof – Röhe – Aue/St. Jöris
48	Bus	Eschweiler Bushof – St.-Antonius-Hospital – Eschweiler-West – Eschweiler Hbf – Pumpe-Stich – Donnerbergkaserne – Donnerberg – Stolberg Mühlener Bf

The station is served by steam excursions of Dampfbahn Rur-Wurm-Inde e. V. Thalys services between Paris and Cologne and Intercity-Express services between Frankfurt and Brussels pass through without stopping.
