= Langerwehe station =

Railway station in Langerwehe, Germany

Langerwehe
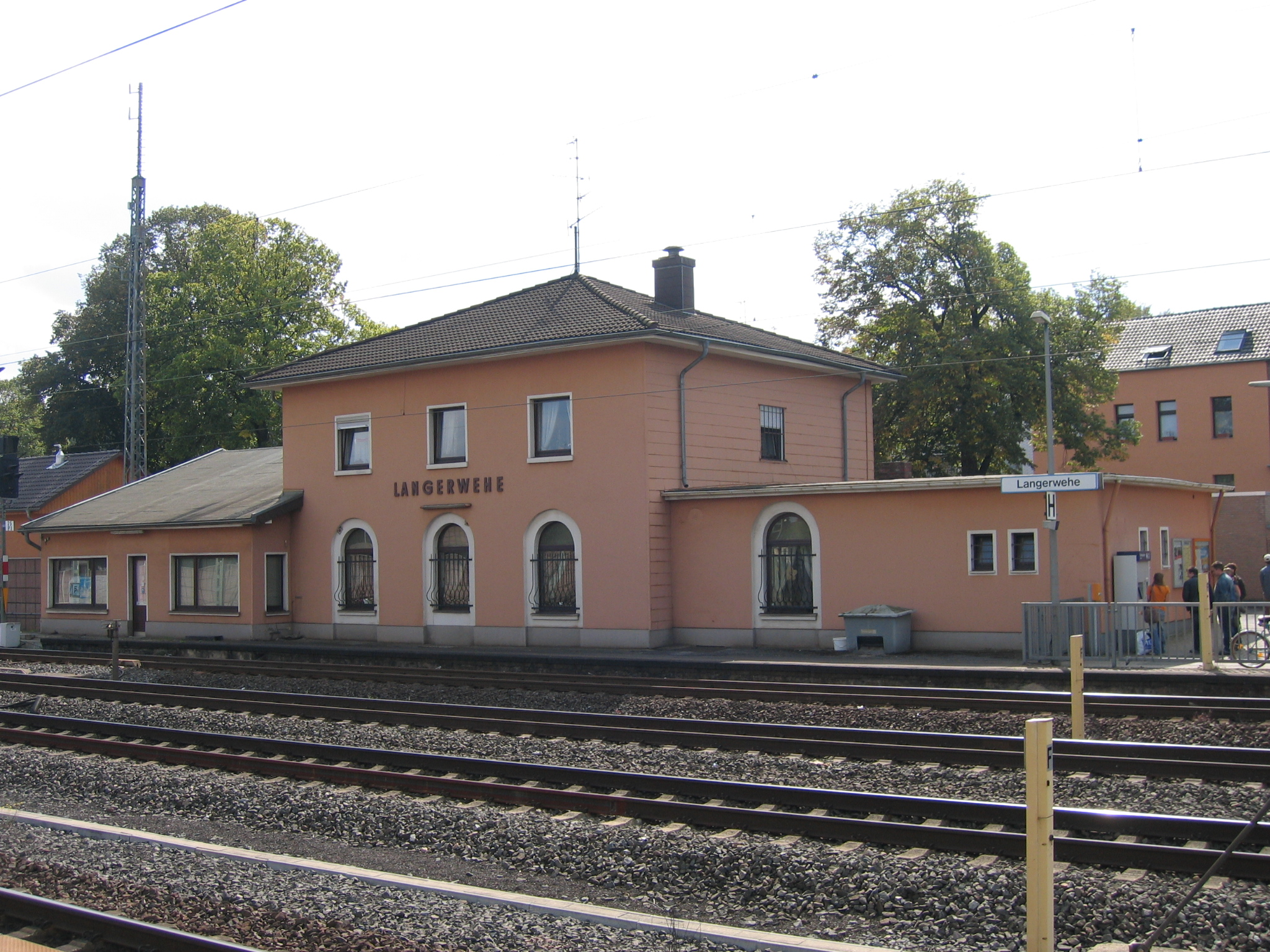
- Former station building

General information
- Location: Bahnhofsplatz 14, Langerwehe, NRW; Germany
- Coordinates: 50°49′03″N 6°21′19″E
- Lines: Cologne–Aachen (48.9 km); Eschweiler-Weisweiler–Langerwehe
- Platforms: 3

Construction
- Accessible: Yes

Other information
- Station code: 3557
- DS100 code: KLAW
- IBNR: 8003553
- Category: 4
- Fare zone: AVV: 87; VRS: 3610 (AVV transitional tariff)
- Website: www.bahnhof.de

History
- Opened: 1 September 1841; 184 years ago

Services
| Preceding station | DB Regio NRW | Following station |
|---|---|---|
| Eschweiler Hbf towards Aachen Hbf | RE 9 | Düren towards Siegen Hbf |
| Eschweiler-Weisweiler towards Heerlen or Alsdorf Poststraße | RB 20 | Düren towards Düren or Stolberg Altstadt |
| Preceding station | National Express Germany | Following station |
| Eschweiler Hbf towards Aachen Hbf | RE 1 (NRW-Express) | Düren towards Hamm (Westf) Hbf |
Location
- Location within North Rhine-Westphalia

Langerwehe station is located in North Rhine-Westphalia, Germany, along the Cologne–Aachen high-speed railway. Situated in the centre of Langerwehe in the district of Düren, it lies about 25 km east of Aachen.

== History ==
The station was originally built in 1841 to coincide with the completion of the Cologne–Aachen railway. Its two-story central station building dates from this time. Initially serving primarily freight traffic between the Belgian city of Antwerp and the Rhineland, a freight house was also established, which was partly used for the temporary storage of wood for the nearby coal mines of the Aachen district.

By the late 19th century, passenger traffic had grown significantly. As a result, the station was expanded in the early 20th century, including a two-story extension to the station building. Over time, the freight house fell into disuse, and parts were demolished.

During the 1990s and early 2000s, the Cologne–Aachen line was upgraded to a high-speed route. Two additional tracks were built at Langerwehe station for uninterrupted passage of high-speed trains, such as the Intercity-Express and Thalys, Two new side platform were built for passenger services, track 1 (towards Cologne) and 4 (towards Aachen), each 220 metres long and interconnected by a pedestrian tunnel.

The latest renovation in 2009 created a new platform track 5 with a bus station and a "park and rail" parking area. Track 5 is adjacent to track 4, but separated from it by a sound barrier. This is a terminating track, used only by Euregiobahn services from Aachen ending in Langerwehe. These services connect to the main line a few hundred metres west of the station. These services can also run to the station on track 4 and, since the timetable change of December 2009, half of the Euregiobahn services operate to Düren.

== Current operations ==
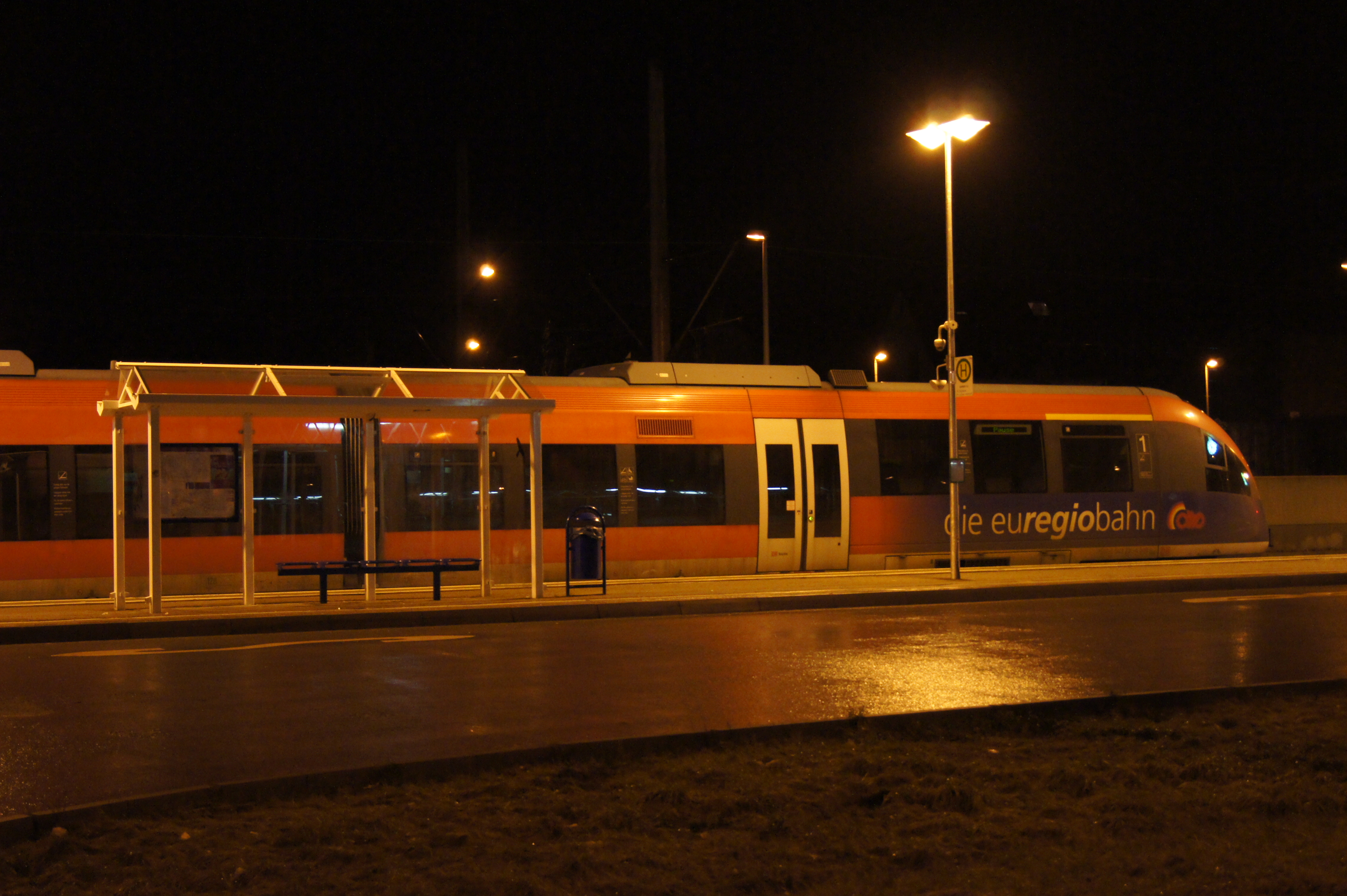
Euregiobahn service at night in Langerwehe

Langerwehe station is currently served exclusively by regional trains: each hour it is served by NRW-Express (RE 1) and Rhein-Sieg-Express (RE 9) services. In addition Langerwehe is served by Euregiobahn services on the Eschweiler Valley Railway from Weisweiler every half hour on the new line. These services continue every hour to Düren.

| Line | Name | Route | |
|---|---|---|---|
| RE 1 | NRW-Express | Aachen – Langerwehe – Düren – Cologne – Düsseldorf – Duisburg – Essen – Dortmund – Hamm (Westf) (– Paderborn) | |
| RE 9 | Rhein-Sieg-Express | Aachen – Langerwehe – Düren – Cologne – Siegburg/Bonn – Au (Sieg) – Siegen | |
| RB 20 | Euregiobahn | Heerlen / Alsdorf-Annapark – Herzogenrath – Aachen – Aachen-Rothe Erde – Stolberg (Rheinl) (coupled/uncoupled) | – Stolberg Altstadt |
| RB 20 | Euregiobahn | Heerlen / Alsdorf-Annapark – Herzogenrath – Aachen – Aachen-Rothe Erde – Stolberg (Rheinl) (coupled/uncoupled) | – Eschweiler-Tal – Langerwehe (– Düren) |
