= NRW-Express =

Regional-Express service in North Rhine-Westphalia

RE 1 NRW-Express
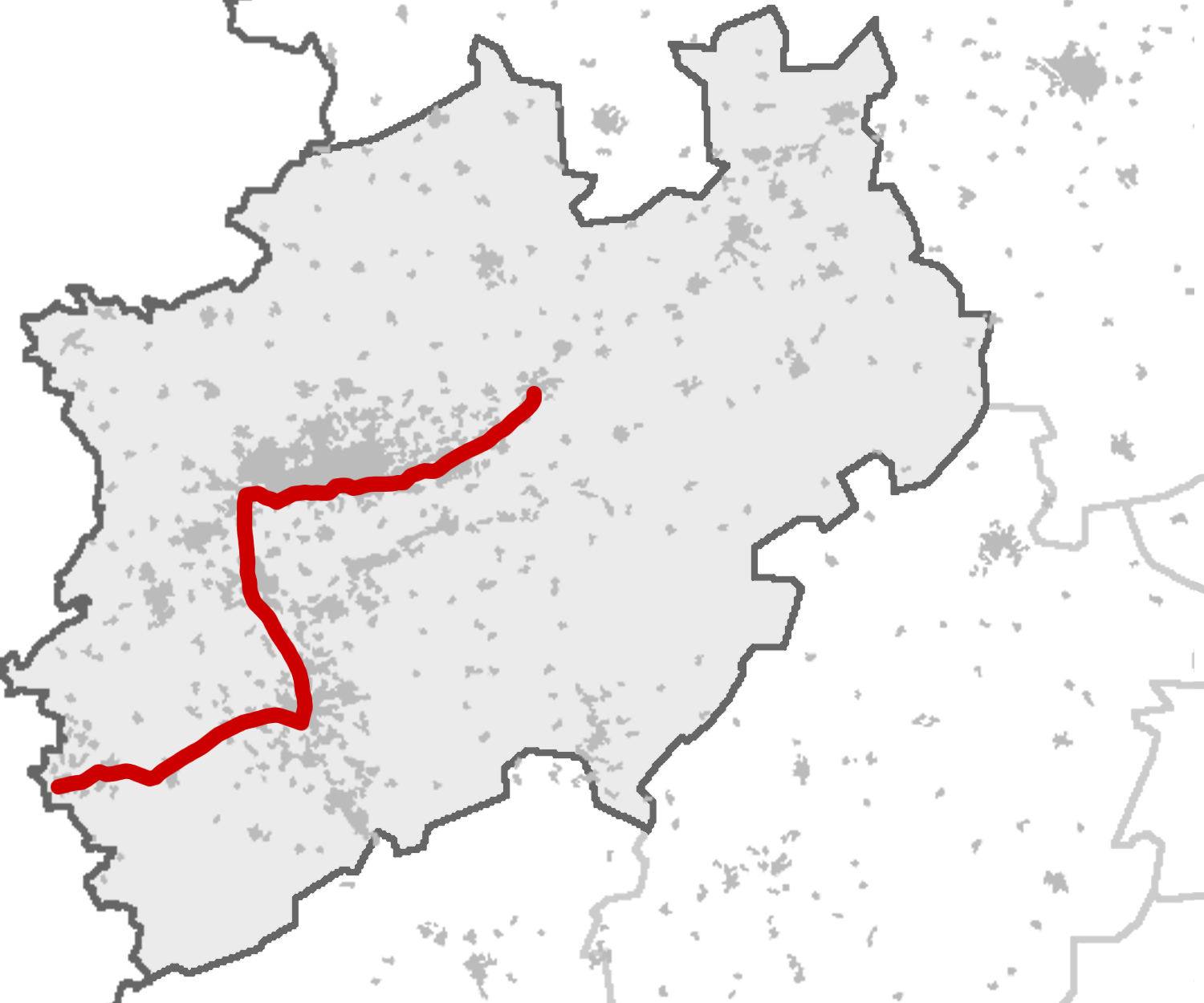

Overview
- Locale: North Rhine-Westphalia, Germany

Service
- Route number: 480 (Aachen–Köln); 415 (Köln–Hamm); 430 (Hamm–Warburg)

Technical
- Line length: 218 km (135 mi)
- Operating speed: 160 km/h (99 mph) (maximum)

The NRW-Express is a Regional-Express rail service in the German state of North Rhine-Westphalia (NRW), running from Aachen via Cologne, Düsseldorf, Duisburg, Essen, Bochum and Dortmund to Hamm as line RE 1. The line is part of the Rhein Ruhr Express (RRX) network and is operated by National Express.

The service has one of the highest levels of patronage in Germany with about 110,000 passengers per day, mainly commuters and students.

== History ==
Today's NRW-Express replaced existing express services on individual sections of the route after the regionalisation of transport in Germany. A number of stations previously served by long-distance trains, such as Düsseldorf-Benrath and Wattenscheid came to be served by regional services only. The NRW-Express was first classified as Regionalschnellbahn ("regional fast train") RSB 1, then as StadtExpress ("city express") SE 1 and eventually as Regional-Express RE 1, when it was also given the name of NRW-Express.

The service originally operated on the Aachen–Bielefeld route and was composed of class 110 locomotives hauling six partly modernised Silberling carriages. If necessary, trains had an additional carriage. From the mid-90s, the trains were formed of non air-conditioned double-deck carriages and class 111 locomotives. Shortly later control cars were added, so that push–pull operations could be introduced. From 1998, air-conditioned double-deck carriages were introduced, but only after Expo 2000 in Hanover were all services of the NRW-Express operated with new air-conditioned carriages equipped to operate at 160 km/h. The sets were now mostly hauled by class 146 locomotives, which had originally been supplied for the Expo.

The class 145 locomotives, with their AC engines, had performed well on services at Expo 2000, so their introduction on the NRW-Express services was hoped to improve on-time running with their better acceleration. A passenger version of class 145, which has a top speed of 140 km/h (87 mph), was ordered as class 146 with a top speed of 160 km/h (99 mph) in the autumn of 2001 and was first used for the NRW-Express services.

RE 1 provided travel times that were very competitive with long-distance trains through North Rhine-Westphalia and had good connections in Bielefeld to Hanover, so the train on weekends was heavily used by long-distance travellers to Hamburg and Berlin as part of the so-called Wochenend-Ticket-Rennstrecke ("weekend-ticket race track"). This attractiveness became a problem since the trains were often overcrowded. An extension of the trains with an additional carriage failed to overcome this problem because the trains still used single-deck carriages and some platforms were too short for the extra carriage. At the time double-deck carriages were in short supply and their increased weight caused travel times to be extended (only during a few timetable periods were services formed with six double-deck carriages). The high loadings often meant that the scheduled stopping times were insufficient, so delays were created. Delays to long-distance trains also had a strong influence on the punctuality of the NRW-Express. The situation was aggravated several times when DB Regio tried to change the timetable by shortening the turnaround time in Bielefeld from 70 to 10 minutes to save a train set. These trials were always given up after a few weeks at the most.

With the timetable change in December 2002, the route was cut back from Bielefeld to Hamm. On the section that was eliminated, the NRW-Express was replaced by the newly created Westfalen-Express (RE 6) from Düsseldorf via Duisburg, Essen, Bochum, Dortmund, Hamm and Bielefeld to Minden. On the last section from Dortmund, the NRW-Express, however, now stopped only in Kamen, except every second hour it stopped at all five stations on the section. As a result of the shortening of the route of the trains, punctuality was significantly improved, although in the past most lost time could be made up between Hamm and Bielefeld. RE 1 therefore remains one of the lines in North Rhine-Westphalia that is most vulnerable to delay.

A bomb plot on the train in 2006 failed due to faulty construction.

From the timetable change in December 2010, services were extended to run every two hours between Hamm and Paderborn. In the off-peak, services have stopped east of Dortmund only at Dortmund-Scharnhorst, Dortmund-Kurl, Kamen-Methler and Nordbögge since 2010. The first morning service to Paderborn stopped at all stations between Hamm and Paderborn.

A sixth carriage was gradually introduced on each train between March 2011 and September 2011. This increased the capacity from 602 to 735 seats per train.

The section between Hamm and Paderborn was dropped in December 2016.

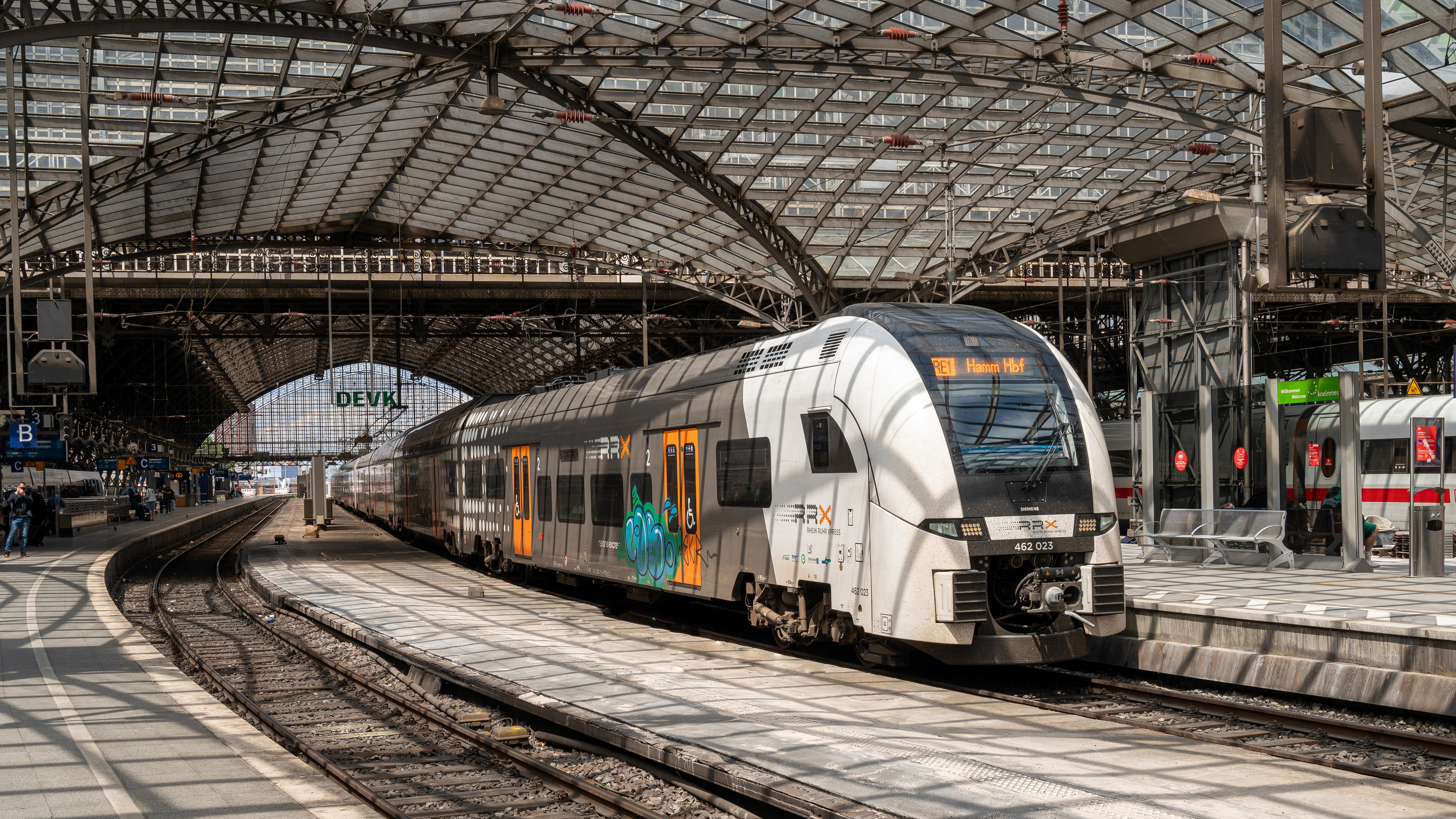
Rhine-Ruhr Express (RE1) train in Cologne Hbf

A reorganisation of services between Cologne and Dortmund is being undertaken in a program known as the Rhine-Ruhr Express (RRX). Within the framework of the so-called RRX interim contract, the services were operated by DB Regio from 2016 until the commissioning of Siemens Desiro HC EMUs for RRX in June 2020. Following this, Abellio Rail NRW was contracted to take over operations at the timetable change on 14 June 2020. However, DB Regio continued to operate the services with the existing rolling stock because Abellio had to suspend staff training due to the COVID-19 pandemic. When the timetable changed on 13 December 2020, the service was taken over by Abellio. However, following the bankruptcy of Abellio, the line has been operated from 1 February 2022 under an emergency contract awarded to National Express.

== Route ==
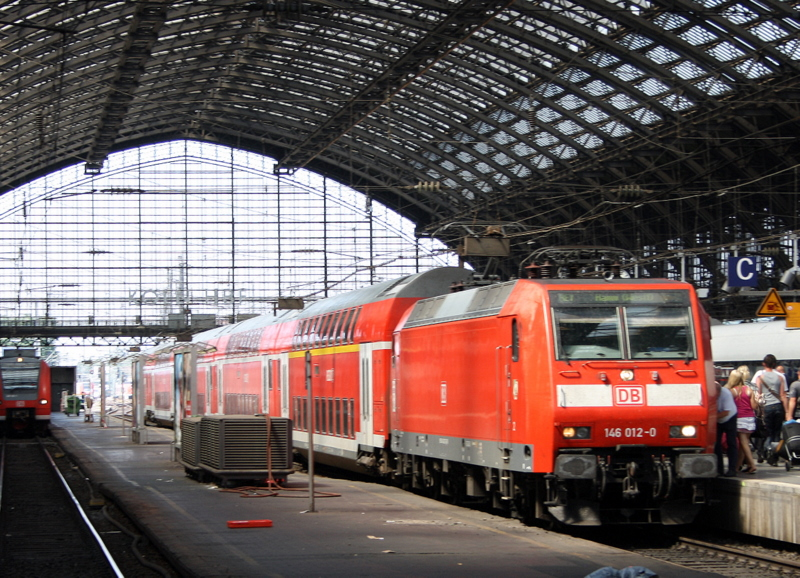
NRW-Express in Cologne Hbf

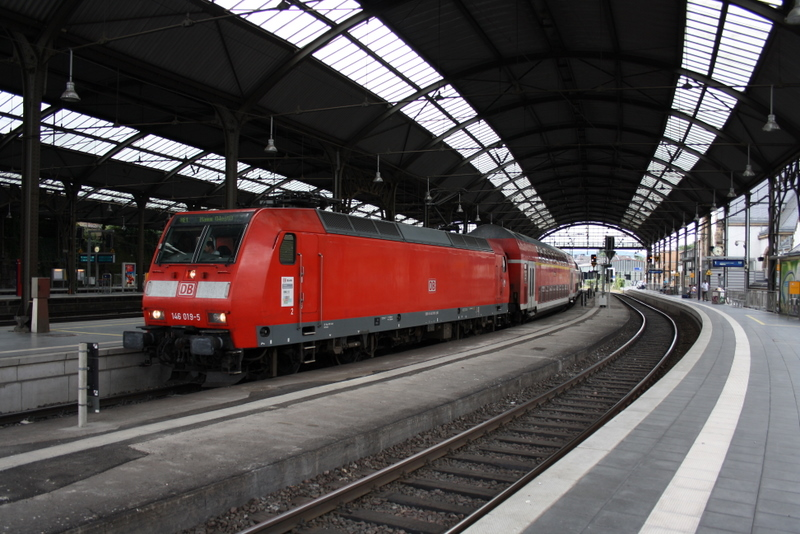
NRW-Express in Aachen Hbf

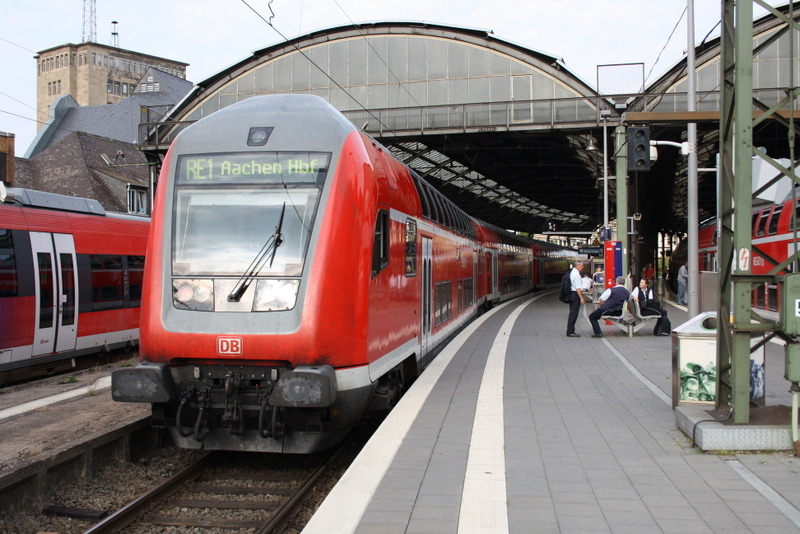
Control car in Aachen Hbf

The NRW-Express operates daily between Aachen and Hamm. It uses a total of four railway lines:

- Dortmund–Hamm line (built by the former Cologne-Minden Railway Company, CME) throughout (together with all regional and long-distance services),
- the Ruhr line between Duisburg and Dortmund (built by the former Bergisch-Märkische Railway Company) throughout (long-distance tracks, together with all regional and long-distance services),
- the Cologne–Duisburg line (built by the CME) through (long-distance tracks, see note below)
- the Aachen–Cologne line (built by the former Rhenish Railway Company) throughout (together with all regional and long-distance services).

In the four to six track section between Duisburg and Düsseldorf, the NRW-Express runs throughout on the long distance tracks, along with the Rhein-Express (RE 5). By contrast, the Rhein-Haard-Express (RE 2), the Rhein-Emscher-Express (RE 3), the Rhein-Weser-Express (RE 6), the Rhein-Hellweg-Express (RE 11) and the Rhein-IJssel-Express (RE 19) run on the S-Bahn tracks or, if available, the so-called local tracks.

Earlier, the NRW-Express used two other railway lines:

- until 2002, the Hamm–Minden railway (built by the CME) between Bielefeld and Hamm (together with all regional and long-distance services),
- from 2002 to 2016, every two hours over the Hamm–Warburg railway (built by the Royal Westphalian Railway Company) between Paderborn and Hamm (together with all regional and long-distance services).

=== Other services ===
The NRW-Express is complemented by other rail passenger services. A large portion of it runs parallel to S-Bahn lines. The following Regional-Express services run every hour along part of its route:

- between Essen and Düsseldorf, the Rhein-Haard-Express RE 2,
- between Hamm and Dortmund and between Duisburg and Düsseldorf, the Rhein-Emscher-Express RE 3,
- between Duisburg and Cologne, the Rhein-Express RE 5,
- between Hamm and Düsseldorf, the Rhein-Weser-Express RE 6,
- between Cologne and Aachen, the Rhein-Sieg-Express RE 9,
- between Hamm and Düsseldorf, the Rhein-Hellweg-Express RE 11,
- between Duisburg and Düsseldorf, the Rhein-IJssel-Express RE 19.

Additional services operate during the peaks between Aachen and Cologne Messe/Deutz five minutes before the regular services in order to overcome overcrowding.

The NRW-Express is linked in Aachen, Cologne, Düsseldorf, Duisburg, Essen, Bochum, Dortmund, Hamm and Paderborn with the whole transport network of North Rhine-Westphalia. It also has direct connections at these stations with long-distance passenger services.

=== Public transport associations ===
Three public transport associations are involved in the operation of the Rhein-Express: the Zweckverband Nahverkehr Rheinland (local transport association of Rhineland, NVR), Verkehrsverbund Rhein-Ruhr (transport association of the Rhine-Ruhr, VRR) and the Zweckverband Nahverkehr Westfalen-Lippe (local transport association of Westphalia-Lippe).

== See also ==
- List of regional rail lines in North Rhine-Westphalia
- List of scheduled railway routes in Germany
- Rhein-Express
- Rhein-Sieg-Express
