= Rhein-Sieg-Express =

RE 9 Rhein-Sieg-Express
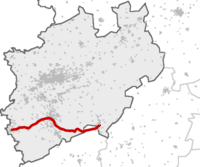

Overview
- Locale: North Rhine-Westphalia

Service
- Route number: 480 (Aachen–Cologne); 460 (Cologne–Siegen)

Technical
- Line length: 171 km (106 mi)
- Operating speed: 140 km/h (87 mph) (maximum)

The Rhein-Sieg-Express is a Regional-Express service in the German state of North Rhine-Westphalia and Rhineland-Palatinate running from Aachen via Düren, Cologne, Troisdorf, Siegburg and Betzdorf to Siegen. It is operated by DB Regio NRW.

== History ==
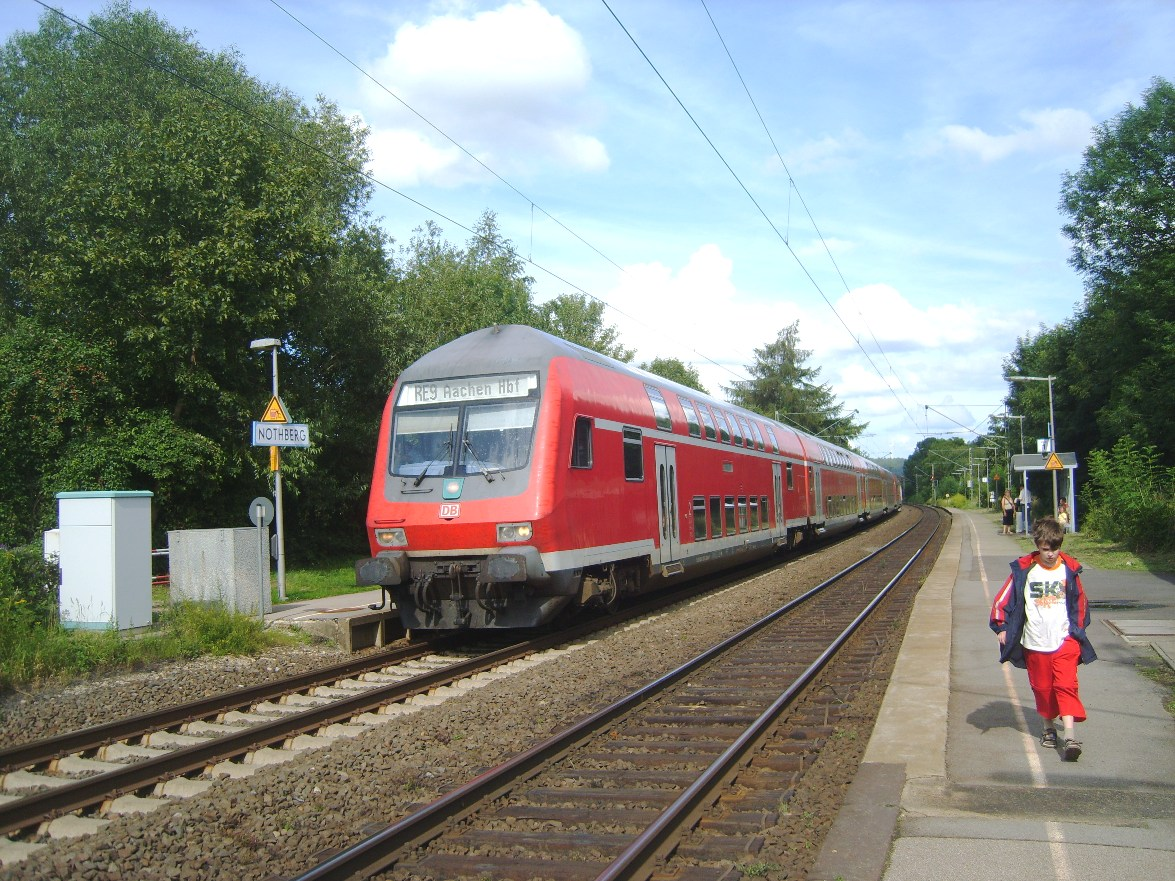
RE 9 service to Aachen in Nothberg

Regional Express (RE) line 9 has existed since the introduction of the integrated timetable (German: integraler Taktfahrplan, ITF) in North Rhine-Westphalia in 1998. Previously one train ran each day over the line to Mönchengladbach from Gießen to Kaldenkirchen.

From 1998 the train service ran on the route from Krefeld via Neuss, Cologne, Siegburg and Siegen to Gießen. The service used old rolling stock, consisting of class 111 locomotives hauling five double-deck carriages. At the introduction of the next stage of the integrated timetable (ITF2) in December 2002, the line was the most vulnerable to delay in North Rhine-Westphalia. The causes of these delays were the single track sections of the Sieg Railway, work in connection with the completion of the Cologne–Frankfurt high-speed line and the upgrading of the Sieg Railway for S-Bahn operations, speed restrictions between Cologne and Krefeld and a very short turnaround time in Krefeld of 12 minutes.

As a result, in December 2003, the sections of line west of the Rhine of the Rhein-Sieg-Express and the Rhein-Münsterland-Express (RE 7) were swapped. The Rhein-Sieg-Express now runs from Cologne to Aachen, making the timetable more stable.

Three public transport associations are involved in the operation of the Rhein-Express: the Zweckverband Nahverkehr Rheinland (local transport association of Rhineland, NVR), SPNV Rheinland-Pfalz Nord (transport association of northern Rhineland-Paltinate) and the Zweckverband Nahverkehr Westfalen-Lippe (local transport association of Westphalia-Lippe). They called for tenders for its continued operations after December 2010 to be submitted by 30 January 2008. In April 2008 it was announced that DB Regio Rheinland (formerly DB Heidekrautbahn, which was established in Potsdam for an unsuccessful bid for services in the Berlin area) would operate the line from 12 December 2010 for 15 years. Therefore, services are to be operated with a total of 15 electric multiple units of the E-Talent 2 variety of the Bombardier Talent called class 442. There will be three three-carriage, ten four-carriage and two five-carriage sets. Since its contract with the North Rhine-Westphalia transport associations was terminated by Rhein-Main-Verkehrsverbund (Rhine-Main transport association) the Rhein-Sieg-Express has terminated since 12 December 2010 in Siegen. Since then the Siegen–Gießen section has been operated only with Hessische Landesbahn trains as services RE 99 and RE 40. However, deliveries of E-Talent 2 to DB Regio Rheinland have been delayed. Since December 2010, the service has been operated under the RSX brand. The new vehicles were first delayed until the second half of 2011, but are now not expected to be available before December 2011. Until then, the line is being operated by conventional double-deck carriages sandwiched between two class 111 locomotives.

DB Regio Rheinland took over DB Regio NRW in August 2011 and became the operator of the service.

== Route ==
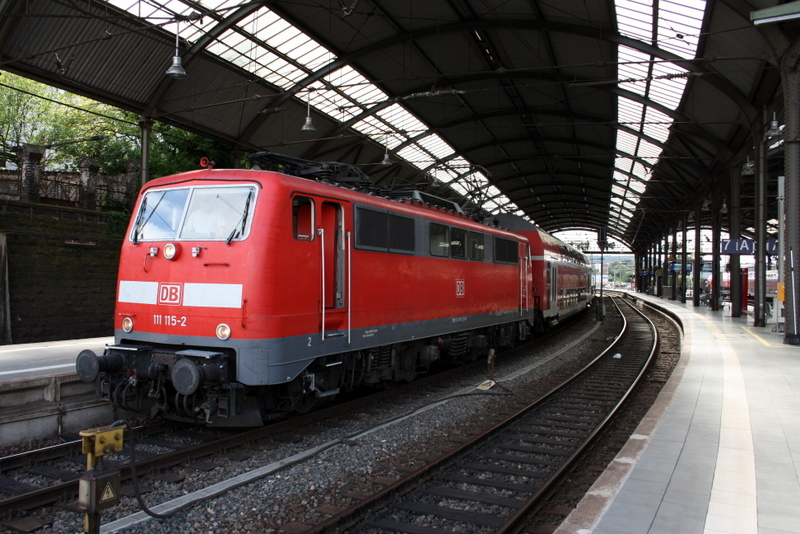
RE 9 in Aachen

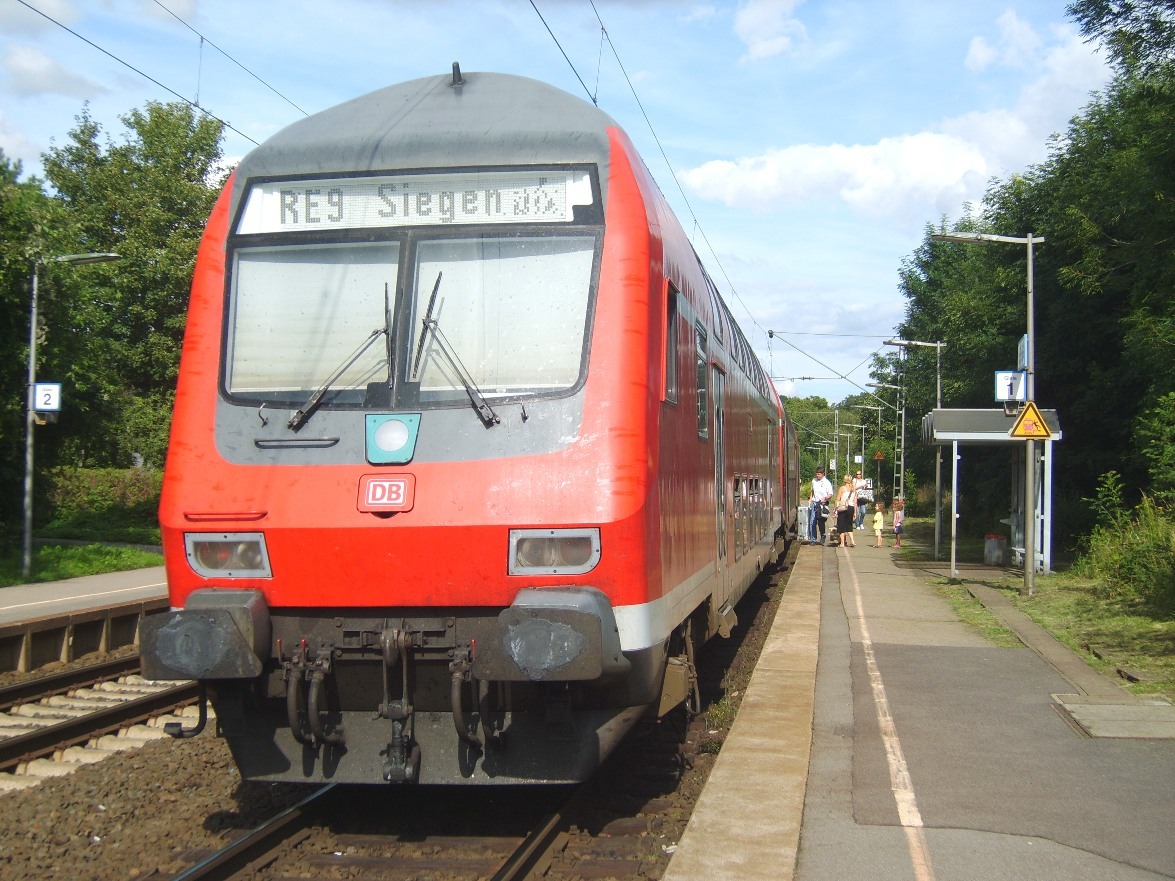
RE 9 to Siegen in Nothberg

The train leaves every hour from Aachen station on the Cologne–Aachen high-speed line to Cologne station. This section is also part of the route of the NRW-Express (RE 1) and together both lines operate services at approximately 30-minute intervals.

From Cologne, the Rhine-Sieg Express follows the Sieg Railway along the Sieg to Siegen. In Siegen there is a regular connection with the Main-Sieg-Express (RE 99) towards Gießen and Frankfurt. In addition connections exist to the Rothaar Railway (RB 93) to Bad Berleburg and to the Dortmund-Siegerland-Express (RE 34) to Dortmund.

The frequency of services of the Rhine-Sieg-Express on the Sieg Railway is increased during the peaks. In the morning two extra trains run to Cologne and in the afternoon two extra trains run from Cologne towards Siegen. These additional trains run between Au (Sieg) and Siegen with stops in Etzbach, Niederhövels, Scheuerfeld and Brachbach. Between Cologne and Au they also stop in Dattenfeld and Rosbach.

== Transport/fare associations ==
The line is running in the area of the fare association Rheinland-Tarif from Cologne to Au (Sieg), in the area of the transport association Verkehrsverbund Rhein-Mosel (VRM) from Etzbach to Niederschelden, from Niederschelden Nord to Siegen in the fare association Westfalen-Tarif and from Haiger to Gießen in the transport association Rhein-Main-Verkehrsverbund (RMV).

== See also ==
- DreiLänderBahn
- Lahn-Eifel-Bahn
- List of regional rail lines in North Rhine-Westphalia
- List of scheduled railway routes in Germany
