= Heinsberg (Rheinland) station =

Railway station in Heinsberg, Germany

Heinsberg (Rheinland)
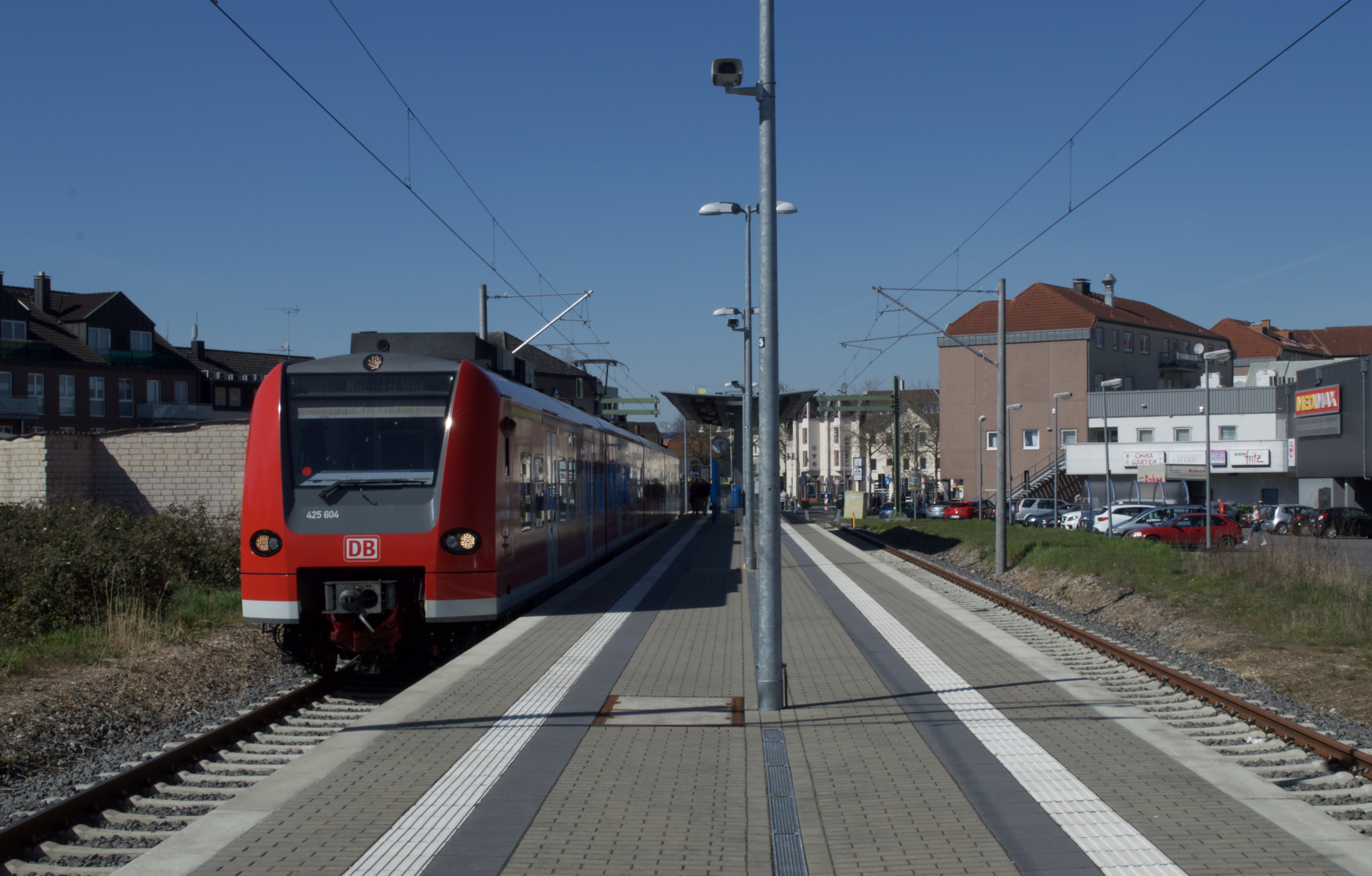

General information
- Location: Heinsberg, NRW; Germany
- Coordinates: 51°03′53″N 6°05′58″E
- Line: Heinsberg–Lindern railway
- Platforms: 2

Other information
- Station code: n/a
- DS100 code: KHEB
- IBNR: 8002721
- Fare zone: AVV: 50; VRS: 3400 (AVV transitional tariff)

History
- Opened: 1890

Services
| Preceding station | DB Regio NRW | Following station |
|---|---|---|
| Heinsberg Kreishaus towards Aachen Hbf | RB 33 | Terminus |
Location

Heinsberg (Rheinland) station is a train station in Heinsberg, in the German state of North Rhine-Westphalia. It's situated at the end of the Lindern–Heinsberg railway. The entrance building and the freight sheds were successively demolished in 1997 after the closure of the passenger service in 1980, the end of freight traffic to Heinsberg in 1994 and the closure of the line between Oberbruch and Heinsberg in 1997. In preparation for the reactivation of passenger services on 15 December 2013, a new island platform was erected to the east of the site of the demolished entrance building.

== Location ==
The station is located on the northeast edge of the town centre. The Heinsberg Galerie, a shopping centre, is next to the station. The station is bordered to the east by the Heinsberg commercial area, where there used to be a siding to a timber yard.

== History ==
=== 1890–1980 ===
Heinsberg gained its first railway connection in 1890 with the construction of the Heinsberger Bahn (Heinsberg Railway), also called Wurmtalbahn (Wurm Valley Railway). After long consideration of the possibilities for extending the railway, the station was built as a terminus. The entrance building was then located on the area that is between the current bus station and medical centre. It was almost identical with that of the neighbouring Dremmen station, but the signal box was in the entrance building and not in a glass annex, as in Dremmen. There were two waiting rooms in Heinsberg. A freight-handling facility was established directly next to the reception building with its own loading track.

The station was destroyed in the Second World War. The remains of the entrance building were demolished and were never rebuilt, instead a wood shed was built as a temporary station. The rail tracks were rebuilt by volunteers.

A new entrance building was opened in 1951 with a separate freight area to its south. On the tracks and the platform there was a glass annex, similar to at the Dremmen station. This contained a signal box and the ticket office. All part of the platform were covered. There was also a canopy over the entrance from the street. Passenger traffic was handled on only one track and the remaining tracks were used for freight and sidings to the timber yard and the gas works. The passenger traffic was abandoned in 1980. A few years later, the entrance building was demolished to make way for a new bus station. The track layout was partly demolished to make room for the Heinsberg-Galerie.

=== Since 2010 ===
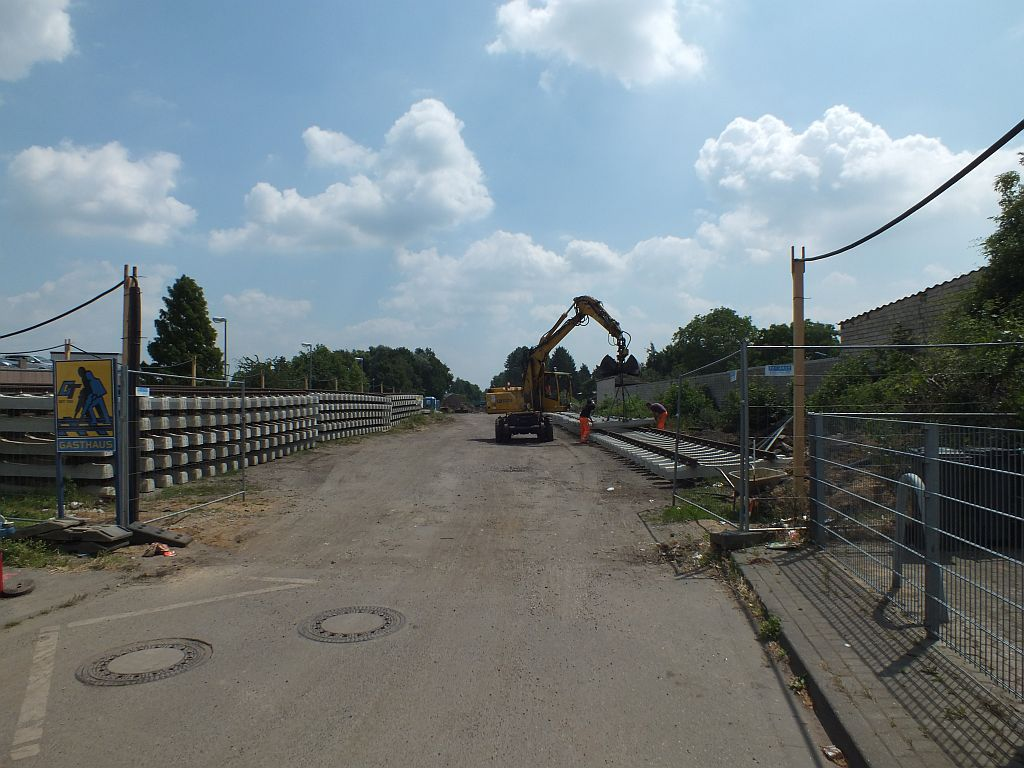
Work on reactivation in June 2012

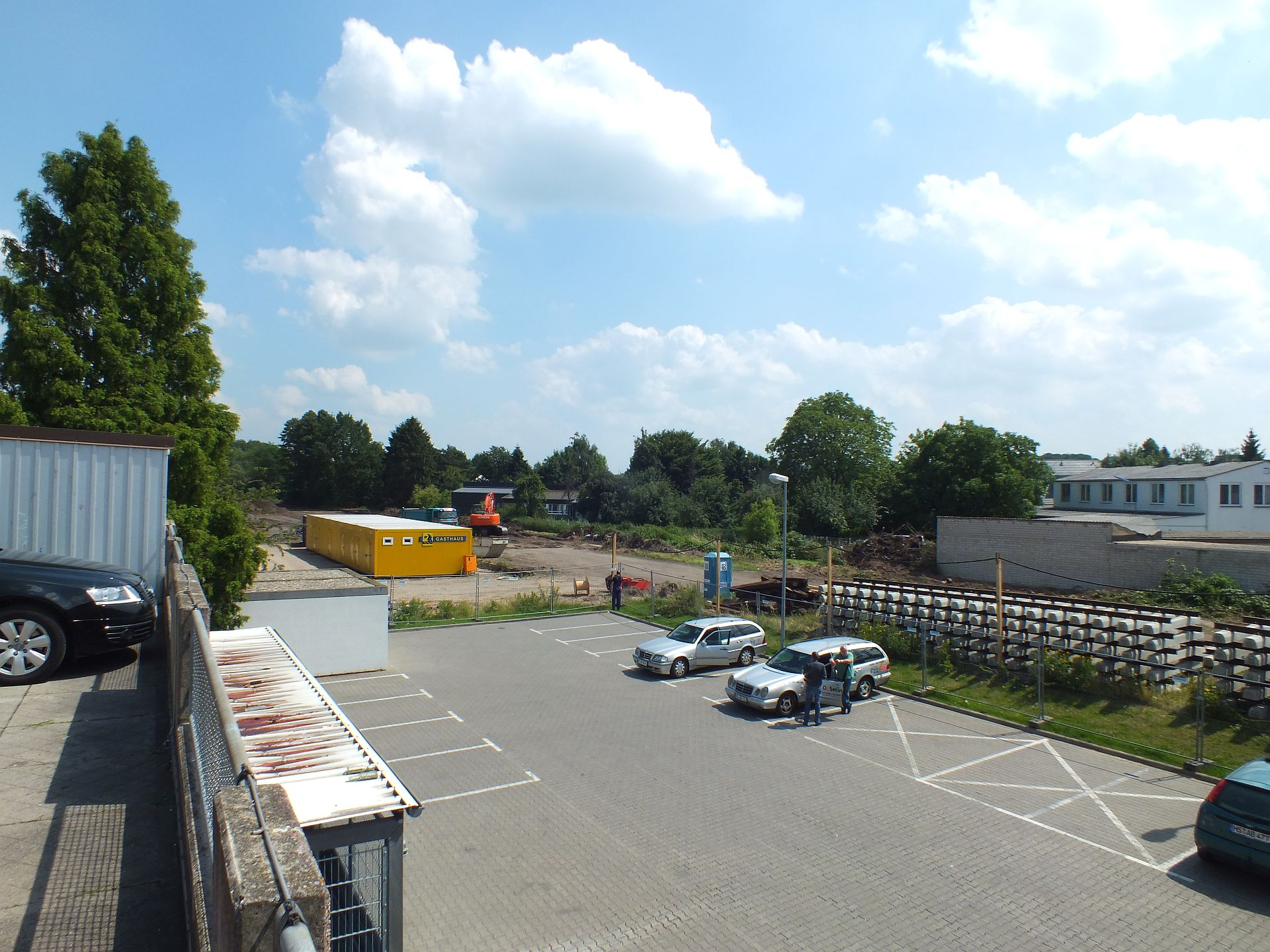
View of the construction site in 2012 ...

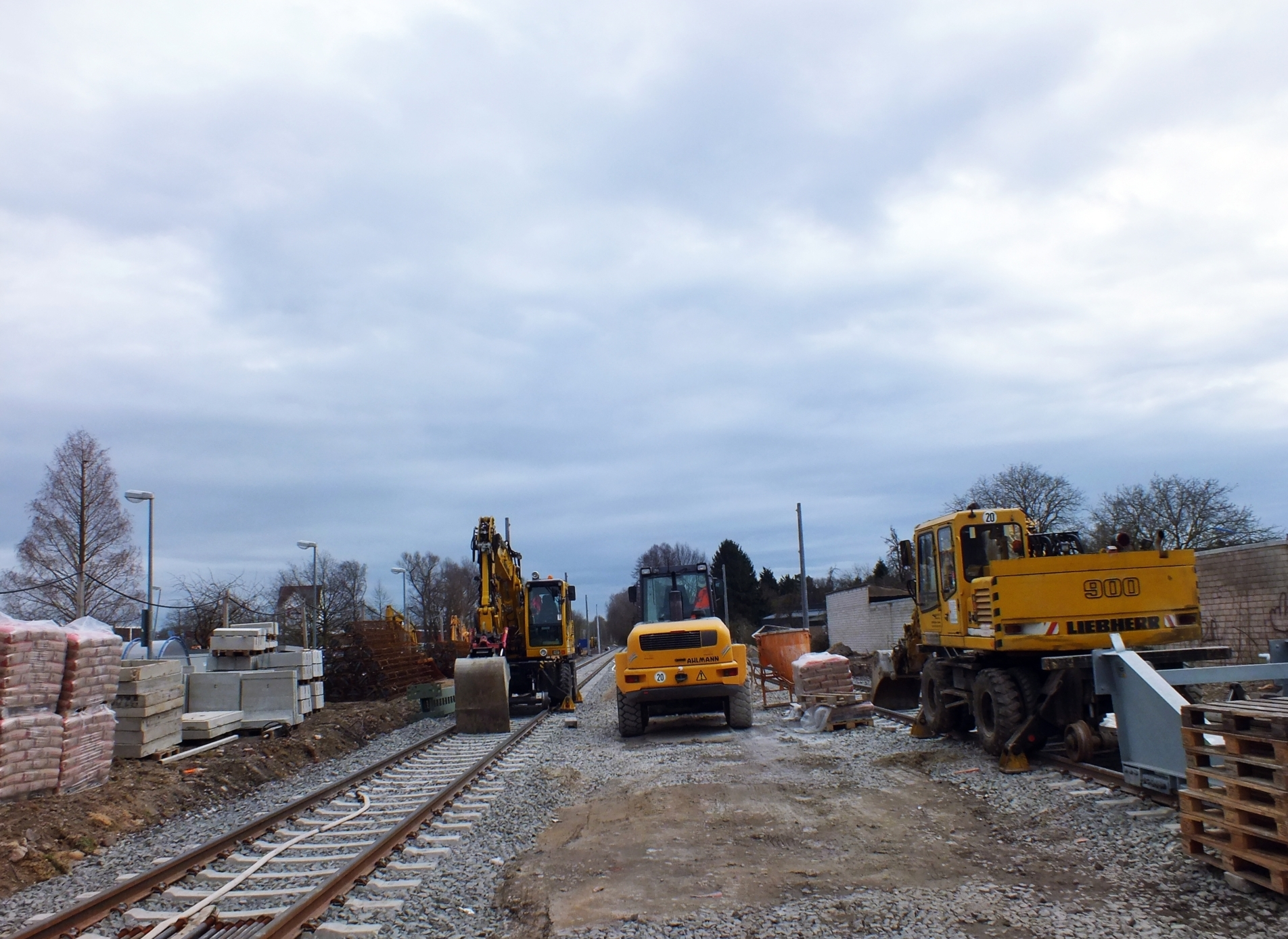
... and in spring 2013

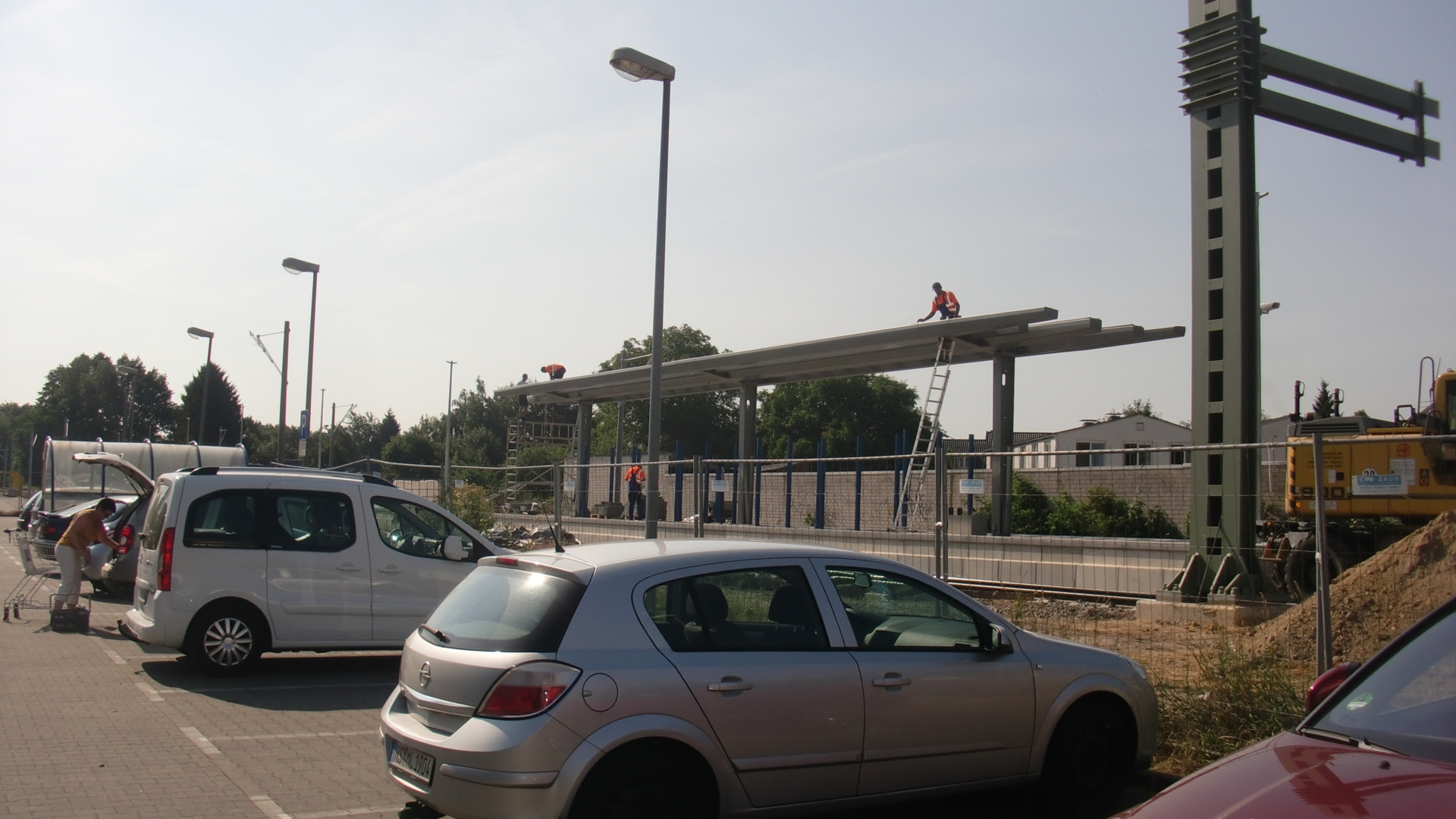
July 2013: fitting out of the platform

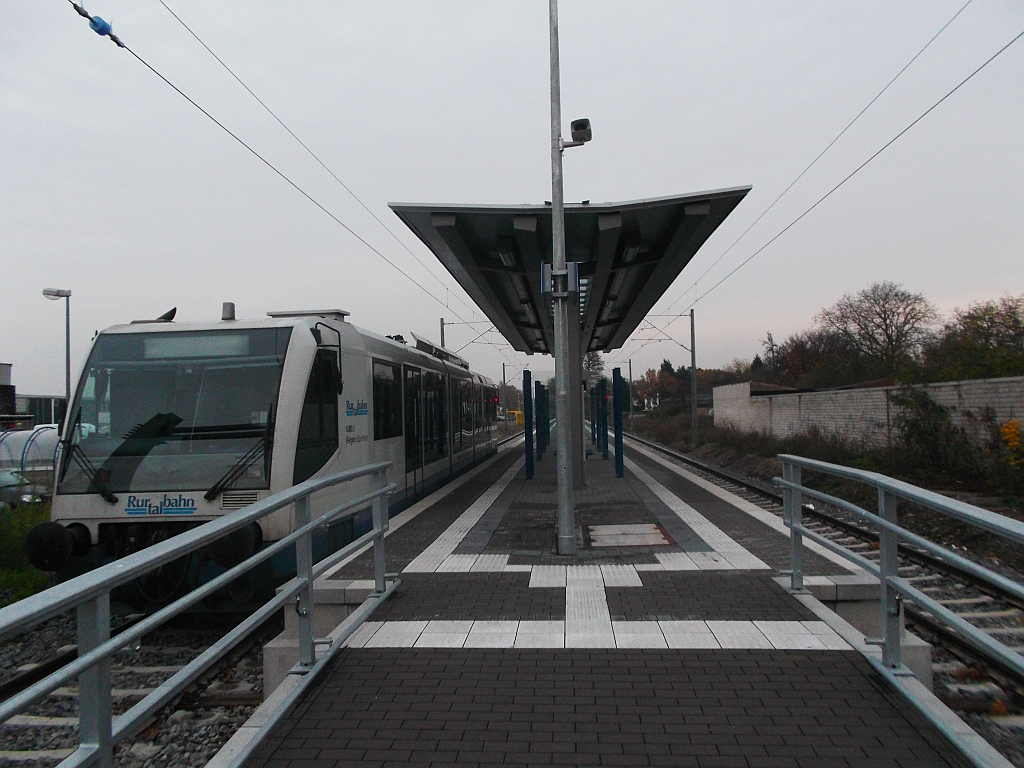
New platform after completion

Heinsberg was originally intended to be reopened for rail traffic in 2008, but due to reductions in subsidies, the reactivation of the railway line was delayed, so that the reactivation was then due in 2012. In October 2011, the first edition of the West-Express, a publication of the infrastructure manager Rurtalbahn, announced that a Park and Ride facility would be built in Heinsberg. The journey time from Lindern to Heinsberg, including stops, would be 17 minutes.

The Heinsberg–Oberbruch section was cleared in the spring of 2010. The Zug der Erinnerung ("train of memory", a memorial to children deported by train as part of the Holocaust) was able to run over the line to the Heinsberg Kreishaus (district house) in the same spring. With the clearance of the tracks of this section, their bad condition became clear. Above all, it was impossible to run over the points in the Heinsberg station area.

In June 2012, the old railway tracks were removed at Heinsberg station, the remains of the loading ramp and the remaining foundations of the freight-handling facility were demolished and a new level area was created. The new railway tracks, platform and car park were built on the levelled area.

The car park, the platform and the platform canopy were largely finished in July 2013. To ensure that the traffic to the station does not have to pass through the town centre, the parking lot is only accessible by car via an access road from Industriestrasse.

Since 15 December 2013, the Rhein-Niers-Bahn has run from Heinsberg towards Aachen Hauptbahnhof hourly. The trains are coupled or split in portions at Lindern station.

| Line | Route | Frequency |
|---|---|---|
| RB 33 | Heinsberg (Rheinl) – Heinsberg Kreishaus – Heinsberg-Oberbruch – Heinsberg-Dremmen – Heinsberg-Porselen – Heinsberg-Horst – Heinsberg-Randerath – Lindern – Geilenkirchen – Übach-Palenberg – Herzogenrath – Kohlscheid – Aachen West – Aachen Schanz – Aachen Hbf; Status: December 2016 timetable | 60 min |

== Bus connections ==
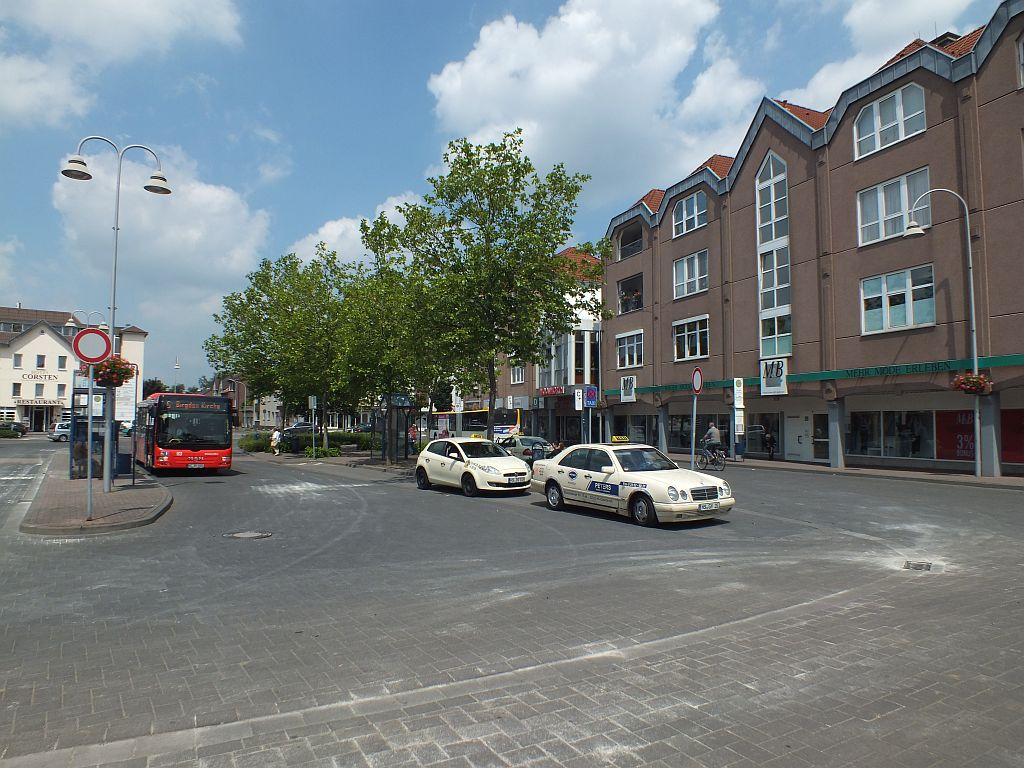
The Heinsberg bus station

Numerous buses run from Heinsberg station in different directions. Line 493 runs to Lindern as a substitute for the rail service on weekdays. The buses are operated by West Energie und Verkehr and the RVE. At the bus station there are three buses platforms and two taxi ranks.

== Freight yard ==
In addition to the freight facilities of the station, the timber yard and gas works still had their own connections. The siding to the gas plant has been closed and dismantled and the siding to the timber yard has also been closed but it has not yet been dismantled (as of 2011). Since the freight traffic was stopped only five years after the passenger traffic, only the entrance building was rebuilt, not the freight facilities. This was demolished in 2003. Today's station has signs of the loading ramp for goods and sugar beet. The foundations of the freight facilities was still clear until August 2012. With the resumption of passenger traffic all the tracks between Oberbruch and Heinsberg were relocated. The former sidings and other tracks to the old freight yard were removed.
