= Heinsberg–Lindern railway =

Rail line in Germany

Coordinates: 51.0470°N 6.1487°E

Lindern–Heinsberg (Rheinl) railway
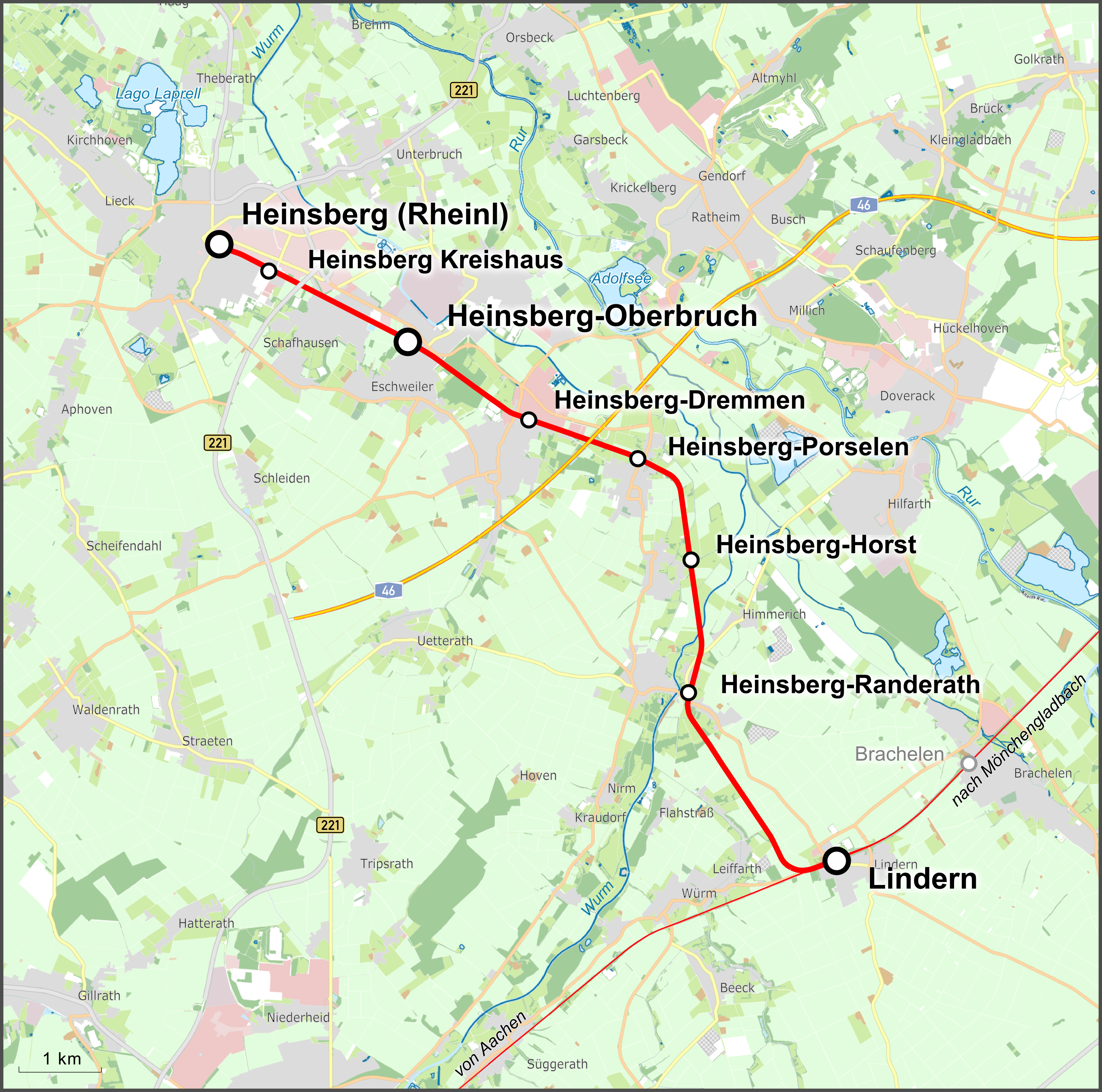

Overview
- Line number: 2542
- Locale: North Rhine-Westphalia, Germany
- Termini: Lindern; Heinsberg (Rheinland)

Service
- Route number: 485 (formerly 245, 456)

Technical
- Line length: 12.2 km (7.6 mi)
- Track gauge: 1,435 mm (4 ft 8 1/2 in) standard gauge
- Electrification: 15 kV/16.7 Hz AC overhead catenary

The Lindern–Heinsberg (Rheinl) railway, also called the Heinsberger Bahn (Heinsberg Railway) or Wurmtalbahn (Wurm Valley Railway) is a single-track branch line from Lindern on the Aachen–Mönchengladbach railway to Heinsberg in the German state of North Rhine-Westphalia. It was opened in 1890.

== History and operations ==
Originally, a railway line from Jülich via Brachelen and Randerath to Heinsberg was proposed, but later it was decided to build a shortened route, which would start in Lindern. Initial plans foresaw the construction of the line as a narrow-gauge railway or a line for horsecars. Such projects were, however, rejected in favour of a standard railway. There was resistance to railway construction in Porselen; some small holders refused to surrender parts of their land and attacked railwaymen with marbles.

The line was opened on 16 May 1890. This date was to be historically significant for the town of Heinsberg and the surrounding communities. The economy in the otherwise structurally weak Heinsberg country profited immensely; especially the Vereinigte Glanzstoff-Fabriken in the district of Oberbruch would develop into a large company because of the building of the railway. The company built a works railway, which operated up to the 1980s and passed through the village of Oberbruch.

Closure of the gap between Lindern and Jülich could no longer be achieved, as the development of coal mines around Hückelhovenhad led to the construction of the Jülich–Dalheim railway to the right of Rur. Plans to extend the Heinsberg Railway to Sittard, as a tramway to Roermond or in the standard-gauge railway to Wassenberg, failed because of their cost.

=== Second World War and post-war period ===
In 1944, Heinsberg station was destroyed, so Deutsche Bundesbahn decided in the early 1950s to build a new station. This resulted in a station building that was rather too large for Heinsberg.

The 1950s brought the next major changes. On 11 September 1953, Deutsche Bundesbahn announced one of its first rationalisation measures: passenger services, which had previously been steam-hauled were transferred to modern, more economical diesel railcars. From then on, all passenger services were operated with railbuses of classes VT 95 and VT 98 and freight trains were hauled by small and medium diesel locomotives (such as Köf and V 100). In freight transport, however, large diesel locomotives of class V 160 were also used, which were clearly restricted in their tasks (freight trains with a maximum of ten wagons). Accumulator cars were operated in the last years of rail operations.

=== Decline ===
As early as 1966, rumours went around about a possible closure of the Heinsberg Railway. Deutsche Bundesbahn (DB) wanted to remove itself from loss-making operations on small secondary lines. Thus, the closure of the Heinsberg railway was discussed by DB.

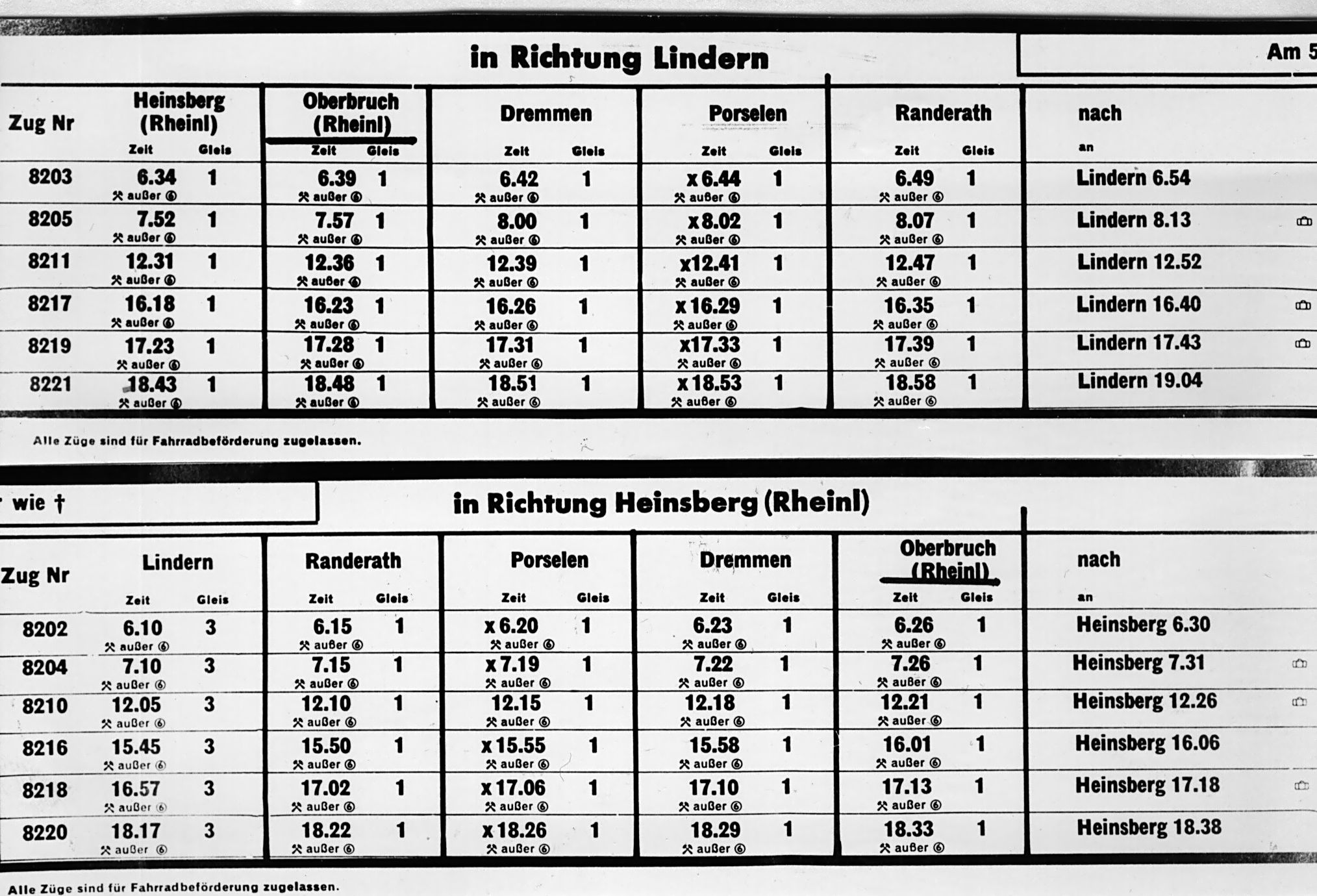
1980 timetable with only six pairs of trains a day

With the spread of motoring, passenger volume declined further in the 1970s. Public passenger traffic shifted away from the railway stations on the outskirts to buses operated by Deutsche Bundesbahn through the local centres and, at the same time, DB reduced services on the Heinsberg railway to only very few train pairs per day.

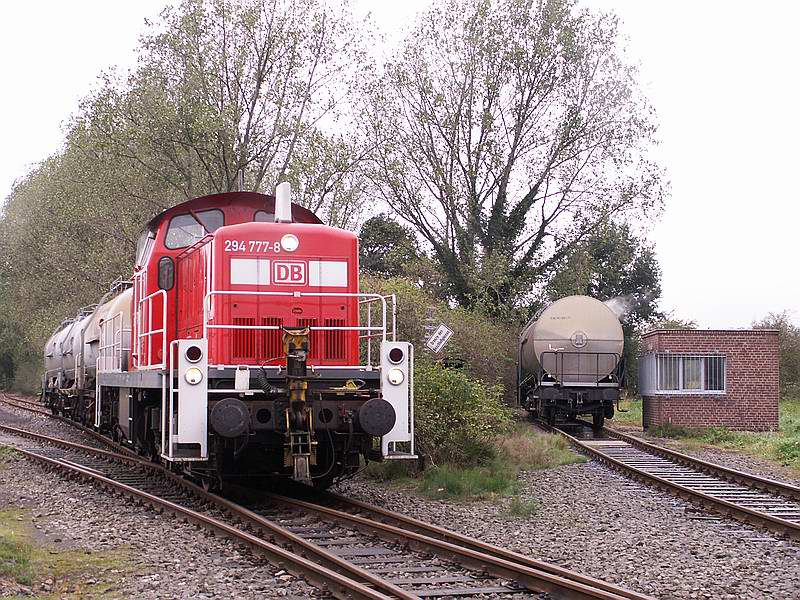
Class V 90 in the Heinsberg-Oberbruch freight transfer yard

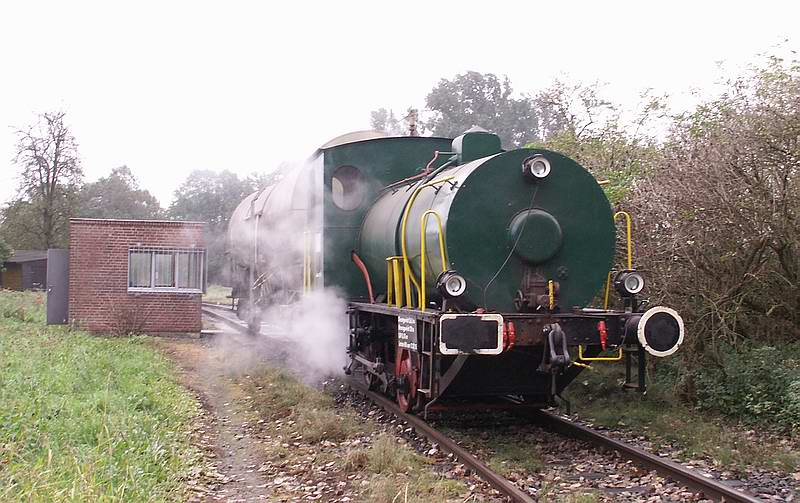
Fireless locomotive in 2006

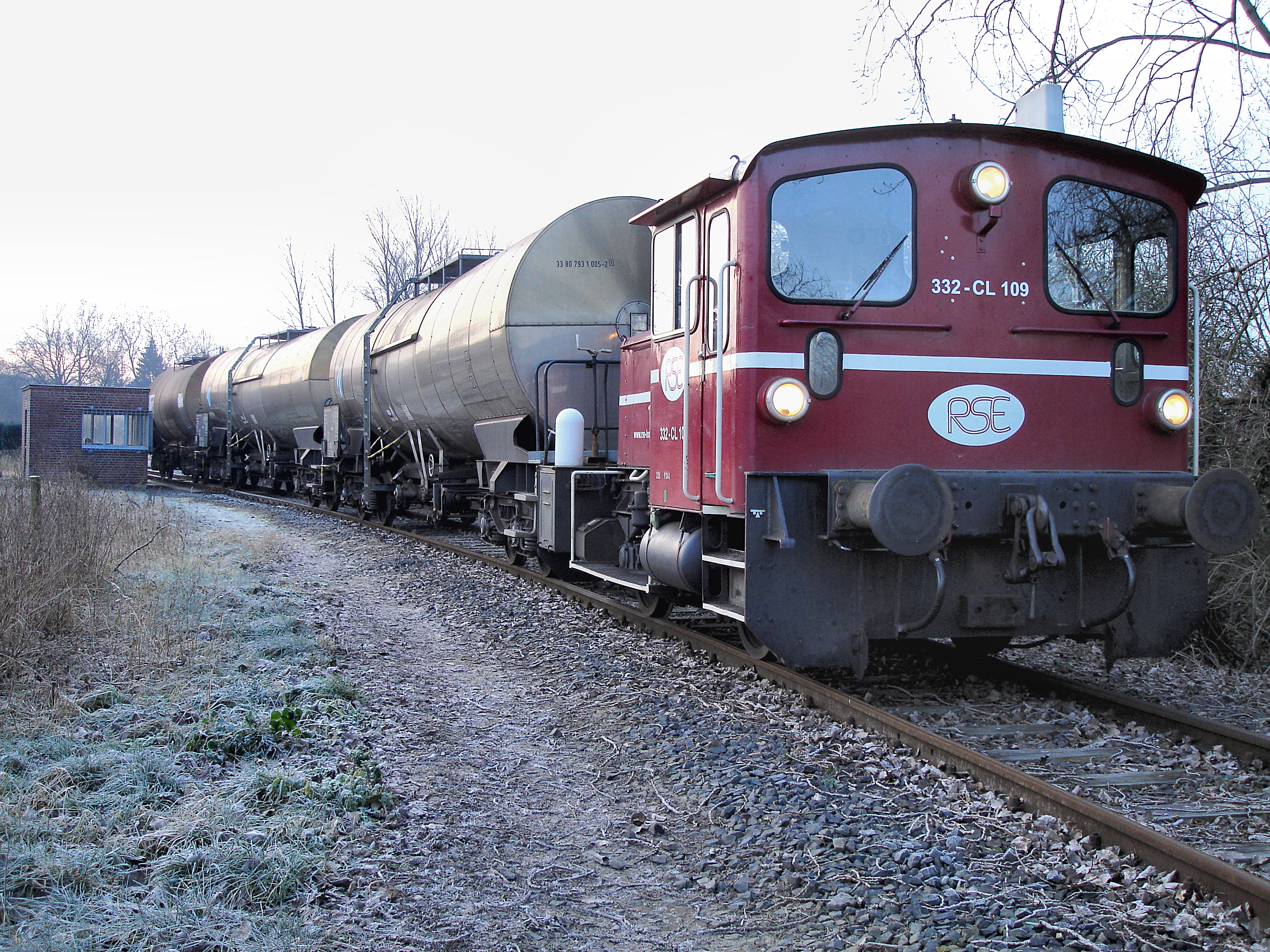
RSE locomotive in Heinsberg-Oberbruch in 2007

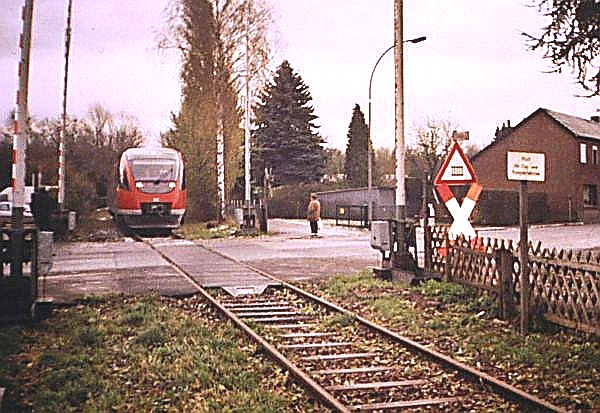
Special train in Heinsberg-Oberbruch in 2005

In 1972, a ZDF broadcast called Länderspiegel compared the rather rural terminal station in Heinsberg with the main line Erkelenz station, in order to characterise the future district town of Heinsberg as a "peasant village" and to present the town of Erkelenz as a more suitable place for the administration of then newly formed Heinsberg district.

Critics (local politicians and newspapers) saw the reduced supply as a cause of the drop in passenger numbers and claimed that the railway had systematically tried to make services on the route unattractive in order to use the resulting loss of passengers to build a case to close it. A further basis for this protest were the required passenger censuses of the local DB administration, which followed the usual DB practice in the 1970s and 1980s of being carried out during holidays, on days between weekends and public holidays (Brückentagen) or on weekends. A local CDU member of the Bundestag, Adolf Freiherr Spies von Büllesheim was doubtful about these surveys. He described the DB numbers as "unrealistic phantom numbers" which were "not verifiable".

Despite this protest, the last scheduled passenger train ran on the line on 26 September 1980.

While most of the stations on the line were demolished or used for other purposes, the Heinsberg station remained in operation (for the time being) as a service point for the freight traffic of the municipal gas works in Heinsberg. In the mid-1980s, however, the entrance building was demolished for the construction of the City Center.

The shift of traffic from rail to road also took place in freight transport: with the transfer of small freight loads to the road through the new freight forwarding company, Bahntrans (a joint venture of DB and Thyssen Haniel Logistik), the transport of freight by rail was significantly reduced, making it unprofitable.

However, the seasonally fluctuating rail transport of agricultural produce such as sugar beet or fertiliser also decreased because of the motorisation of the farmers and the agricultural trade increased significantly in the 1970s. With new, more powerful tractors, for example, sugar beet could be delivered directly to the sugar mill (for the Heinsberg farmers, for example, the sugar mills in Jülich or Ameln). Only a few customers, such as the municipal gas works, a timber yard and the Glanzstoff factory, remained in Oberbruch.

The line was served several times a week in freight transport with locomotives of class V90 in 2010. The only freight transport customer to have remained was the Chemiepark ("chemical park") in Oberbruch. Freight transport at the Heinsberg and Dremmen stations was already planned to be closed on 28 May 1994 due to poor profitability. The Oberbruch – Heinsberg section was closed with effect from 24 December 1997.

For the operation of the Chemiepark Oberbuch, the locomotive by the Chemiepark hauled freight wagons to Oberbruch station, where they were taken over by a DB locomotive operated by DB Schenker Rail (now DB Cargo).

In the spring of 2007, the privately owned Rhein-Sieg-Eisenbahn (RSE) formed a joint venture to operate the Nuon plant of the Chemiepark Oberbuch, which required a train driver of the RSE and a shunter from Nuon to work together in shifts at the Oberbruch site. A diesel locomotive of the RSE was used, rather than a fireless locomotive. The reason for this was that the fireless locomotive of the "Meiningen" class, which had previously been used for shunting, had been taken out of service at a major examination. Under this new collaboration, the Chemiepark Oberbuch hoped for "greater flexibility, contacts with new customers and greater use of rail operations."

As a permanent replacement of the rail services, the buses on route 493 of the Regionalverkehr Euregio Maas-Rhein (Regional transport of the Meuse–Rhine Euroregion) ran on different routes between the town of Heinsberg and Lindern station. The districts served were Schafhausen, Eschweiler, Oberbruch, Hülhoven, Dremmen, Porselen, Horst and Randerath.

=== Sale, refurbishment of the infrastructure and the restoration of rail services ===
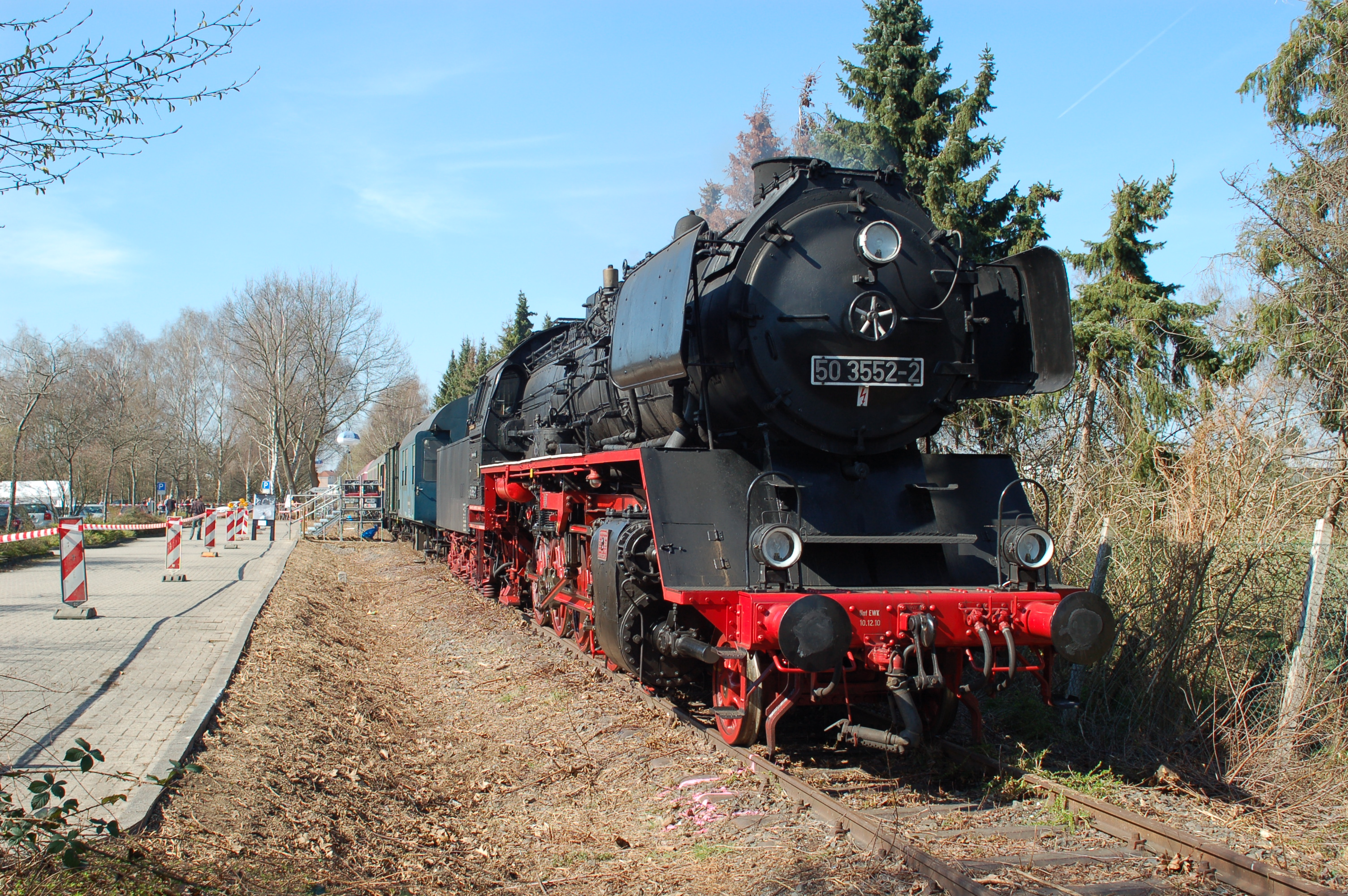
The work on the Heinsberg-Oberbruch–Heinsberg (Rheinl) section made Heinsberg accessible by rail again in the spring of 2011: Zug der Erinnerung ("train of memory") on 23 March 2011 in Heinsberg.

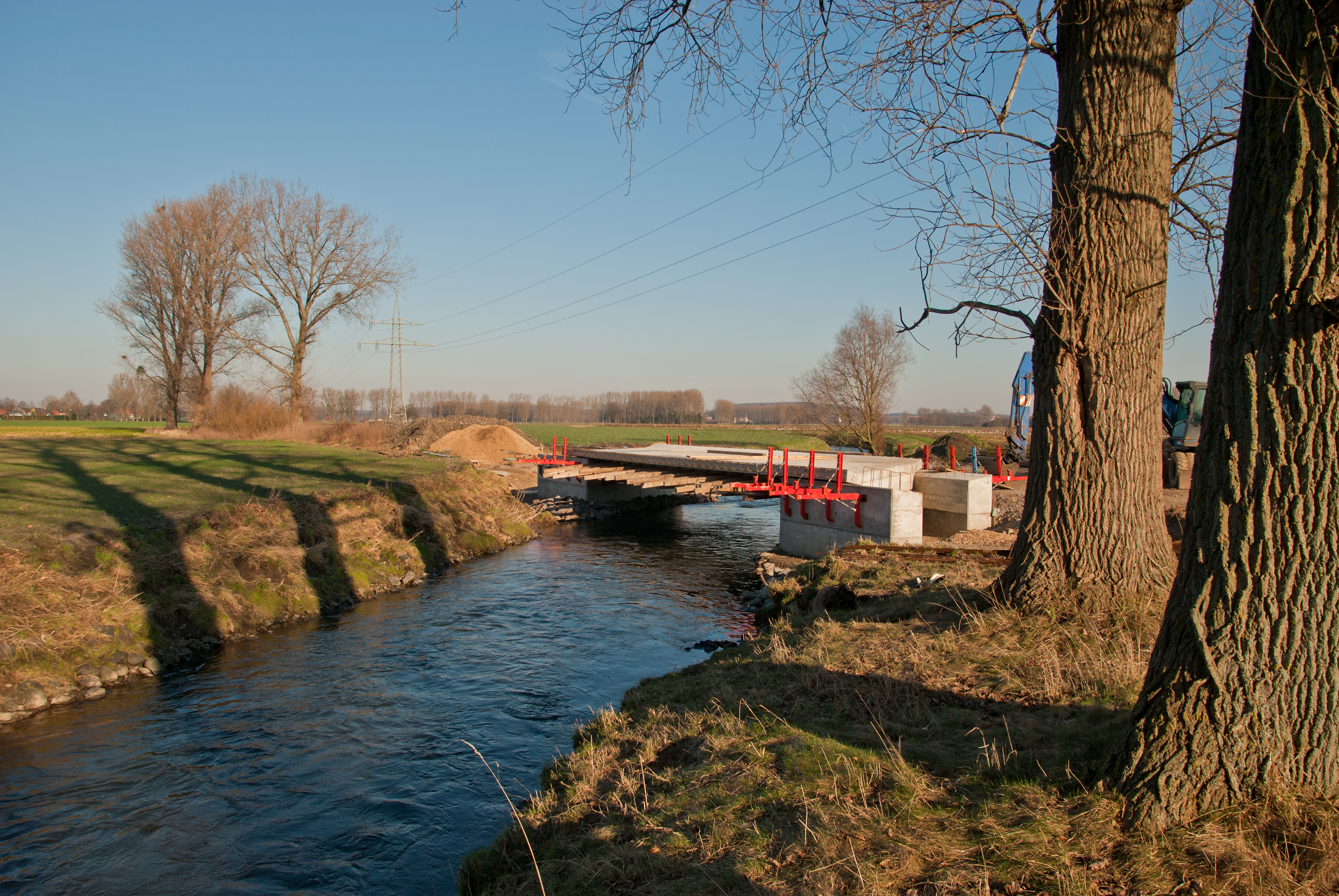
The bridge over the Wurm, which has been rebuilt, on 13 January 2013

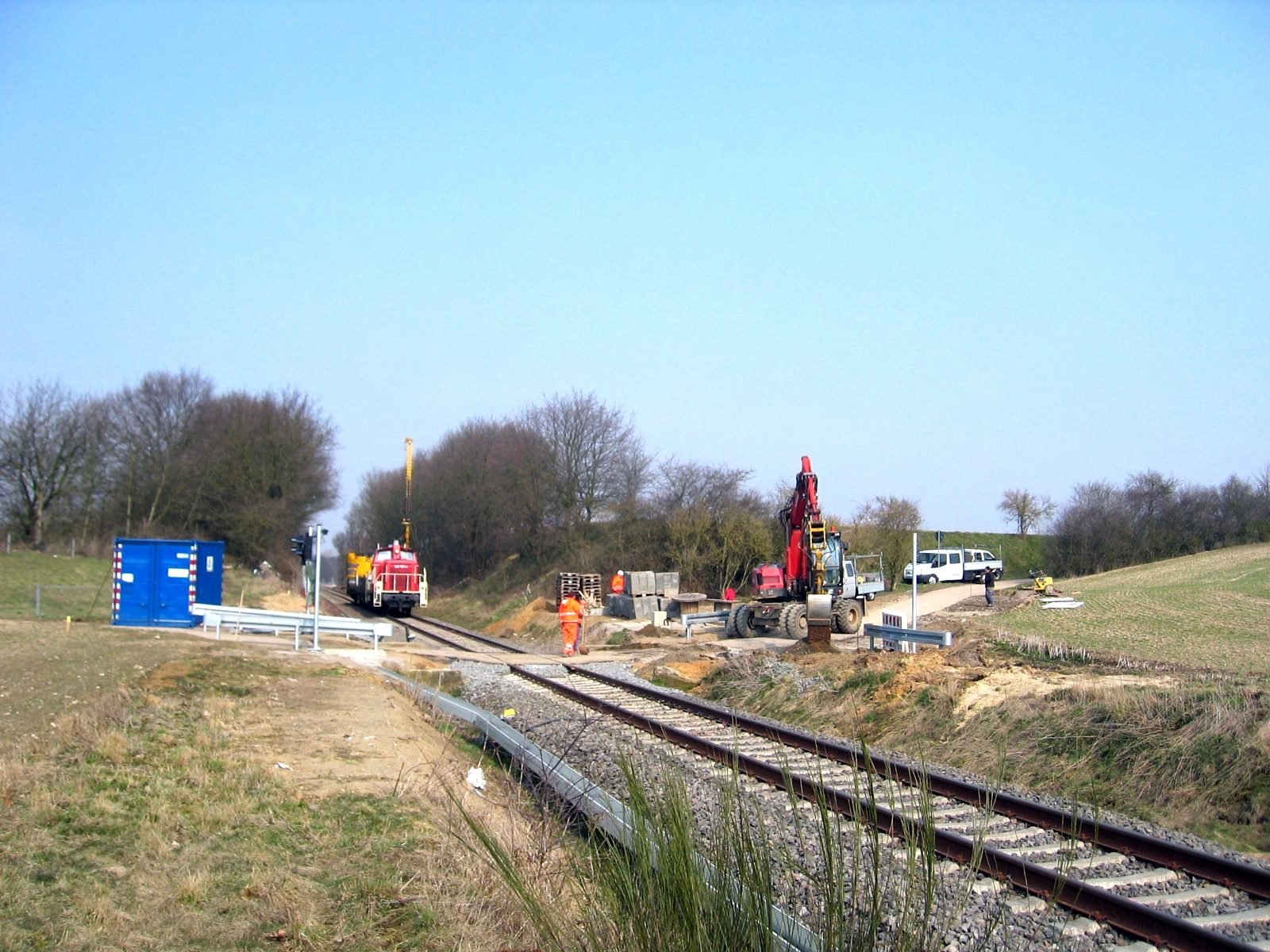
Reactivation of the Lindern–Heinsberg line, Honsdorf level crossing in March 2013

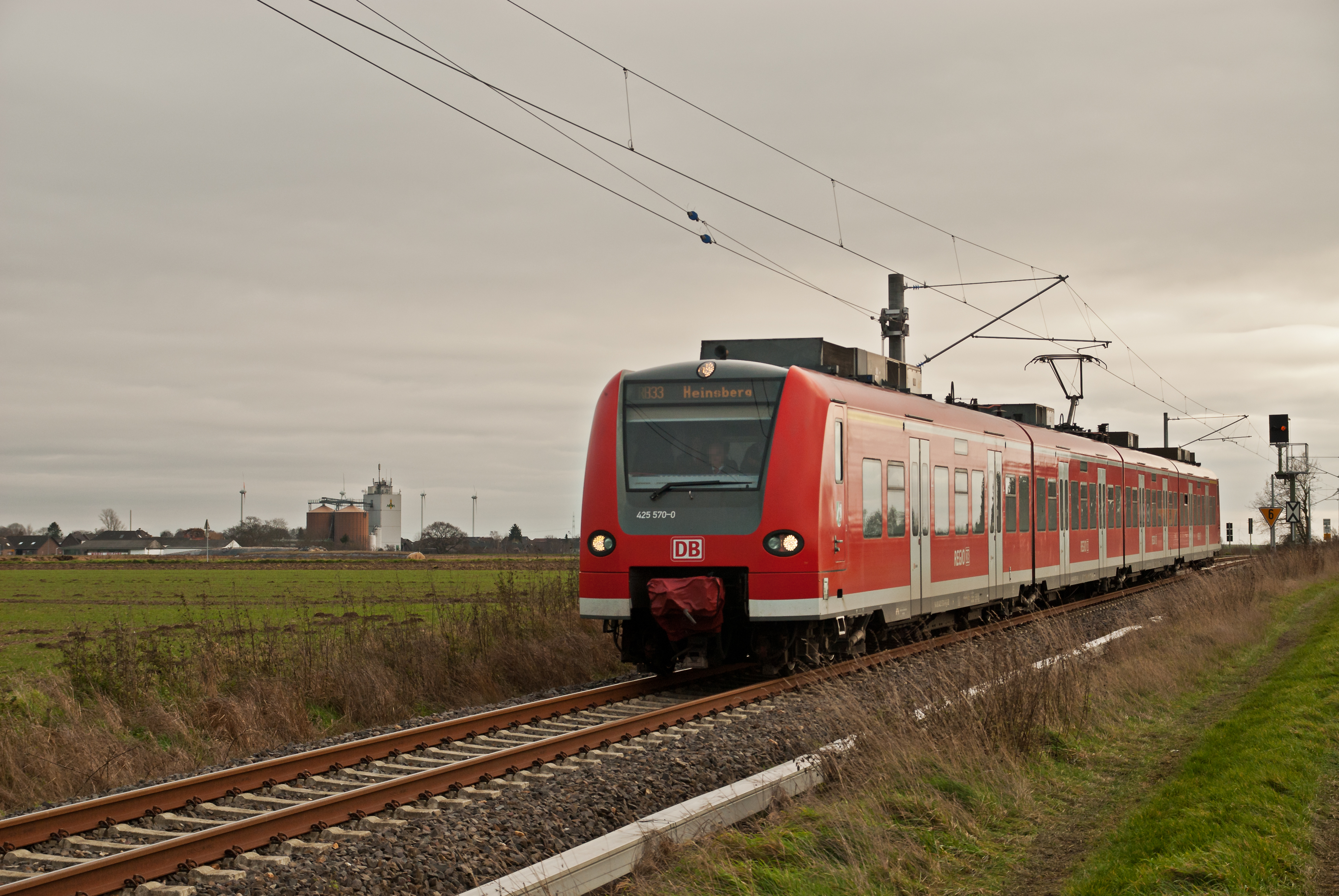
RB 33 on the way to Heinsberg between Lindern and Heinsberg-Randerath. Taken on the day of resumption of passenger services on 15 December 2013.

Large parts of the line were renovated in 2005, level crossings were modernised and a new track body was laid with concrete sleepers.

The first new reconstruction took place with a view to the upcoming reactivation in February 2010. Hans Joachim Sistenich, then managing director of Aachener Verkehrsverbund (Aachen public transport) and the Zweckverband Nahverkehr Rheinland (Rhineland local transport), explained on 9 March 2010 in the Heinsberg District Office that he had the goal to restore rail services towards Heinsberg from December 2012, initially on part of the line. The financing and all contractual questions were clarified. WestEnergie und Verkehr GmbH (the district-owned utility company) was named as the owner of the rail infrastructure and Rurtalbahn GmbH as the operator of the infrastructure. In addition, the line would be electrified. With effect from 31 December 2010, the ownership of the line passed from DB Netz to WestEnergie und Verkehr, which purchased the line in order to lease it to Rurtalbahn. In the list of railway infrastructure companies of the Federal Railway Authority (Eisenbahn-Bundesamt), the railway infrastructure company responsible for the line is listed as Rurtalbahn GmbH.

Since the end of passenger services in 1980, the only freight transport, traffic to Chemiepark Oberbuch, ended at the timetable change in December 2013 and the superstructure between Oberbruch and Heinsberg and the stations were then rebuilt. In addition, the line was electrified with overhead line. The reactivation of the line with operations by Euregiobahn was originally planned to be implemented in 2008, but was then put delayed by a reduction of federal funding.

Until the middle of December 2013, Heinsberg was the only district in the North Rhine-Westphalia (and one of the few districts in the whole of Germany) that could not be reached by rail passenger services.

Reactivation was demanded by the passenger associations Pro Bahn and Verkehrsclub Deutschland. In addition, the Industrie- und Handelskammern Aachen ("Chamber of Industry and Commerce of Aachen") assessed the reactivation of the line as a "measure of high urgency for passenger traffic, freight transport and local transport" in 2009. Despite the initially negative attitude of the North Rhine-Westphalian Ministry of Transport, the Aachener Verkehrsverbund (Aachen transport association, AVV) and the local politicians supported the reactivation plans. Once the realisation date 2008 could not be met due to the reduction of federal funding, a reactivation of the line by June 2013 was targeted. Due to delays in the completion of the electronic interlocking, the resumption of the passenger traffic took place only at the timetable change on 15 December 2013. Two days before, on 13 December 2013, the line had been officially put back into operation in a public celebration. The costs of the rehabilitation and adaptation of the infrastructure amounted to around €18 million.

=== Public transport operations ===
When the Rhein-Niers-Bahn from Aachen reached Lindern, one portion continues to run via Mönchengladbach to Essen, while the other reverses and runs from Lindern to Heinsberg. The infrastructure of the Heinsberg Railway is operated by Rurtalbahn. The line operation is operated by DB Regio NRW using Class 425 sets. Coming from Heinsberg, this portion is reconnected in Lindern to the portion from Mönchengladbach and then the train continues to Aachen.

At the beginning of 2015, only 1,400 passengers used the service daily instead of the forecast 2,000. There were still regular problems with the operation of the portion working, with poor provision of information to passengers. In addition, many bus connections in the district of Heinsberg were still unchanged from their original timetable and had not been adapted to the railway timetable. There is also a poor connection from the Rhein-Niers-Bahn from Heinsberg towards Mönchengladbach, as it misses the Wupper-Express (RE 4) towards Düsseldorf by a few minutes.

== Route description ==
The route now begins on platform 3 of Lindern station, which was built in 1852 and dates back to the founding of the Aachen–Mönchengladbach railway. It runs first parallel to the main line towards Aachen, then shortly after the Thomashof railway crossing it runs to the north-west up a hill, which is part of the Aldenhoven loess plate and thus part of the Jülich Börde landscape, and then continues towards Randerath. From Randerath it descends immediately and crosses the Wurm between Randerath and Horst. Between Horst and Porselen, the line leaves the Wurm valley and then continues through the Heinsberg Rur meadow lands to Heinsberg. Nevertheless, the line from the Wurm bridge after Randerath always remains on the left (western) side of the Wurm, which also flows through the Rur meadow lands to the mouth of the Rur river.

While the entrance buildings of the stations in Heinsberg-Randerath, Heinsberg-Porselen and Heinsberg (Rheinl) have been demolished, the station building in Heinsberg-Oberbruch now houses commercial space. Dremmen station has been abandoned.

=== Lindern station ===
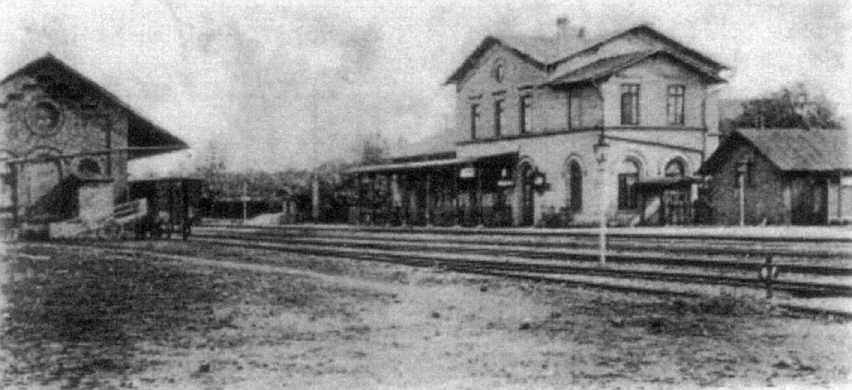
Lindern station in about 1900

In 1852, Lindern received a station able to handle freight on the new Aachen–Mönchengladbach railway. The rail connection is important for commuters in the immediate vicinity (Heinsberg/Linnich). There is now a restaurant and a kiosk in the Lindern station building. The two signal boxes were abandoned after the opening of an electronic signalling centre at the end of 2007 and the set of points at the western end were dismantled. Lindern became a Haltestelle (literally a halt place), since the line to Heinsberg now started from the main line at a junction and the halt was close to it. For the reactivation of the line to Heinsberg, the connections to the turnout at the western end were rebuilt and the station and the signalling were adapted.

The route of the Wurm Valley railway begins in Lindern. Directly after the level crossing, opposite the former signal box Lf (western exit from the station), the line branches off to the right towards Randerath and climbs in a curve to the open field between Lindern, Leiffarth and Randerath.

=== Heinsberg-Randerath halt ===
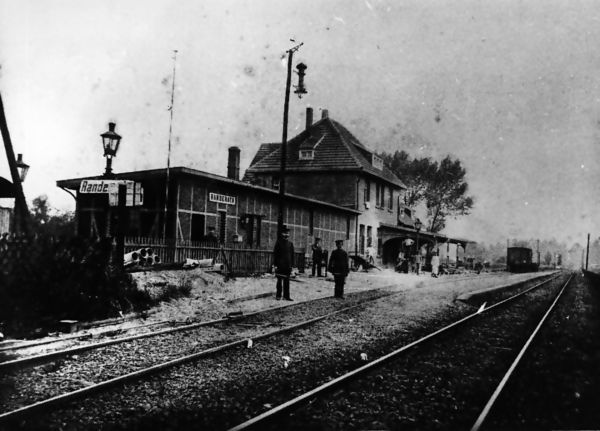
Randerath station (about 1900)

The line runs through slightly hilly countryside to Randerath, which was an independent municipality until 1970. After Randerath the line crosses the Wurm and passes through the lowland next to this river. Randerath station and its entrance building were located on the street of Heerweg at line kilometre 3.2. Randerath station, which was built in 1890, had a loading track between the entrance building and the main track. On the site of the demolished station building there is now among other things a parking lot. The platform of the new halt is located on the line near the road junction of the K16 and the L228.

=== Heinsberg-Horst halt ===
After crossing the Wurm, the line soon passes through the village of Horst. A halt was built in Horst at line kilometre 5.0 for the first time during the resumption of local rail operations in 2013.

=== Heinsberg-Porselen halt ===
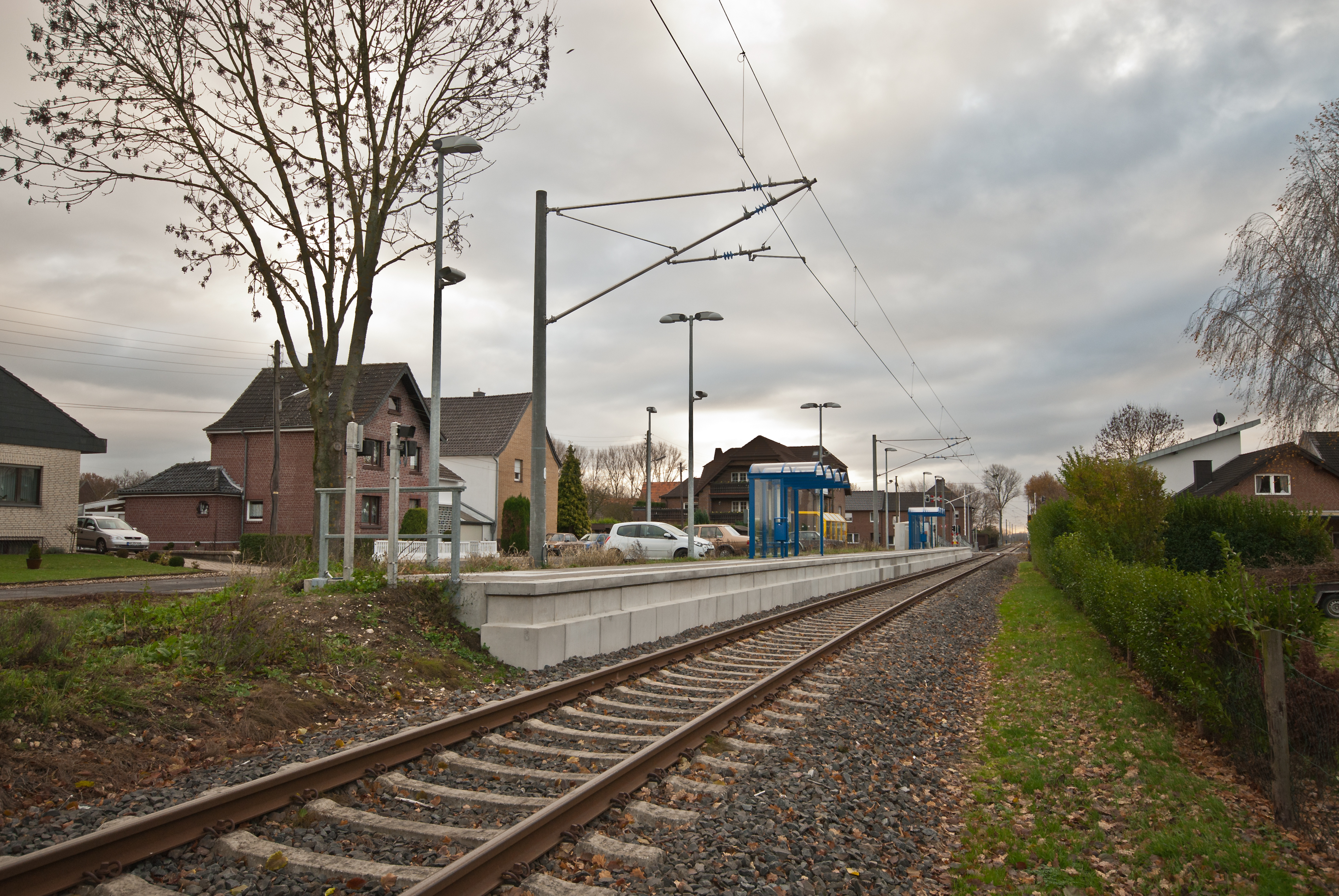
Fully renovated Heinsberg-Porselen halt

Porselen halt follows at line kilometre 6.4. Its platform was initially preserved after passenger services ceased in 1980, but it was completely renewed for the resumption of passenger services.

=== Heinsberg-Dremmen halt ===
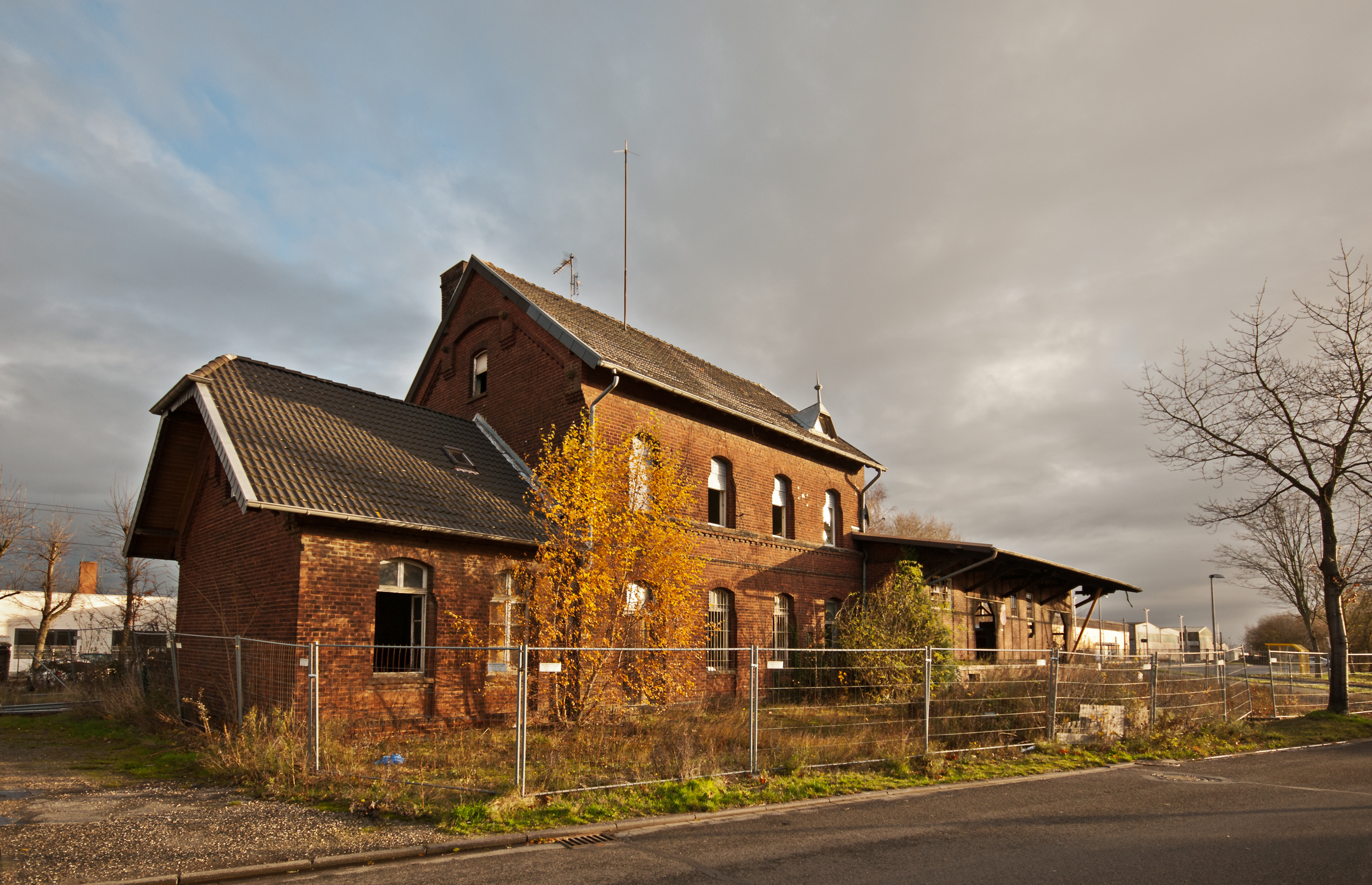
The ruins on the entrance building of the former Heinsberg-Dremmen station is the last remaining building from the time of the line’s construction. In the background on the right is the new Dremmen halt. (Dec. 2013)

The former Dremmen station is located at kilometre 7.8 km on Sootstraße in Dremmen. The loading road, the freight shed and the station building are still in ruins. In the Dremmen station area there were two dead-end tracks for company connections.

=== Heinsberg-Oberbruch station ===
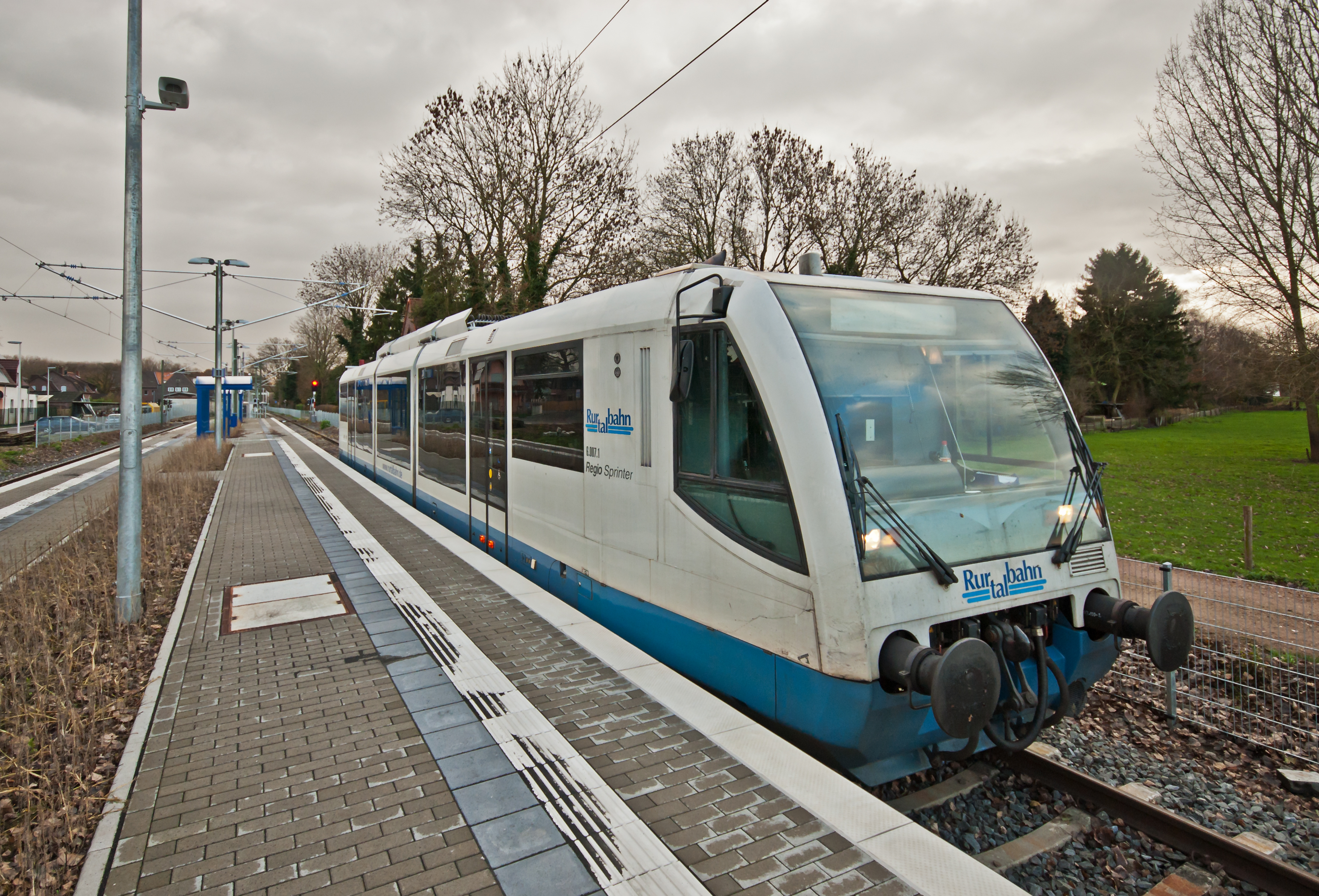
RegioSprinter of the Rurtalbahn in Heinsberg-Oberbruch station (test run on 6 December 2013)

After Dremmen the line runs through a forest until Heinsberg-Oberbruch station is reached. The former station of Oberbruch (formerly Grebben) is located on the Wurm Valley Railway at line kilometre 9.3.

The refurbished station building now serves as a physiotherapist’s practice. There is a temporary signal box at the junction to the chemical park. In the station area, there used to be a loop around the station, a dead-end track and two connecting tracks to the former Akzo works. Two fireless locomotives were available on these for shunting and the hauling of wagons from the station to the works site, even after the turn of the millennium. Parallel to the track, a headshunt runs to about km 9.8, which is shortly before the Kamperstraße level crossing. All traffic from there towards Heinsberg was discontinued on 28 May 1994.

=== Heinsberg Kreishaus halt ===
The new owner, WestEnergie und Verkehr, opened a new halt next to the Kreishaus (district office) in Heinsberg for the re-opening of the line, which had been closed for passenger traffic since 1980. It was established by the operator of the infrastructure, Rurtalbahn, at km 11.0. RB 33 Regionalbahn services operated by DB Regio NRW have served the halt in both directions since the re-opening on 15 December 2013.

=== Heinsberg (Rheinland) station ===
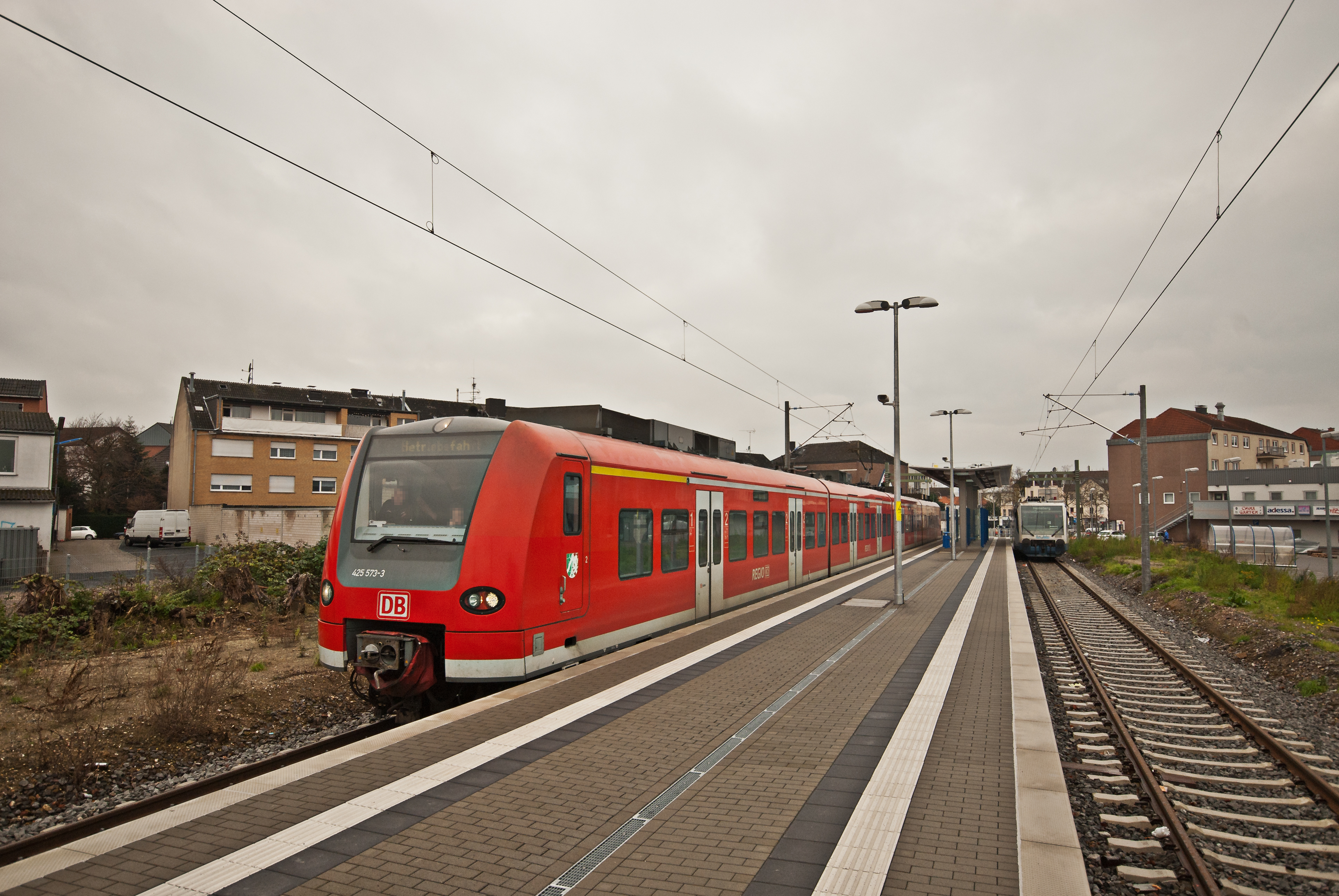
RegioSprinter and class 425 set in the new Heinsberg station, taken on the occasion of the first run of an electric service to Heinsberg on 8 December 2013

The terminus of the line (as of 2013) is in front of Heinsberg bus station and a shopping centre. The line ends in the former freight yard. The former terminal station was at the end point of the line at 12.3 km. Heinsberg station was developed with two tracks, one of which served as a loop. The second track was connected to a short platform. Shortly after the closing of the passenger service to Heinsberg, the entrance building was demolished to make way for the new bus station.
