= Lindern station =

Railway station in Geilenkirchen, Germany

Lindern
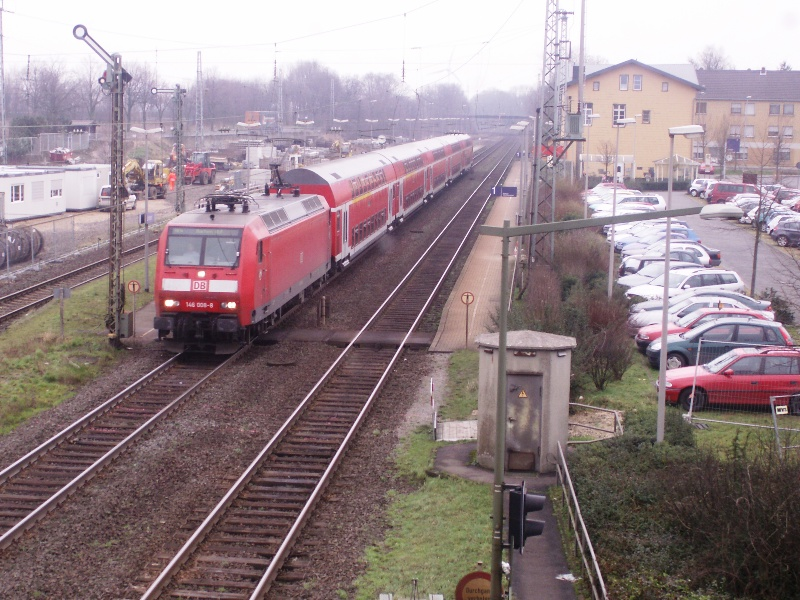

General information
- Location: Linderner Bahn 7, Geilenkirchen-Lindern, NRW; Germany
- Coordinates: 50°59′49″N 6°12′29″E
- Lines: Aachen–Mönchengladbach; Heinsberg–Lindern
- Platforms: 3

Construction
- Accessible: Yes

Other information
- Station code: 3734
- DS100 code: KLD
- IBNR: 8003697
- Category: 4
- Fare zone: AVV: 53; VRS: 3410 (AVV transitional tariff)
- Website: www.bahnhof.de

History
- Opened: 12 November 1852

Services
Preceding station	DB Regio NRW	Following station
Geilenkirchen towards Aachen Hbf	RB 33	Brachelen towards Essen-Steele
Geilenkirchen towards Aachen Hbf	RB 33	Heinsberg-Randerath towards Heinsberg (Rheinland)
Preceding station	National Express Germany	Following station
Geilenkirchen towards Aachen Hbf	RE 4 (Wupper-Express)	Hückelhoven-Baal towards Dortmund Hbf
Location

Lindern station is in Lindern in the German state of North Rhine-Westphalia on the Aachen–Mönchengladbach railway. It is classified by Deutsche Bahn as a category 4 station.

Lindern station is at the junction where the Heinsberg–Lindern railway separates from the Aachen–Mönchengladbach railway. Since the points where the line to Heinsberg now branches off the main line is now to the east of the station, it is considered under the German regulations for operating railways (Eisenbahn-Bau- und Betriebsordnung) as a Haltestelle ("halt place"). The Aachen–Mönchengladbach–Düsseldorf rail link is now important for commuters from the nearby area (Heinsberg/Linnich). The Heinsberg–Lindern line was only used for freight transport between 1980 and 2013. Passenger services on the line to Heinsberg were resumed in 2013. Construction in preparation for the resumption of services commenced in Lindern station in 2012.

== History ==
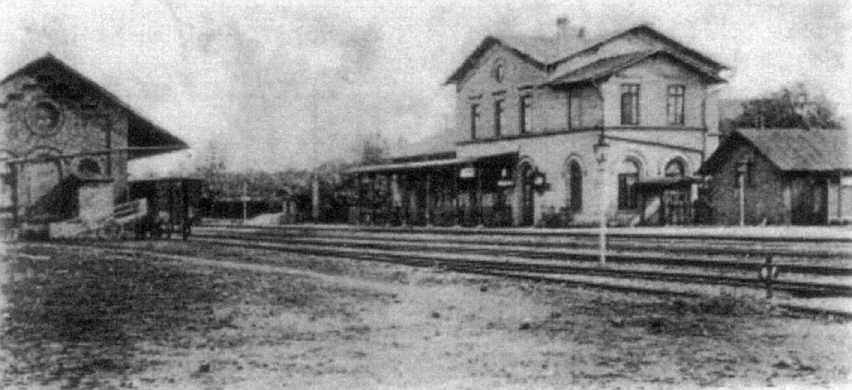
Lindern station about 1900

Lindern station, including the station building, was completed in 1852 and passenger and freight operations were recorded in the same year on the new Aachen–Düsseldorf–Ruhrort railway. The ticket office was closed in 1989 and today (2013) the station building is used as a restaurant and a kiosk, while tickets can be purchased at a vending machine on the platform.

Two mechanical signal boxes are located on the south side of the tracks, code-named Lf (class 43, built in 1950 at the end of the station towards Aachen) and Lo (class Jüdel, built in 1930 at the end of the station towards Mönchengladbach), have been taken out of service since the completion of the second stage of the Grevenbroich electronic signalling centre on 6 November 2007. The points and signals of Lindern station are controlled remotely from the Duisburg signalling control centre.

With the commissioning of the electronic interlocking, the crossovers have been removed at the southern end of the station and the then still existing semaphore signals were replaced with Ks-signals. The station thus became a Haltestelle (a "halt", that is it has no set of points, but is near a junction). Moves towards Mönchengladbach from Heinberg run parallel to the main line past the platform before reaching the junction with the main line.

The Aachener Verkehrsverbund (Aachen Transport Association) and the WestEnergie und Verkehr GmbH (the municipal electrical and transport company of the Heinsberg district) as the owner of the line from Lindern to Heinsberg resumed passenger traffic on the line on 15 December 2013. The operator of the infrastructure is Rurtalbahn GmbH. The line is operated by DB Regio NRW with class 425 electric multiple units.

== Rail services ==
The station is served by the following services:

Line	Line name	Route	
RE 4	Wupper-Express	Aachen – Herzogenrath – Lindern – Erkelenz – Rheydt – Mönchengladbach – Düsseldorf – Wuppertal – Hagen – Witten&nbs – Dortmund	
RB 33	Rhein-Niers-Bahn	Aachen Hbf - Lindern (portions coupled/uncoupled)	– Mönchengladbach – Duisburg – Mülheim – Essen
RB 33	Rhein-Niers-Bahn	Aachen Hbf - Lindern (portions coupled/uncoupled)	– Heinsberg

A portion of the Rhein-Niers-Bahn running from Aachen is uncoupled in Lindern, with the front portion continuing to Duisburg and the back portion reversing to go to Heinsberg. This procedure is reversed in the opposite direction.

== Future ==
There have been considerations that the Jülich–Dalheim railway operated by Rurtalbahn to Linnich would be extended as far as Lindern (as had already been planned at the beginning of the 19th century) to connect with the Heinsberg railway. However, due to the cost of a new bridge over the Rur, this idea has not yet been adopted.
