= Dremmen =

Part of Heinsberg, NRW, Germany

Coordinates: 51.0394°N 6.1467°E

Dremmen (German pronunciation: [ˈdʁɛmən]) is a former municipality in the district of Heinsberg, North Rhine-Westphalia, Germany. It has been part of the district town of Heinsberg since 1972. It includes the main village Dremmen and the villages Herb and Boverath.

== Geography ==
The neighbouring towns are Hülhoven, Grebben in the north-west, Oberbruch in the north, Porselen the east, Randerath in the Southeast and in the South Uetterath.

=== Geology ===
Dremmen is located at the edge of the Rur Valley. It is hillier than the surrounding areas. Meadows, fields and woods dominate the landscape. In some places, there is sand mining.

=== Rivers ===
The River Rur is the largest river in the district it flows past Heinsberg into Bleckden near Dremmen. The Rur frequently floods as far as Oberbruch. The river Wurm is by the North East side of Dremmen where the industrial area is situated by Hückelhoven. A small watercourse called Geilenkirchen-Rischden today runs underground in its place.

== History ==
In the Middle Ages, a Mühlengraben (channel for the operation of water mills) was created, at Randerath where the river Wurm branched off. It ran along the edge of the Wurm. Horst, Porselen, Dremmen and Schafhausen spurred numerous watermills in this period. In the city of Heinsberg, it was destroyed during the Second World War (Jan 1945: Operation Blackcock) and wasn't restored after, the channel was instead used to irrigate agricultural land.

The history of the parish of St. Lambertus can be traced back to the 8th century. The former wooden church burned down in the late 9th century. In the 10th to 11th century, a small hall church made of stone was built at the same place. In 1201, the name of the oldest known pastor of Dremmen was written into the records as: "Nykolaus pastor in drumme". The church hall was repeatedly rebuilt and expanded (Gothic choir Attachments, aisles, Gothic brick tower 1515). In 1716, it burned out completely; after 1721 another new church was built. From 1760, the church seemed too small. By the early 19th century, it was dilapidated. In 1834, the nave was demolished but the tower remained standing. A new three-nave section and room in the classical style was built; In 1835, it was inaugurated. The altar and the modern Calvary dates from the year 1981, the large mural in the presbytery dates from 1993. The organ dates back to 1836, it is from the postwar period with two manuals and 24 registers. In the tower there are five bells that have been hanging since 1953 with the hit tones B0 - c '- it' - f '- g'.

Built in 1890, the railway line Heinsberg-Lindern ("Wurm Switchback") also runs past Dremmen. The local station is no longer used.

On January 1, 1969, Dremmen was incorporated into Oberbruch-Dremmen. Since 1 January 1972, Dremmen has belonged to Heinsberg.

In October 2007, The centre of Dremmen was redesigned including the church, Sidewalks were widened, roads were made narrower and road connections were changed. Pedestrian areas were decoratively paved and separated by green spaces and small walls on the roadway. There is outdoor seating; the village is also called Piazza.

Since 2013, Dremmen has been reconnected to the railway network.

=== Culture and Sights ===
The Dremmener Platt is a variety of the Limburgish language deliberately spoken in the village.

== Attractions ==
• Parish Church of St. Lambertus • Marie monastery with Mariengrotte, chapel and park with a fishing pond • Jägerstraße with old farmhouses • Talmühle • Herber Chapel

See also List of monuments in Heinsberg

== Monuments ==
• Schuster monument (bronze sculpture) • Stele with coat of arms Schöffengericht Dremmen 1559 • Age millstone of the mill Lieck / Heitzer • Millstones of the old Talmühle • Peace Cross in 1947 • Heiligenhäuschen in the canal (to Boverath)

== Education ==
At the time of the 17th century, education in Dremmen was still strongly associated with the local clergy. On October 10, 1659 Reverendus Dominus wrote the "Venerable and Wool Scholars Lord" and "Custode et Ludimagister". (Sexton and teacher) The following list shows the oldest known teacher and clerk are from Dremmen:

- ? - 1623 John Tonsorius (surname also: Rule)
- 1623 - 1659 Peter Buchels (surname also: Gladbach, according to his place of origin) was born about 1590 in "Gladbach" He married Elisabeth Geisen from Randerath and was buried on 10 November 1659 in Dremmen.
- 1659 - 1673 Wilhelm Buchels, his son Peter Buchels was born before 1637 and died in Dremmen on September 13, 1673. He married Agnes Richter from Dremmen on October 9, 1657.

Then, the office of spiritual sexton and the secular teacher was divided. This is the consequence of another schoolmaster of Dremmen:

- 1673 - 1703/04 Peter Buchels the Younger, son of Wilhelm Büchel. Peter Buchels the Younger was baptised on July 14, 1658. He married Margaretha Meybaum from Dremmen on October 30, 1680 and died in 1703 or 1704 in Dremmen.
- 1703/04 - 1724 Johann Wilhelm Jansen.
- 1724 - 1758 Johann Jakob Fassbender. (died at the age of 32 years)
- 1758 - 1797 Peter Vorsprichs.

In the former Marie monastery, there used to be a kindergarten. Today, it is located next to the new primary school. The old primary school and elementary school was on the site of Kirmesplat, which was demolished after the war.

== Notable people ==
- Theodor Esser (1899–1977), born in Dremmen Member of Parliament
- Natalie Diart (born 1966), internationally renowned classical singer
