= Bekkering =

Bekkering is a surname. Notable people with the surname include:

- Annemiek Bekkering (born 1991), Dutch competitive sailor
- Daniëlle Bekkering (born 1976), Dutch marathon speed skater, short track speed skater, and cyclist
- Harold Bekkering (born 1965), Dutch professor of cognitive psychology
- Harry Bekkering (born 1944), Dutch cultural scientist, author and professor
- Henry Bekkering (born 1985), Canadian basketball player
- Pim Bekkering (1931–2014), Dutch football player
- Ross Bekkering (born 1987), Canadian-Dutch basketball player
