= Jos Som =

Dutch politician

J.J.M. (Jos) Som (Didam, 12 October 1951) is a Dutch politician of the Christian Democratic Appeal (CDA).

Originally a teacher, he became an alderman and deputy Mayor of Didam. From 1994 until 1999 he was mayor of Gulpen, and from 1997 he was also acting mayor for the neighbouring municipality of Wittem. On 1 January 1999 these municipalities fused into the new municipality of Gulpen-Wittem, of which he was mayor until the end of 2000. On 16 December 2000 he became mayor of Kerkrade, succeeding Thijs Wöltgens. He was reaffirmed in 2006 and 2012. In 2018 he became acting mayor until he was succeeded by Petra Dassen-Housen.

== Incidents ==
In 2013 he got into the public view due to visiting a French vacation home of project developer Piet van Pol in 2003, who also developed the city centre of Kerkrade. Piet van Pol came into question earlier due to taking bribes from Roermond alderman Jos van Rey. Som states that he was on a local camping when a friend asked him to come to the vacation home. He did not know van Pol personally.

== Honours ==
- 2003 - Sjwatse Kater, a prize for special efforts for Kerkrade
- 2007 - Knight's Cross of the Order of Merit of the Federal Republic of Germany (Verdienstkreuz am Bande), for his efforts in international cooperation between Germany and The Netherlands.

== See also ==
- List of mayors of Kerkrade
