= List of mayors of Kerkrade =

This is a list of mayors of Kerkrade, Netherlands.

In 1982 the municipality of Eygelshoven merged into Kerkrade.

Mayors of Dutch municipalities are appointed by the cabinet in the name of the monarch, with advice of the city council.

== Mayors of Kerkrade ==
Period	Name of Mayor	Party	Notes
?? - ??	Jan Jacob Reinckens		
1800 - ??	Augustinus Goswinus Poyck		
1807 - 1830	Jan Francis Xavier Willebror Lodewijk de Danner		
1830 - 1836	Jean Joseph François Marie Hubert Cornéli		
1836 - 1850	Willem Vaessen		
1850 - 1866	Jacques Herry		
1866 - 1870	J. Henri Jan Savelberg		
1870 - 1880	Winand L.J. Franssen		
1880 - 1901	Karl Ignats Jozef Daelen		
1901 - 1909	Dominique J.M. Savelberg		
1910 - 1915	M.F. Hendricks		
1916 - 1941	Gerardus Hubertus Alphonse Habets		
1941 - 1943	A.M.P Thomassen	NSB	
1943 - 1944	T.A.A.M Copray	NSB	
1944 - 1948	Gerardus Hubertus Alphonse Habets		
1948 - 1951	Albertus Petrus Johannes Marie Lempers		
1951 - 1957	Cornelus Johannes Gerardus Becht		
1958 - 1969	Theo Gijsen		
1970 - 1989	Jo Smeets	KVP / CDA	
1989 - 1994	Jan Mans	PvdA	
1994 - 2000	Thijs Wöltgens	PvdA	
2000–present	Jos Som	CDA	

== See also ==
- List of mayors of Eygelshoven
