= Mayor Peters =

Mayor Peters may refer to:

- Andrew J. Peters (1872–1938), mayor of Boston, Massachusetts, United States
- Bobby Peters (born 1949), mayor of Columbus, Georgia, United States
- Michael P. Peters, mayor of Hartford, Connecticut, United States
- Paul Peters (mayor) (born 1942), mayor of multiple municipalities in the Netherlands
