= LTM 53 =

Limburgsche Tramweg Maatschappij (LTM) 53 was a locomotive built by Krupp, serial number 737, in 1924. It entered service for Krupp factories in Essen in 1925. It was used as a plant switcher. The LTM purchased the locomotive in 1932, for coal service between Echt NS and Maasbracht Haven (harbour), which was operated by the LTM. This service terminated in 1936. Mining company Laura & Vereeninging (Eijgelshoven, The Netherlands) purchased the locomotive in 1937, and it entered service with the name Julia III at mine Julia. In 1962 the identifier was changed in LV 11. In 1944 it was temporarily rented out to the Staatsmijnen (SM), for a few months. The SM had rented a C locomotive to the NS workshops in Maastricht and used this locomotive as a replacement.
