= List of mayors of Eygelshoven =

This is a list of mayors of Eygelshoven, a former municipality in the southeast Netherlands.

In 1982 the municipality of Eygelshoven merged into Kerkrade.

== Mayors of Eygelshoven ==
- 1857 - 1881 W.D. Wimmers
- 1881 - 1886 F.M.H. Valckenberg
- 1886 - 1919 L. Dohmen
- 1919 - 1928 Willem M. Loyson
- 1928 - 1934 J.H. Martin
- 1934 - 1969 H.J. Boijens
- 1969 - 1975 J.G.A. Janssen
- 1975 - 1982 J.H.C. Persoon

== See also ==
- List of mayors of Kerkrade
