= Didam =

- Town
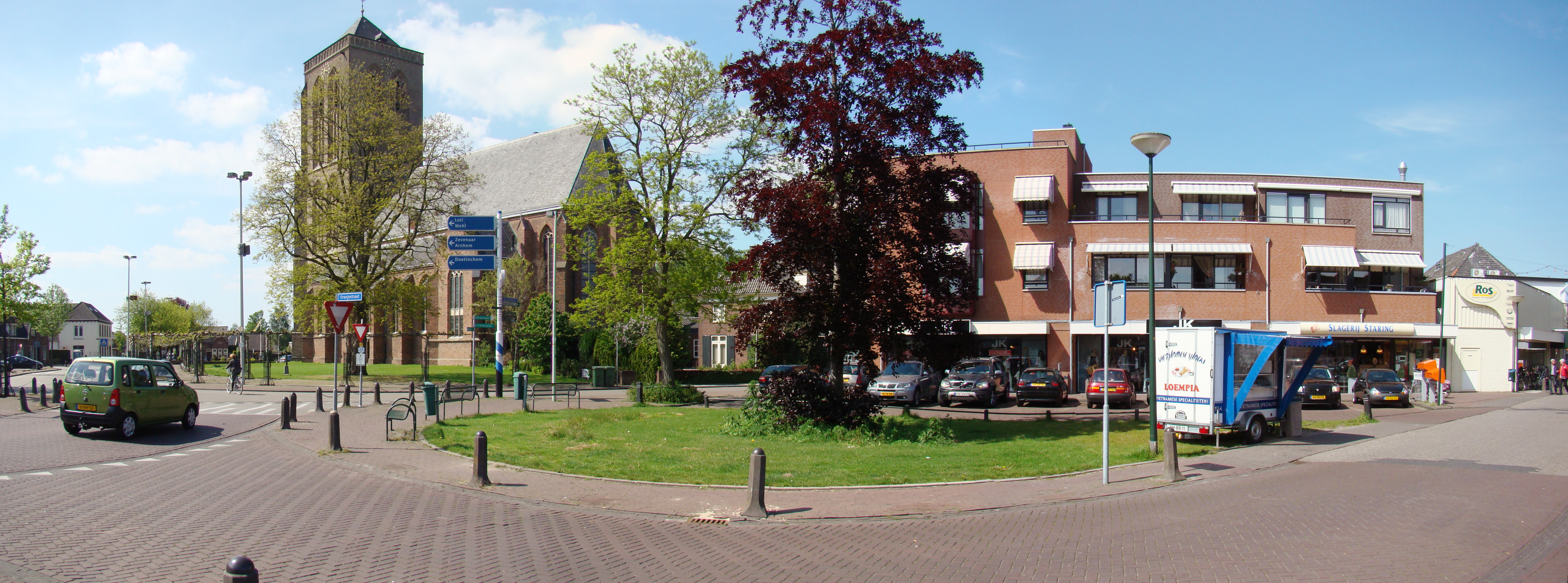
- City centre of Didam (2010)

- Flag Coat of arms

- Location in the province of Gelderland in the Netherlands Didam (Netherlands)
- Coordinates: 51°56′N 6°08′E
- Country: Netherlands
- Province: Gelderland
- Municipality: Montferland

Area
  - Total: 3.07 km^{2} (1.19 sq mi)
- Elevation: 12 m (39 ft)

Population (2021)
  - Total: 17,812
  - Density: 5,800/km^{2} (15,000/sq mi)
- Time zone: UTC+1 (CET)
  - Summer (DST): UTC+2 (CEST)
- Postal code: 6942
- Dialing code: 0316

Didam (locally, Diem) is a town in the eastern part of Netherlands in the region of "De Liemers", province of Gelderland. It is located in the municipality of Montferland about 18 km east of Arnhem, which is the capital of the province, and about 11 km west from Doetinchem, which is the capital of the Achterhoek region.

== History ==
People in Didam speak a dialect called "Diems" (which is part of dialects of the "Liemers" region, as well part of the larger Kleverlandish dialect area) which is very similar to Diems. These two dialects are part of the Lower Franconian.

Didam was a separate municipality until 1 January 2005, when it merged with Bergh to create the new municipality of Montferland. The church is dedicated to St. Mary.

== Transport ==
The Didam railway station was opened on 15 July 1885 and is located on the Winterswijk–Zevenaar railway line.

== Notable people ==
- Everard Ter Laak (5 November 1868 – 5 May 1931), Dutch Roman Catholic missionary.
- Paul Peters (born 1942 in Roosteren), Dutch politician.
- Jos Som (born 1951 in Didam), Dutch politician.
- Theo Rasing (born 1953 in Didam), Dutch professor of experimental physics.
- Ernie Brandts (born 1956 in Didam), Dutch football manager and former player.
- Geert Hammink (born 1969 in Didam), Dutch professional basketball player.
- Manfred Dikkers (born 1971 in Didam), Dutch drummer.
- Geert-Jan Derksen (born 1975 in Didam), Dutch rower.

== Gallery ==
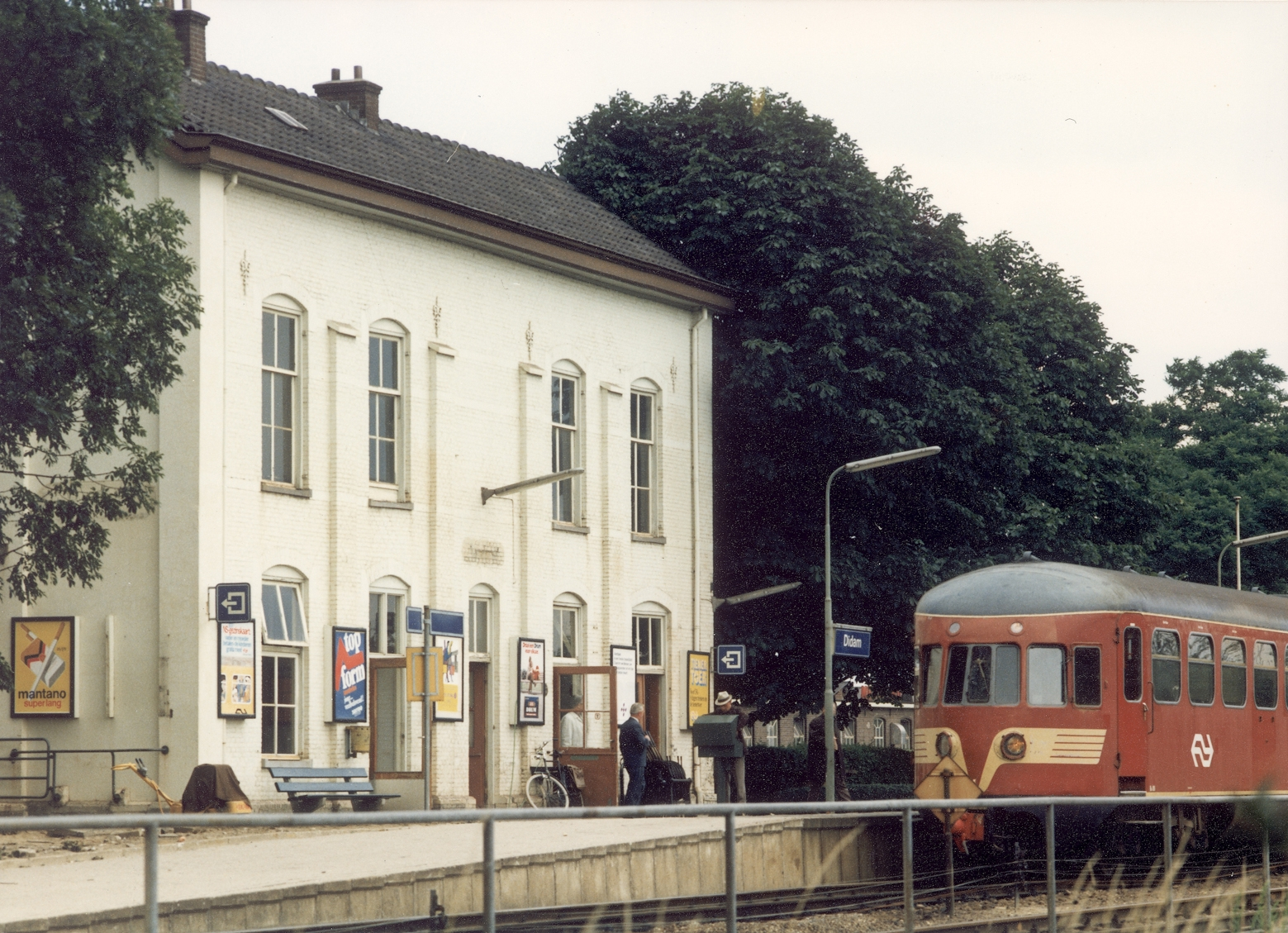
Didam railway station, 1973

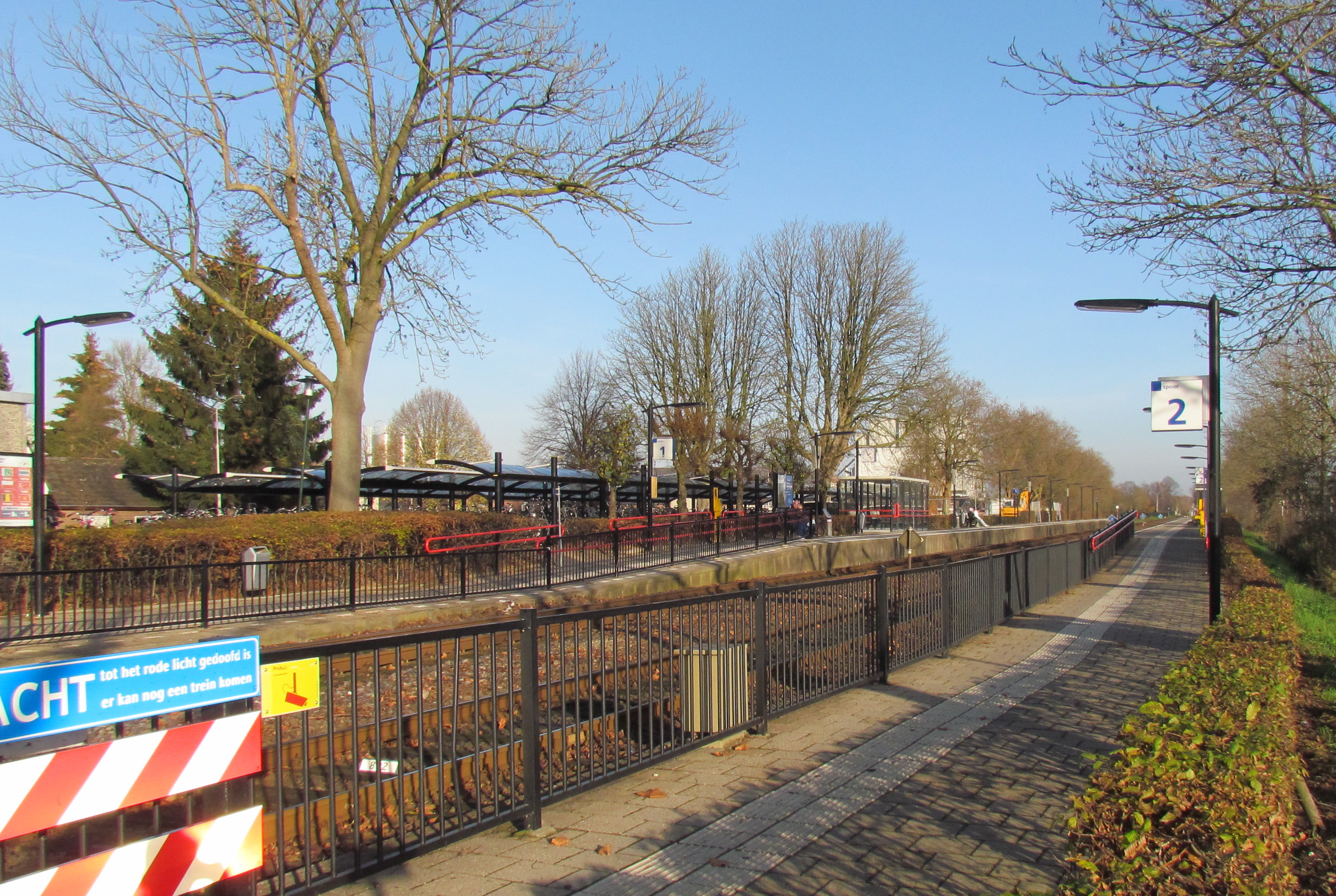
Didam railway station, 2011

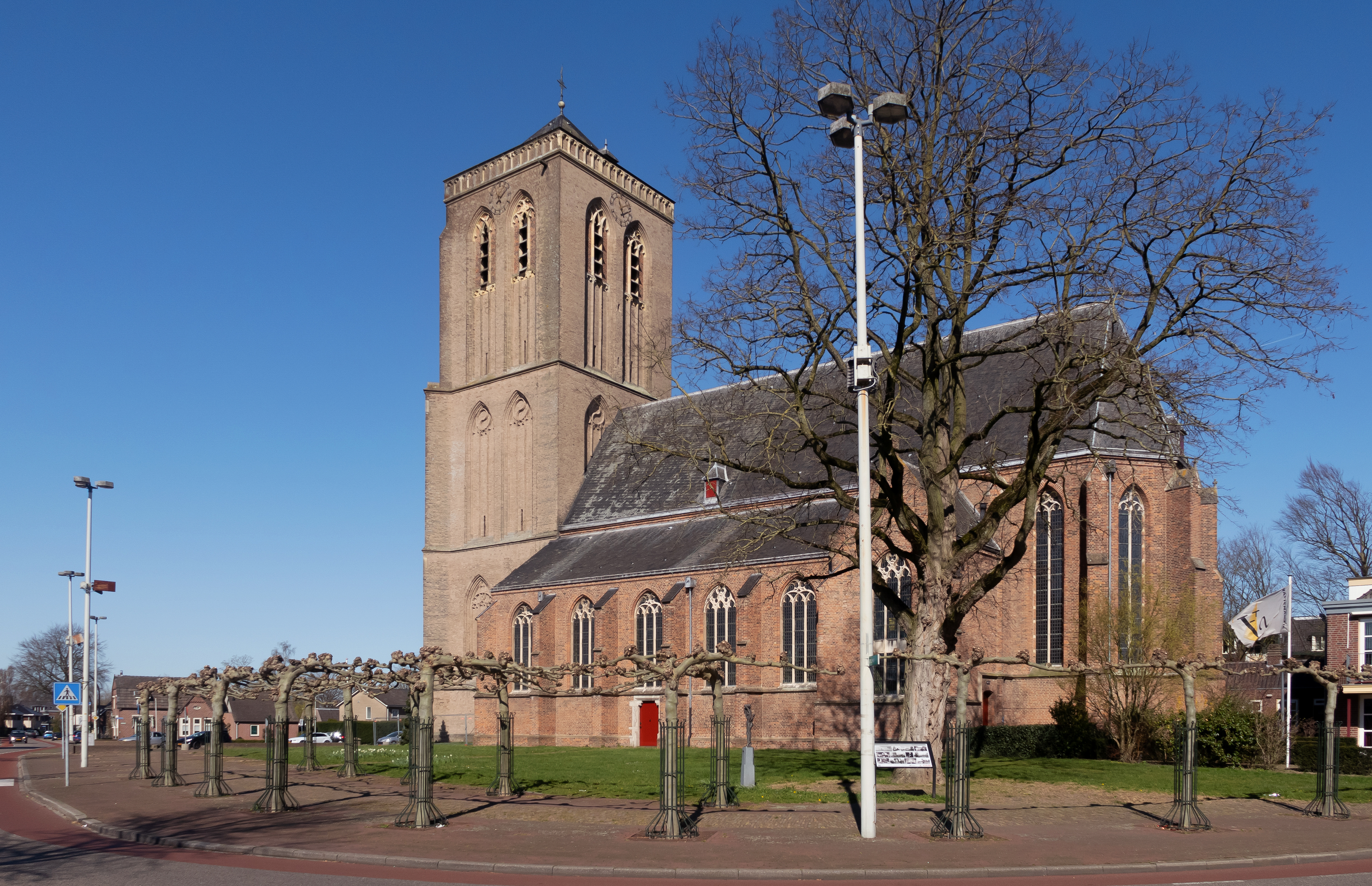
Didam, St. Mary church

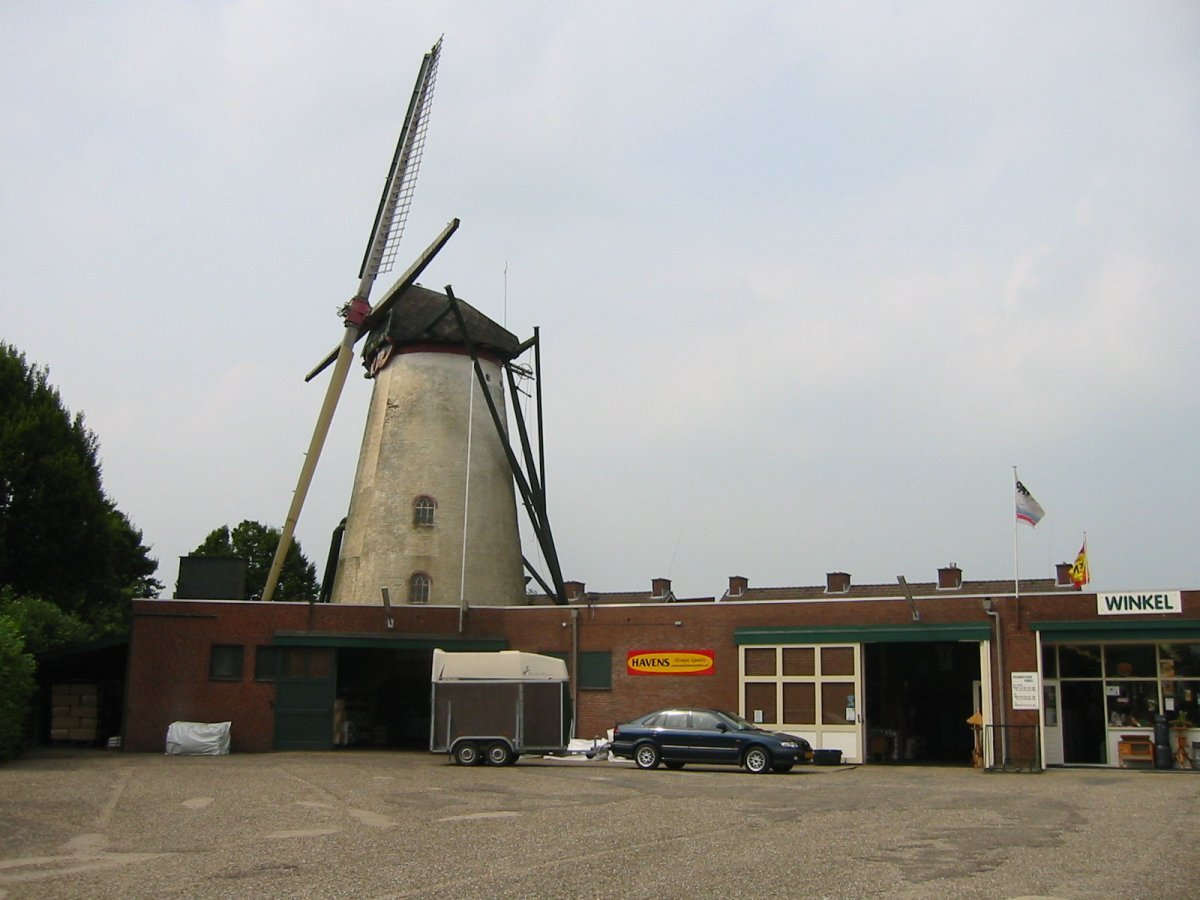
Windmill Sint Martinus

== See also ==
- Didam (disambiguation)
