= Sint Martinus, Didam =

Dutch windmill

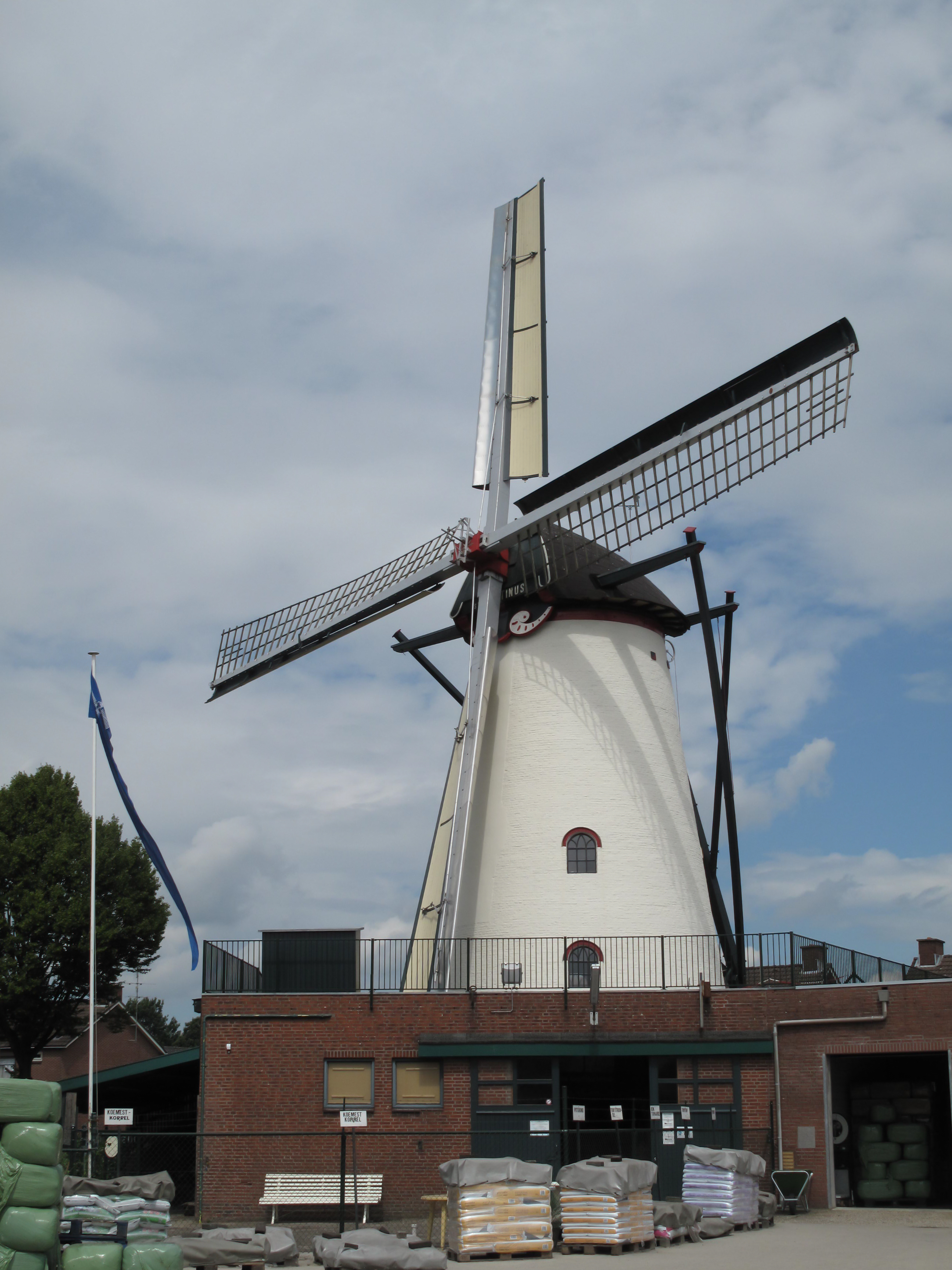
- The mill in July 2010

Origin
- Mill name: Sint Martinus
- Mill location: Molenhoek 16a, 6942 EW, Didam
- Coordinates: 51°56′13″N 6°08′07″E
- Operator(s): Stichting St. Martinusmolen
- Year built: 1855

Information
- Purpose: Corn mill
- Type: Tower mill
- Storeys: Three storeys
- No. of sails: Four sails
- Type of sails: One pair Common sails, Fauël system on leading edges, one pair Ten Have sails, Van Bussel system on leading edges
- Windshaft: Cast iron
- Winding: Tailpole and winch
- No. of pairs of millstones: One pair
- Size of millstones: 1.50 metres (4 ft 11 in) diameter

Sint Martinus (English: Saint Martin) is a tower mill in Didam, Gelderland, Netherlands which was built in 1855 and has been restored to working order. The mill is listed as a Rijksmonument.

== History ==
In 1854, Theodorus Kempers was given permission to build a corn and pearl barley mill at Didam. The mill was completed in 1855. In 1942, the sails were fitted with streamlined leading edges on the Van Bussel system. Later, two Ten Have sails were fitted. On 12 November 1964, the mill caught fire. It was subsequently restored. In 1973, the mill stopped working because a pair of sails were loose in the canister of the windshaft. The mill was returned to working order in 1977. The work was carried out by millwright Groot Wesseldijk of Laren, North Holland. By 1997, the mill was again in need of restoration, and a planning application was made for the replacement of the sails. It was not until 2007 that the mill was restored to working order. The mill being sold in that year to the Stichting St. Martinusmolen. Sint Martinusmolen is listed as a Rijksmonument, № 12869.

== Description ==
Sint Martinusmolen is what the Dutch call a "Beltmolen". It is a three storey tower mill built into a mound which is 3.70 metres (12 ft 2 in) high. There is no stage, the sails reaching almost down to ground level. The cap is covered in dakleer. Winding is by tailpole and winch. The sails are a pair of Common sails, fitted with the Fauël system on their leading edges; and a pair of Ten Have sails, fitted with the Van Bussel system on their leading edges. They have a span of 23.70 metres (77 ft 9 in). They are carried on a cast iron windshaft. The windshaft also carries the brake wheel, which has 59 cogs. This drives a wallower with 32 cogs, which is situated at the top of the upright shaft. At the bottom of the upright shaft is the great spur wheel, which has 95 cogs. This drives a pair of 1.50 metres (4 ft 11 in) diameter French Burr millstones via a lantern pinion stone nut with 27 staves.

== Public access ==
Sint Martinus is open on Saturday from 10:00 to 16:00, or by appointment.
