= Sjra Schoffelen =

Dutch sculptor (born 1937)

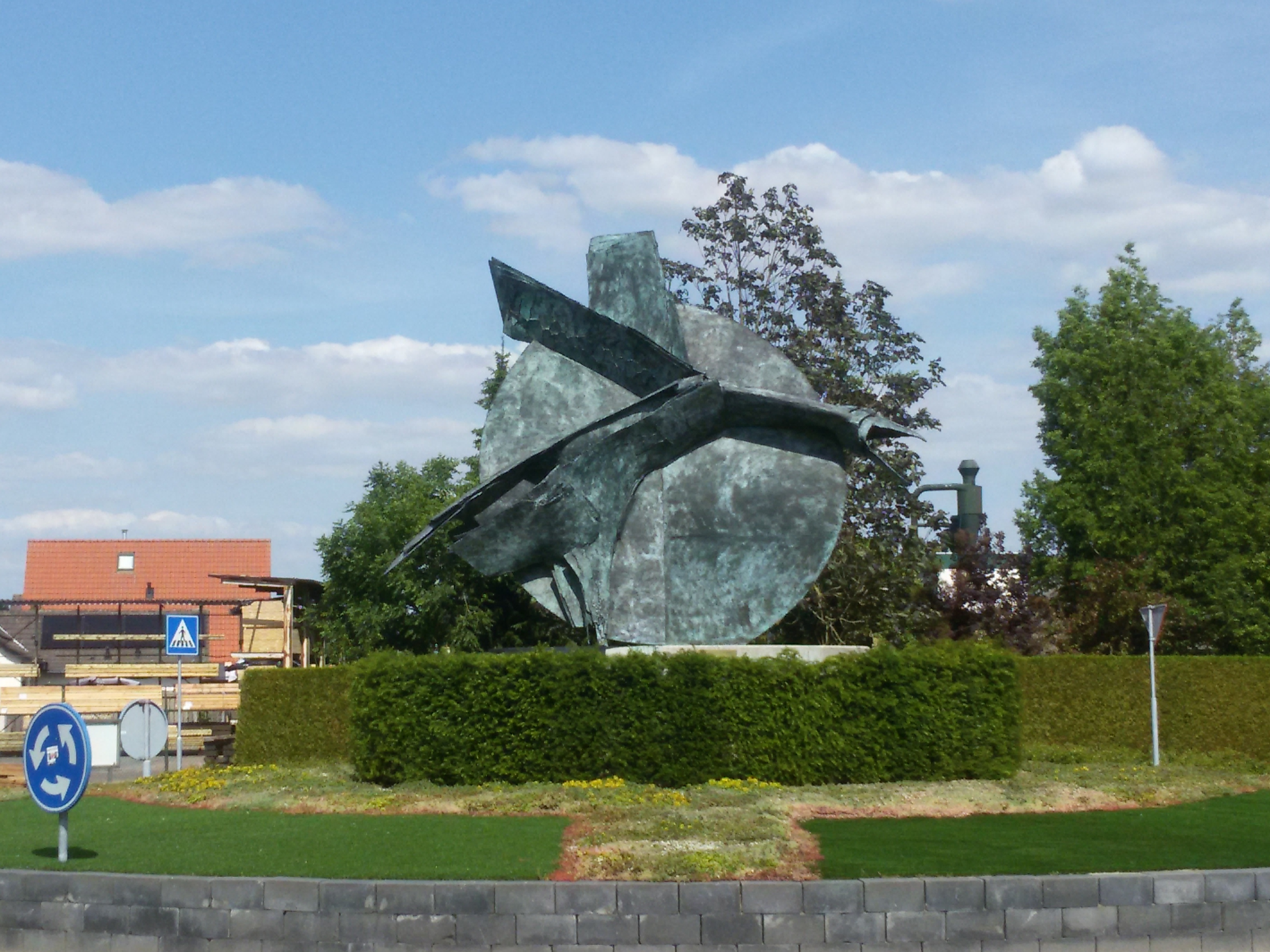
Zonnevogel (1998)

Gerardus Cornelius (Sjra) Schoffelen (Roosteren, 1 August 1937) is a Dutch sculptor.

Schoffelen studied at the Maastricht Institute of Arts (1953-1957) and the Jan van Eyck Academie (1958–1962) in Maastricht and the Staatliche Hochschule für Bildende Künste in Berlin (1962–1964). He was a student of Fred Carasso and Bernhard Heiliger, among others. In 1969 he won the Henriëtte Hustinx Prize.

Schoffelen was a teacher at the Katholieke Leergangen in Tilburg (1970–1979) and the Academy of Visual Arts in Maastricht (1971–1990). As a sculptor he produced fountain statues, portraits and free sculptures, often abstract from an organic point of view. He joined the Beroepsvereniging van Beeldende Kunstenaars and the Nederlandse Kring van Beeldhouwers. Schoffelen lives and works in the Etzenraderhuuske near Jabeek.

In 2019 a book celebrating his 60 years as an artist was published.

== Works in the public space (selection) ==
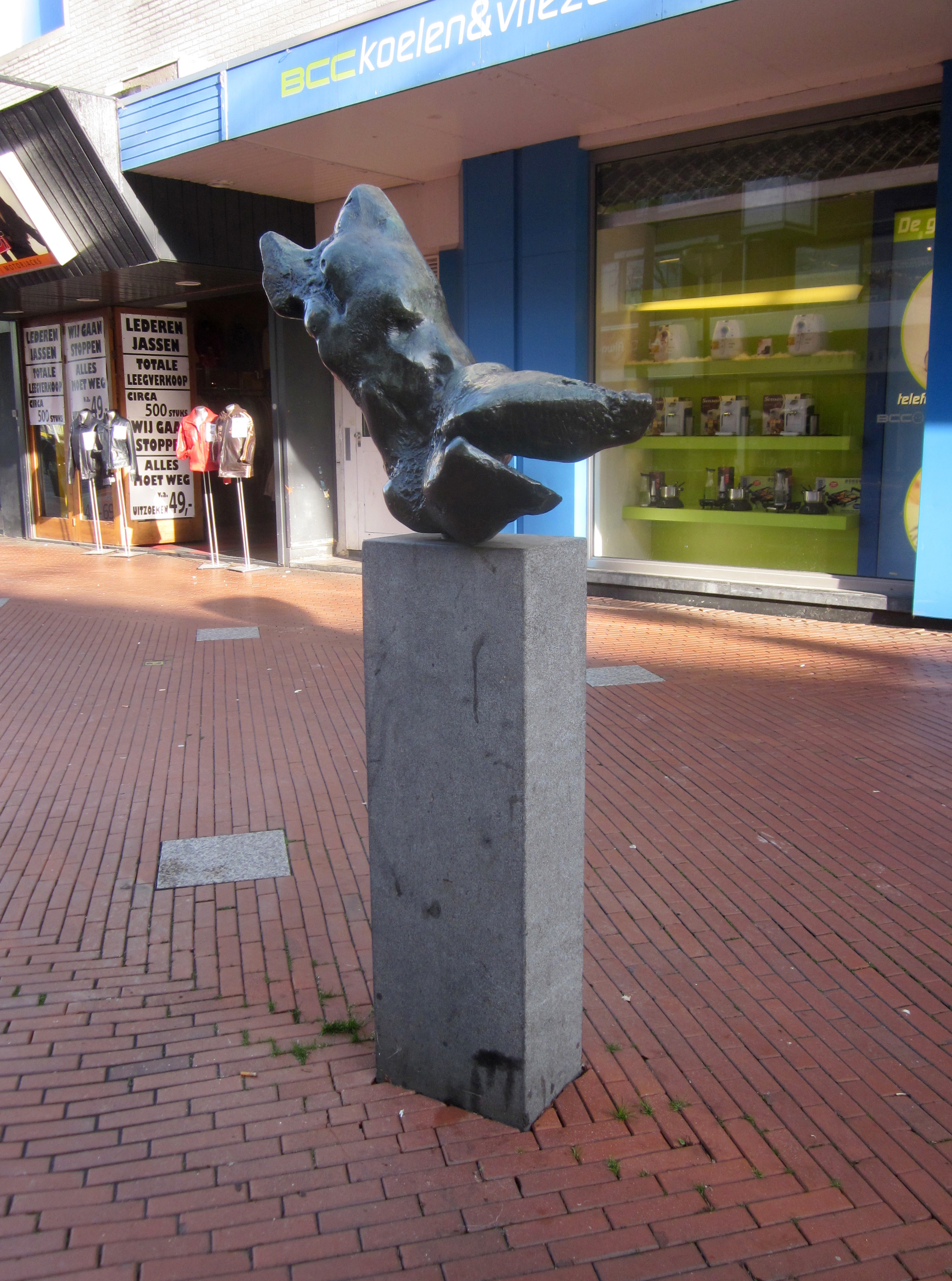
Torso, Eindhoven

- Afsluitpaal met haringen (1955), Maastricht
- Sint Joris te paard (1956), Maastricht
- Moeder en kind (1971), Lelystad
- Grijpende vormen (1980), Dronten
- Relatie (1987), Onze Lieve Vrouweplein, Maastricht
- Zonnevogel (1998), Horst
- Relatie (1999), Roosteren
- Carnavalsbeeld (2010), Buchten
- Relatie I (2013), Meerssen
- Koningsvogelschieten, Venray
- Torso, Eindhoven
