= Theo Rasing =

Dutch experimental physicist

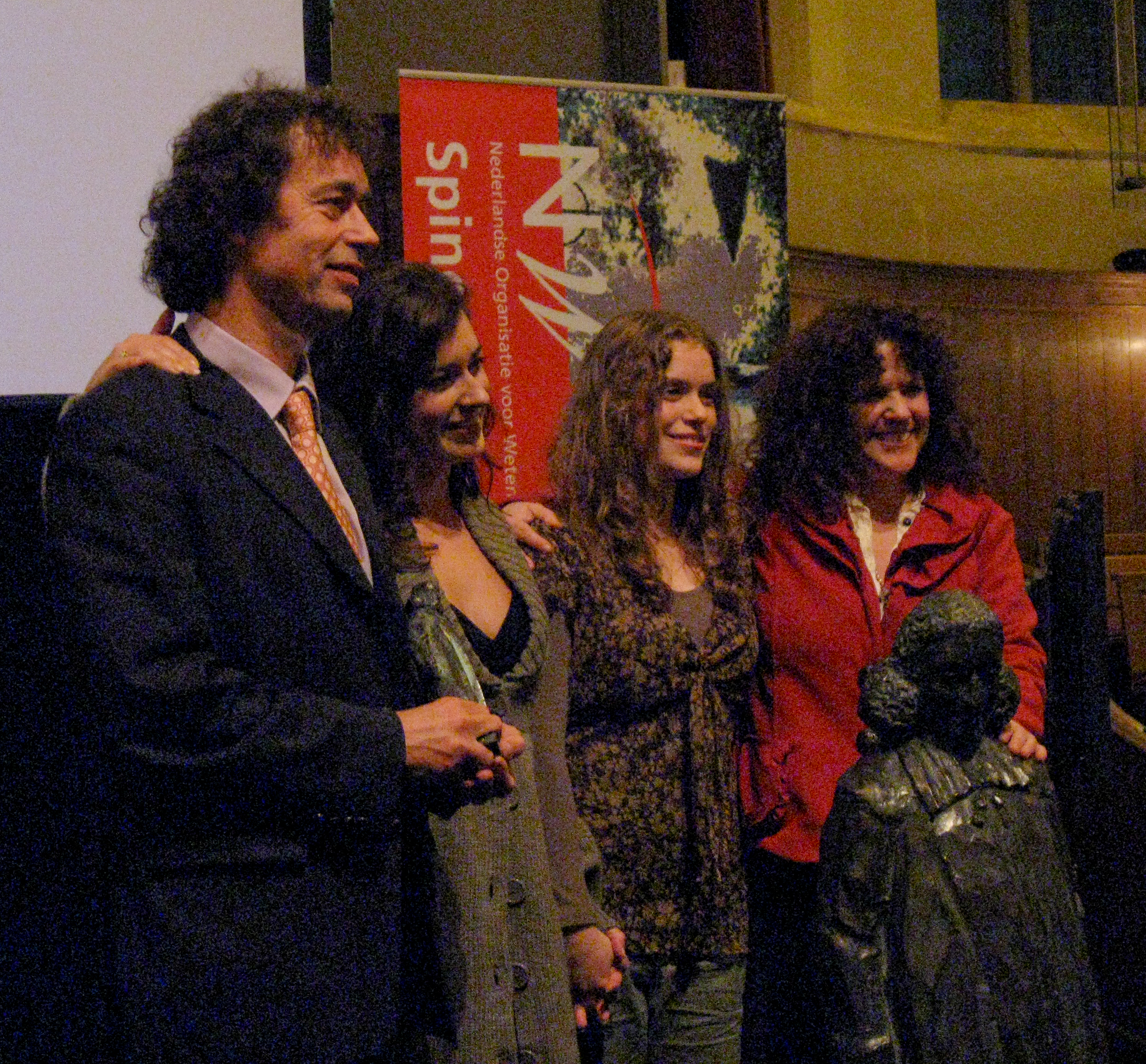
- Rasing accepting the Spinoza Prize in 2008
- Born: 26 May 1953 (age 73); Didam, Netherlands
- Citizenship: Netherlands
- Education: Radboud University Nijmegen
- Awards: Spinoza Prize (2008)
- Scientific career
- Fields: Physics, magneto-optics
- Thesis: Experimental investigation of 4-dimensional super space crystals (1982)
- Doctoral advisors: Prof. A.G.M. Janner, Prof. P. Wyder
- Website: https://www.ru.nl/english/people/rasing-t/

Theodorus "Theo" Henricus Maria Rasing (born 26 May 1953) is a Dutch professor of experimental physics at Radboud University Nijmegen. His expertise lies in the field of magneto-optics. He was a winner of the 2008 Spinoza Prize.

== Career ==
Rasing was born on 26 May 1953 in Didam. In 1976 he obtained a cum laude degree in physics from Radboud University Nijmegen. He obtained his doctorate from the same university in 1982. In 1997 he became professor at Radboud University Nijmegen.

In 2008 he was one of four winners of the Dutch Spinoza Prize and received a 1,5 million euro grant. In 2013 Rasing won a 2,5 million euro Advanced Grant by the European Research Council for a research proposal titled 'magnetisation at its fastest'.

Rasing was elected a member of the Royal Netherlands Academy of Arts and Sciences in 2010. In the same year he was made a Knight of the Order of the Netherlands Lion. Rasing was elected a member of the Academia Europaea in 2013.

In February 2015 the Dutch newspaper de Volkskrant listed Rasing second on a list of funds obtained by researchers.
