= Paul Peters (mayor) =

Dutch politician (born 1942)

Mayor of Lingewaard
- In office 2006–2007
- Preceded by: Rob Persoon
- Succeeded by: Harry de Vries

Mayor of Montferland
- Preceded by: Office established
- Succeeded by: Ina Leppink-Schuitema

Mayor of Didam
- In office 1992–2005
- Preceded by: Joop van Gils
- Succeeded by: Office abolished

Mayor of Belfeld
- In office 1981–1992
- Preceded by: Piet Visschers
- Succeeded by: Frans van Beeck

Mayor of Wijlre
- In office 1975–1982
- Preceded by: C. F. M. van Hövell tot Westervlier en Wezeveld
- Succeeded by: Office abolished

Personal details
- Born: 1942 (age 83–84) Roosteren, Limburg, Netherlands
- Party: Catholic People's Party; Christian Democratic Appeal

P.J.J.M. (Paul) Peters (Roosteren, 1942) is a Dutch politician of the Catholic People's Party and later the Christian Democratic Appeal.

He was born as the son of the head teacher and later politician Jan Mathijs Peters. He himself was chief commissioner at the municipal secretariat in Ede and also a municipal councilor in Heteren before he became mayor of the Limburg municipality of Wijlre in November 1975, which ceased to exist on 1 January 1982 and was divided among the new municipalities of Margraten and Gulpen. In August 1981 Peters was appointed mayor of the municipality of Belfeld and in June 1992 he was appointed mayor of Didam. On 1 January 2005, the municipalities of Didam and Bergh merged to form the new municipality Montferland, of which Peters was acting mayor until Ina Leppink-Schuitema succeeded him there in September 2005. From June 2006 he was acting mayor of Lingewaard for almost a year.

In August 2010, he was one of the concerned CDA members who, by signing a manifesto, publicly indicated that they were against the CDA's participation in a government coalition with the support of the PVV (later the First Rutte cabinet).
