= Janine Kitzen =

Dutch singer

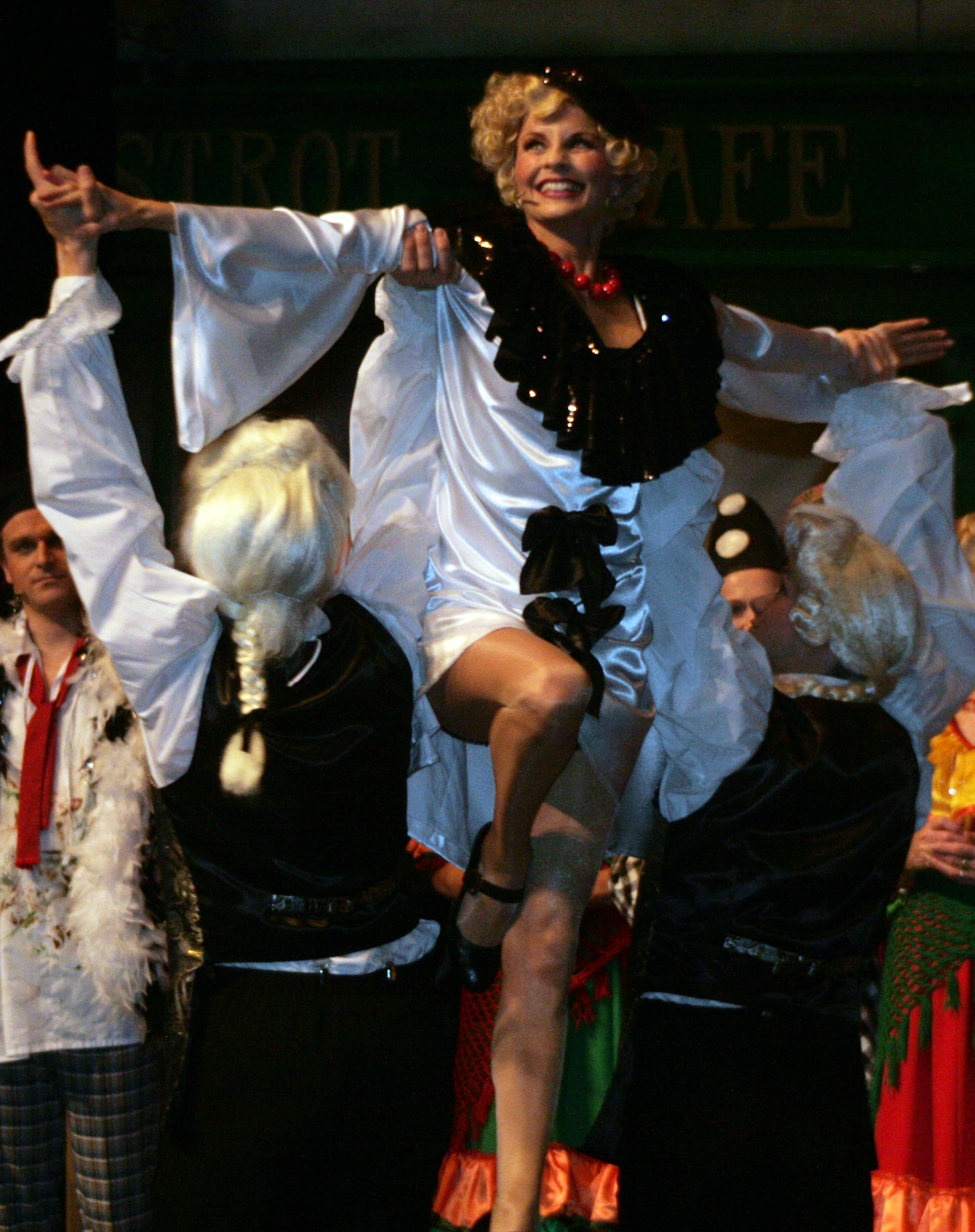
- Kitzen, December 2013

Background information
- Born: 1 March 1978 (age 47); Kerkrade, Netherlands
- Genres: Opera, operatic pop, musical theatre
- Occupation: soprano singer
- Years active: 1996–present
- Website: janine-kitzen.com

Janine Kitzen (born 1 March 1978 in Kerkrade, The Netherlands) is a soprano singer in opera and musical theatre. Although she was born in a family with no real musical background, Kitzen knew from an early age she wanted to build a career in singing. At the age of ten, she sang her first public solo guided by André Rieu.

Kitzen studied solo singing at the Maastricht Academy of Music. After finishing this study successfully in 2001, she continued with a one-year program of musical theatre at the Fontys University of Applied Sciences in Tilburg. During her study, the soprano performed in leading roles in operas, operettas and musicals. For example, she played Bastienne in Mozart's opera Bastien und Bastienne. In 1998 she won the first prize at the television contest Una Voce Particolare.

After her studies, Kitzen continued performing and played in numerous productions including her role as leading character Christine in Andrew Lloyd Webber's The Phantom of the Opera and, more recently, during the 2010 Monschau Klassik festival as Zerlina in Mozart's Don Giovanni.

== Recordings ==
Kitzen has made several recordings. Following the television show Una Voce Particolare, she recorded a CD as part of the quartet Luxus. She introduced her first single "Only Love" and has created a solo CD My Musical Diary with combinations of sounds from musicals and pop-music.
