= Didam (disambiguation) =

Didam may refer to:

== People ==
- Musa Didam (1933–2018), former District Head of the Fantswam (Kafanchan Kewaye)
- Wilhelm Schneider-Didam (1869–1923), German portrait painter

== Places ==
- Didam, town in the Netherlands
- Didam railway station, located in Didam, Netherlands
