= Jerome Lambrechts =

Dutch politician (1839–1896)

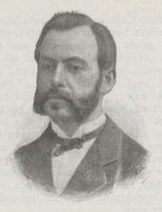
- Jerome Lambrechts, c. 1894

Member of House of Representatives
- In office 1873–1896

Personal details
- Born: Hieronymus Franciscus Lambrechts; 12 October 1839 Roosteren, Limburg, Netherlands
- Died: 25 November 1896 (aged 57) Papenhoven, Limburg, Netherlands
- Party: Roman Catholic (Conservative)

Hieronymus Franciscus (Jerôme) Lambrechts (12 October 1839 – 25 November 1896) was a Dutch politician.

Lambrechts was a Limburg lawyer and school overseer who was a representative for the Roermond district. As one journalist wrote, he belonged to the 'incumbent members'. He spoke rarely and always briefly.

Lambrechts was a son of Jan Jacob Lambrechts (1804–1858), Member of Parliament from 1849–1850 and Maria Gertudis Nelissen (–1900). He was a member of the House of Representatives for more than twenty years. Lambrechts died in 1896 in Papenhoven.
