= Harry Bekkering =

Dutch cultural scientist (born 1944)

Harry Bekkering (born in 1944 in Roosteren) is a Dutch cultural scientist. He is an author and associate professor at the Katholieke Universiteit Nijmegen.

Bekkering was born in 1944 in Roosteren. For several years, he was a professor of Language and Culture Studies at the Radboud University Nijmegen, specializing in children's and youth literature. He obtained his doctorate for research into Simon Vestdijk's essayistics. In the 1980s and 1990s, he was a board member and chairman of the Vestdijkkring. He was also a board member of the Jan Campert Foundation. In 1989, he published his first book De eeuw van Sien en Otje. De twintigste eeuw, followed by De hele Bibelebontse berg: De geschiedenis van het kinderboek in Nederland & Vlaanderen van de Middeleeuwen tot heden, published the same year with Querido in Amsterdam.

== Works ==
- De eeuw van Sien en Otje. De twintigste eeuw (1989)
- De hele Bibelebontse berg (1989)
- Veroverde traditie. De poëticale opvattingen van S. Vestdijk (1989)
- De bloemlezing als breekijzer (1997)
- Ik had wel duizend levens en ik nam er maar één! Cees Nooteboom (1997)
