= Harold Bekkering =

Dutch professor of cognitive psychology

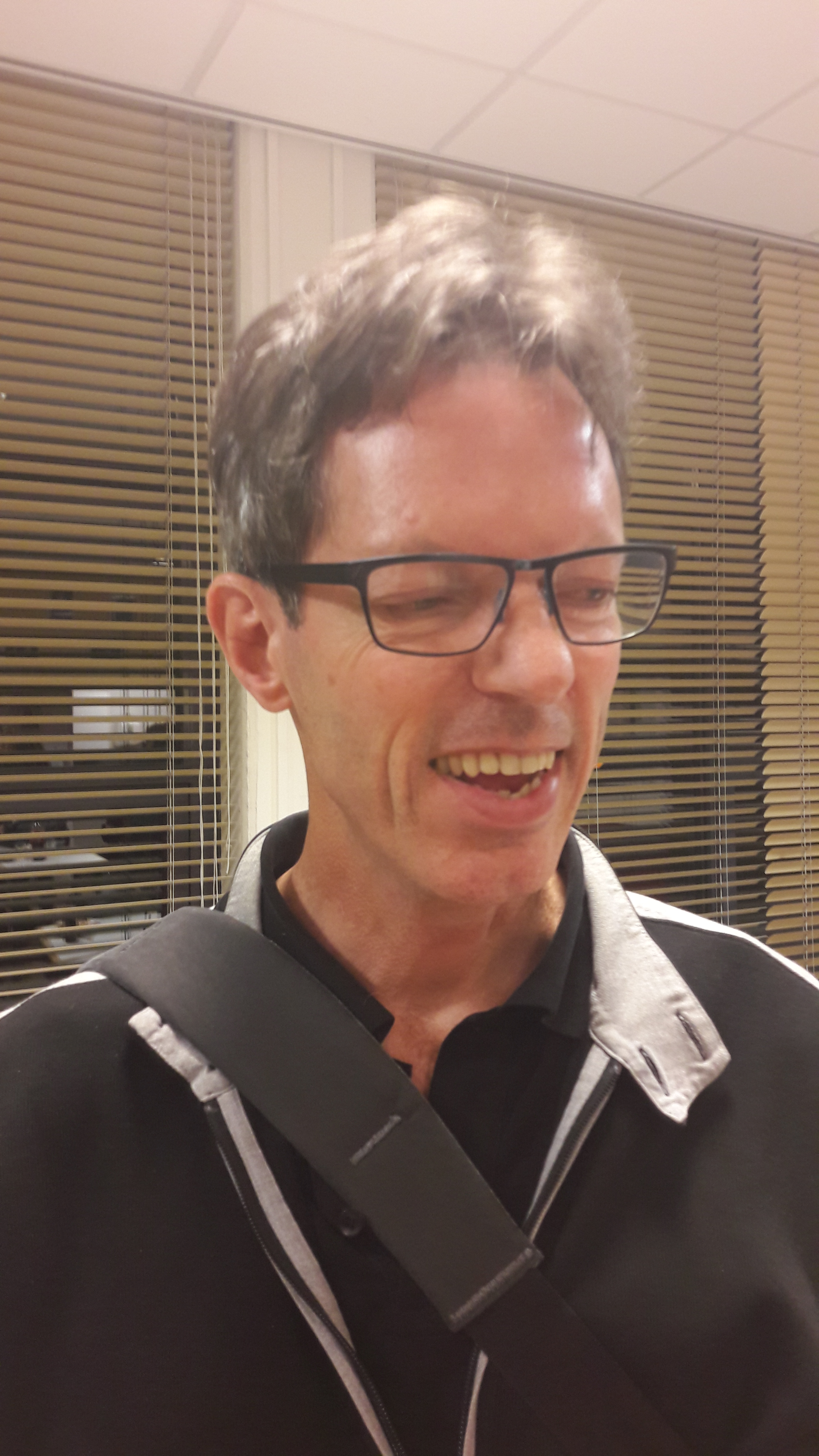
Harold Bekkering

Harold Bekkering (born 19 October 1965) is a Dutch professor of cognitive psychology at the Donders Institute for Brain, Cognition and Behaviour of the Radboud University Nijmegen. His research has covered many different ways of learning, ranging from basic sensorimotor learning to complex forms of social learning. Lately, he aims to implement knowledge about human learning in educational settings.

== Career ==
Bekkering was born in Oldenzaal on 19 October 1965. He studied psychology at the Radboud University Nijmegen between 1985 and 1990 and obtained a B.Sc. He obtained an MA in cognitive psychology in 1990. Five years later he obtained a PhD from Maastricht University. In 2000, he obtained his habilitation from LMU Munich.

Between May 1995 and December 2000 Bekkering was a senior researcher at the Max Planck Institute for Psychological Research. The next two years he was an associate professor at the University of Groningen. In October 2002 he was appointed a professor of cognitive psychology. Bekkering's field of research is broad, covering amongst others developmental and cognitive psychology, the implementation of cognition in robotics and cognitive neuroscience.

In the book De lerende mens Bekkering and Jurjen, van der Helden expressed their findings and opinions on the future of education. Concerning the digitalization of education and especially the use of Internet Bekkering expects a broader, rather than deeper development of students, leading to a new kind of Homo universalis. The two authors criticized the preliminary policy paper Platform Onderwijs 2032 for not taking sufficient account of findings in psychology and neuroscience.

Bekkering was elected a member of the Royal Netherlands Academy of Arts and Sciences in 2016. He was elected a member of Academia Europaea in 2017.

== Works ==
- Jurjen van der Helden & Harold Bekkering, De lerende mens, 2015, Boom.

== Links ==
- Media related to Harold Bekkering at Wikimedia Commons
