= Thijs Wöltgens =

Dutch politician

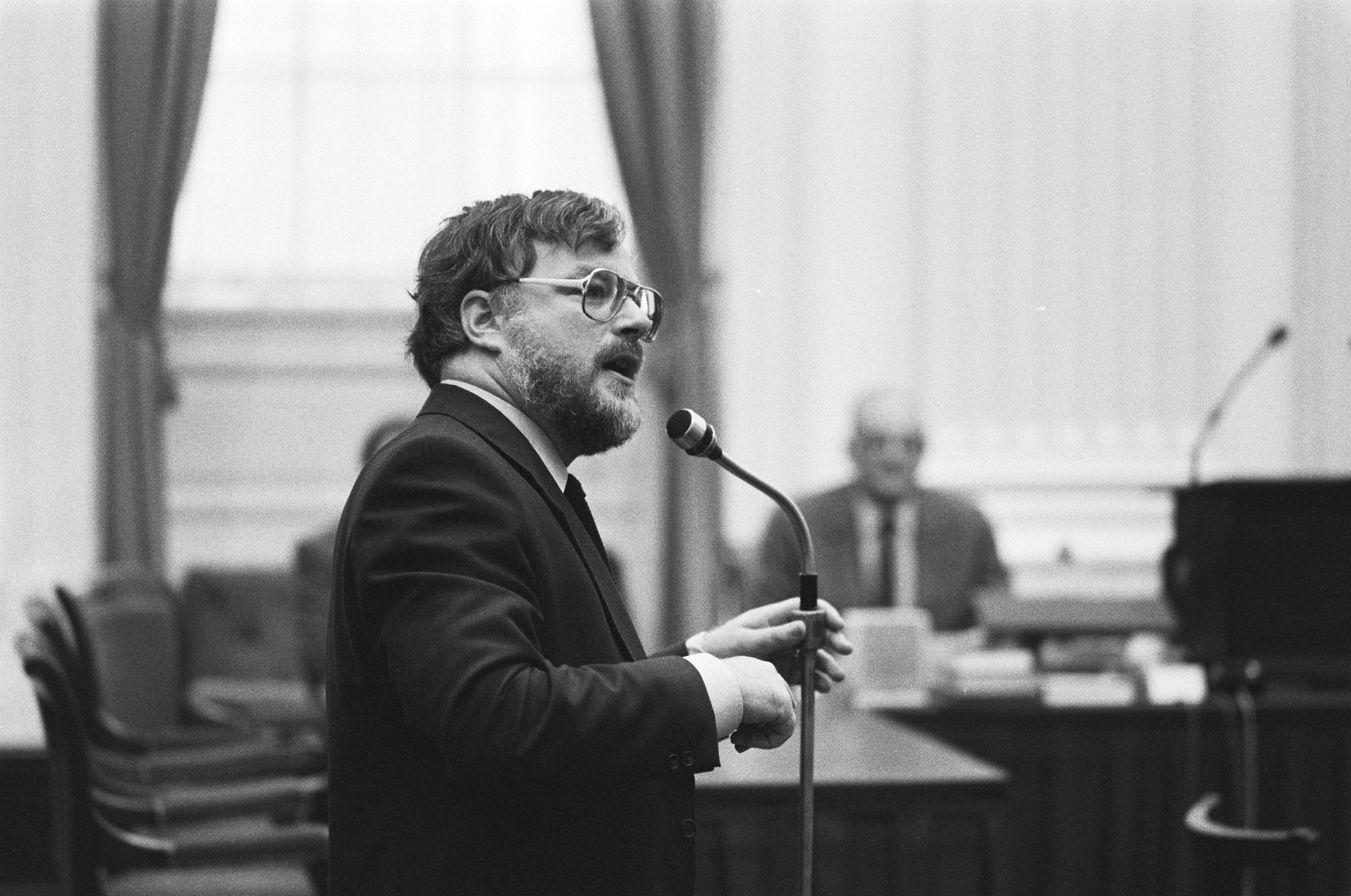
Thijs Wöltgens (1982)

Mathias Andreas Marie (Thijs) Wöltgens (30 November 1943 Kerkrade - 7 May 2008) was a Dutch politician. He served as the mayor of the Kerkrade, a town on the German border in the southeast of the Netherlands, from 1994 until 2000. Wöltgens was also a Senator from 1995 until 2005.

Thijs Wöltgens died in Kerkrade on 7 May 2008, at the age of 64 of a heart attack.

== See also ==
- List of mayors of Kerkrade
