= Roosteren =

Village in Limburg, the Netherlands

- Village
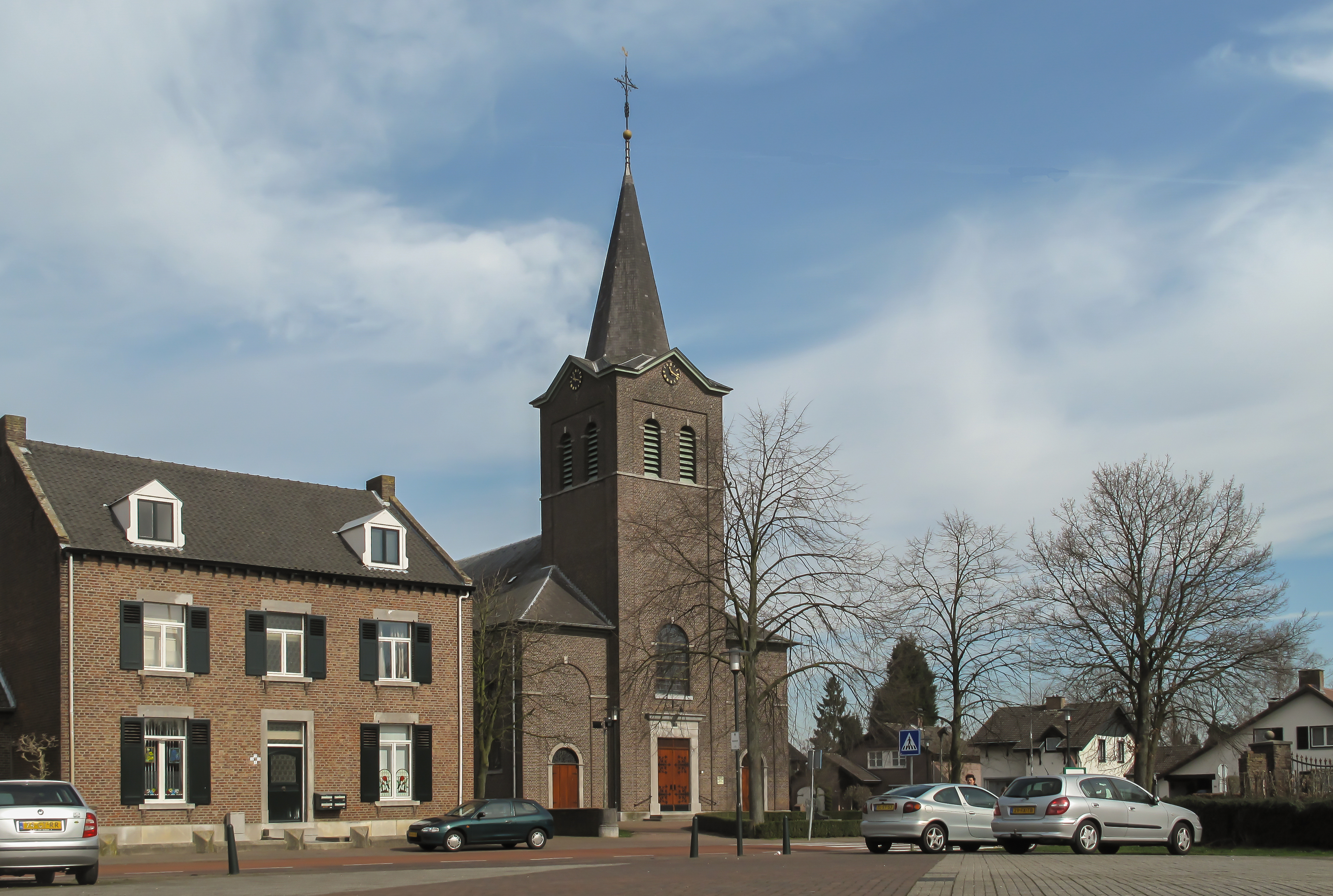
- Roosteren, church in the street

- Location in the Netherlands Location in the province of Limburg in the Netherlands
- Coordinates: 51°05′N 5°49′E
- Country: Netherlands
- Province: Limburg
- Municipality: Echt-Susteren

Area
  - Total: 1.23 km^{2} (0.47 sq mi)
- Elevation: 84 m (276 ft)

Population (2021)
  - Total: 2,370
  - Density: 1,930/km^{2} (4,990/sq mi)
- Time zone: UTC+1 (CET)
  - Summer (DST): UTC+2 (CEST)
- Postal code: 6116
- Dialing code: 046
- Major roads: A2, N296

Roosteren (Limburgish: Roostere) is a village in the Dutch province of Limburg. It is located in the municipality of Echt-Susteren.

The village was first mentioned in 1201 as Rustern. The etymology is unclear. Roosteren developed in the Middle Ages as a linear settlement. In the 13th century, it became part of the Duchy of Guelders. The centre moved to the hamlet Scheiereynde where a church was built.

The St Jacobus de Meerdere Church is a three-aisled neoclassic church which was in 1843. It was damaged during World War II and restored in 1946. Eyckholt Castle is a late-16th century estate. A tower was added in the 19th century. Ter Borch Castle (also Roosterborch) was built around 1880 and the location of a 15th century which was demolished in 1632.

Roosteren was home to 746 people in 1840. It was a separate municipality until 1982, when it was merged with Susteren. The municipality also covered the hamlets of Visserweert, Kokkelert, and Oud-Roosteren. In 2003, it was merged into Echt-Susteren.

== Gallery ==
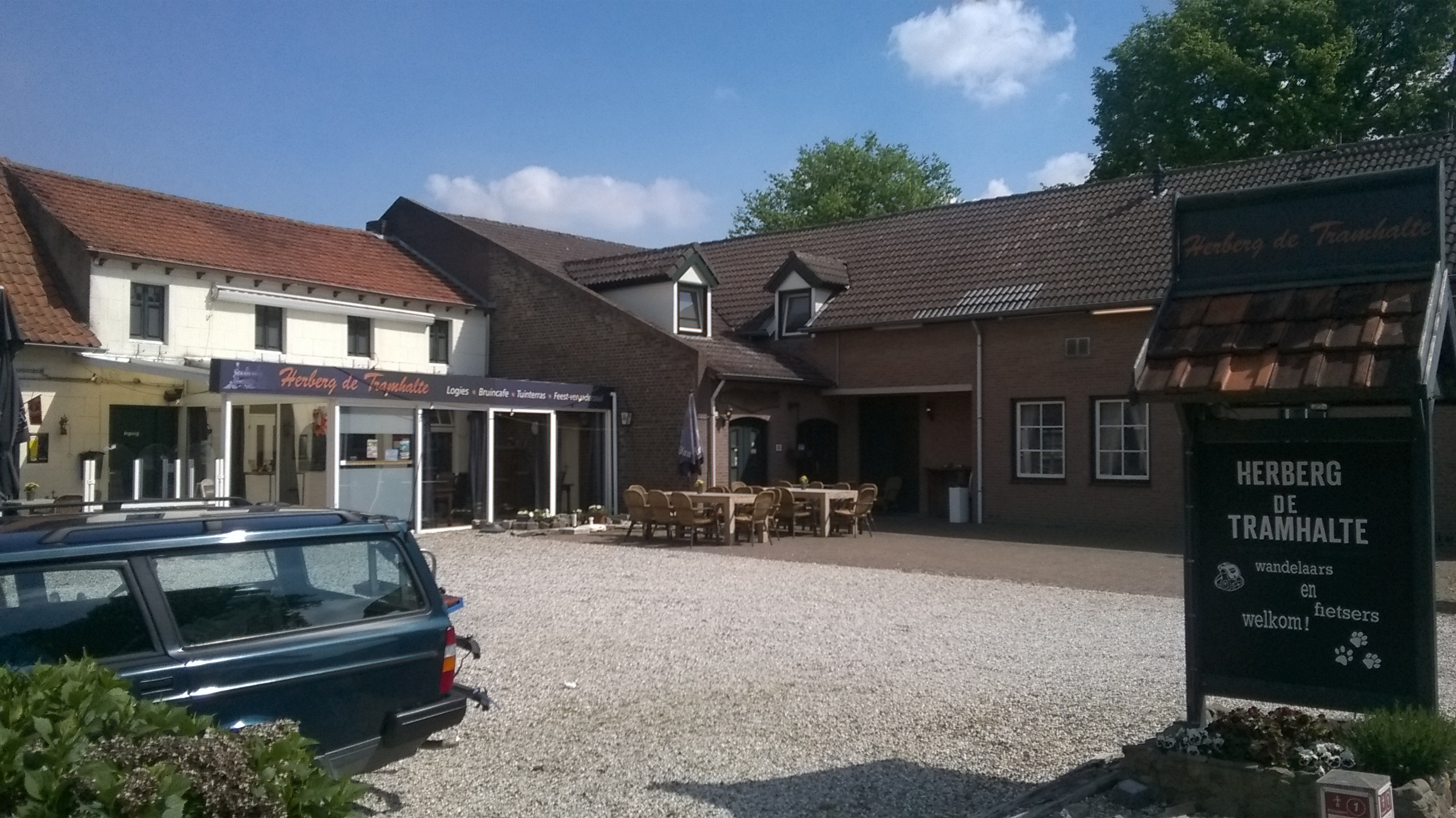
Inn De Tramhalte

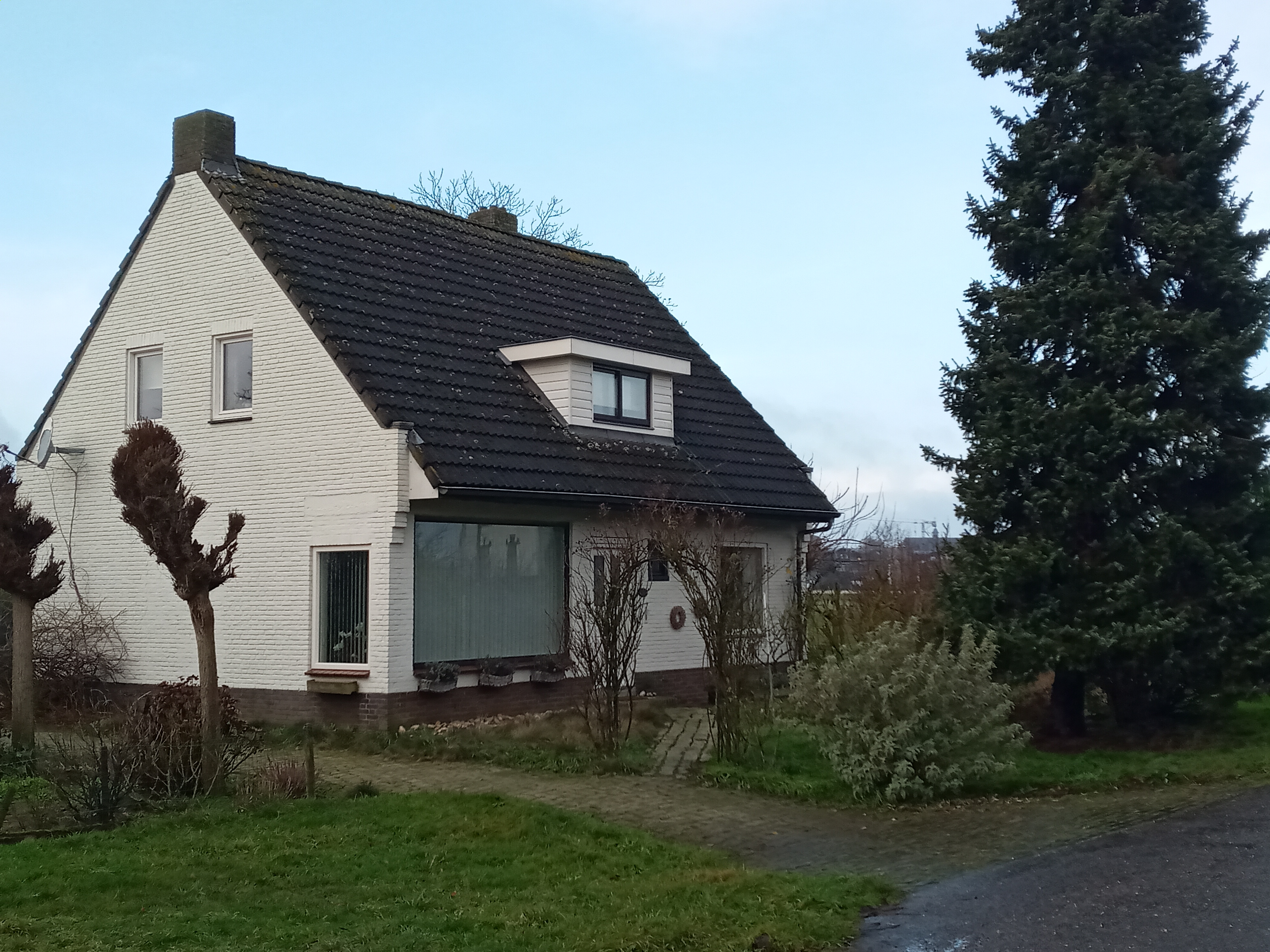
House in Roosteren

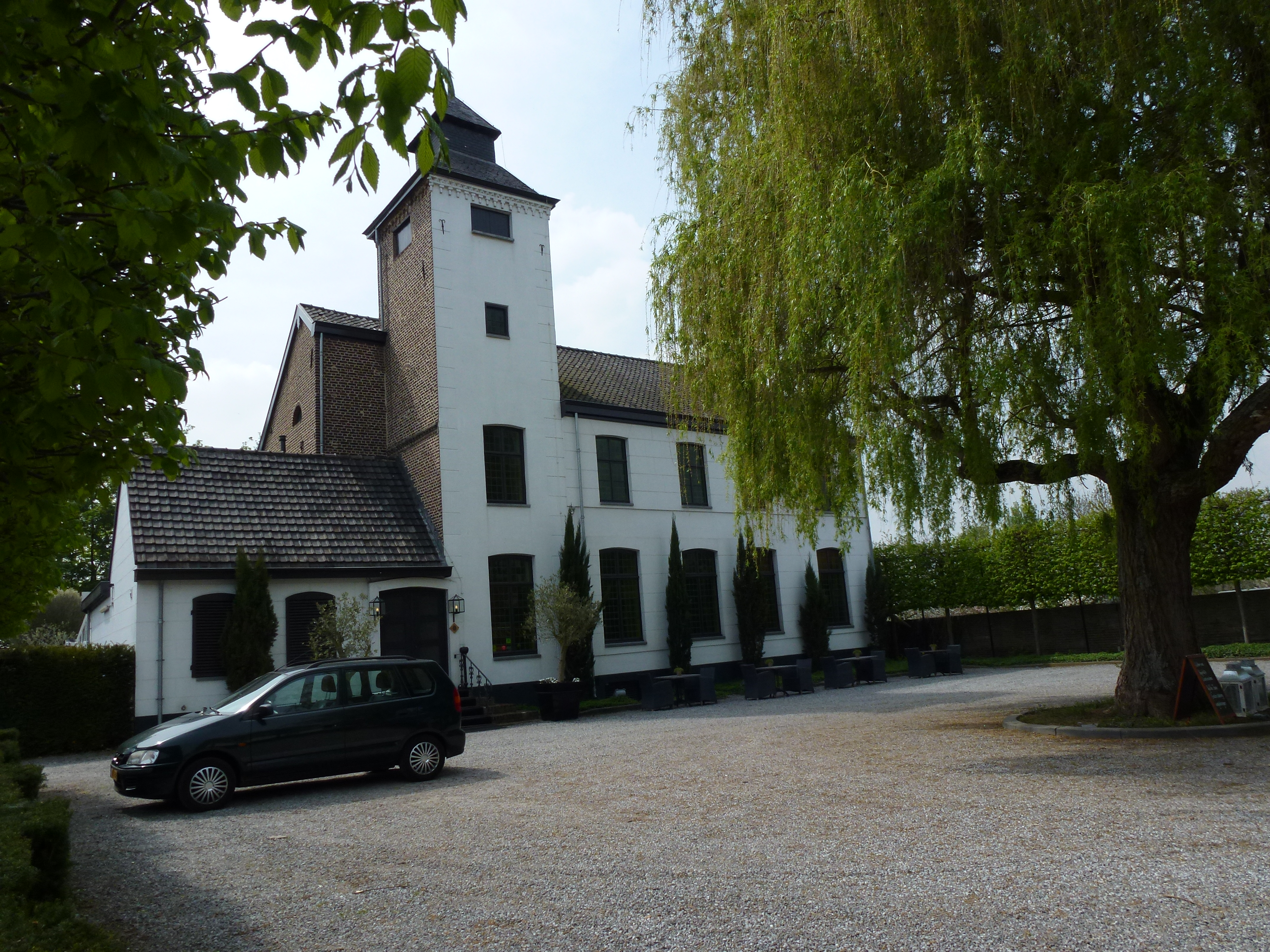
Eyckholt Castle

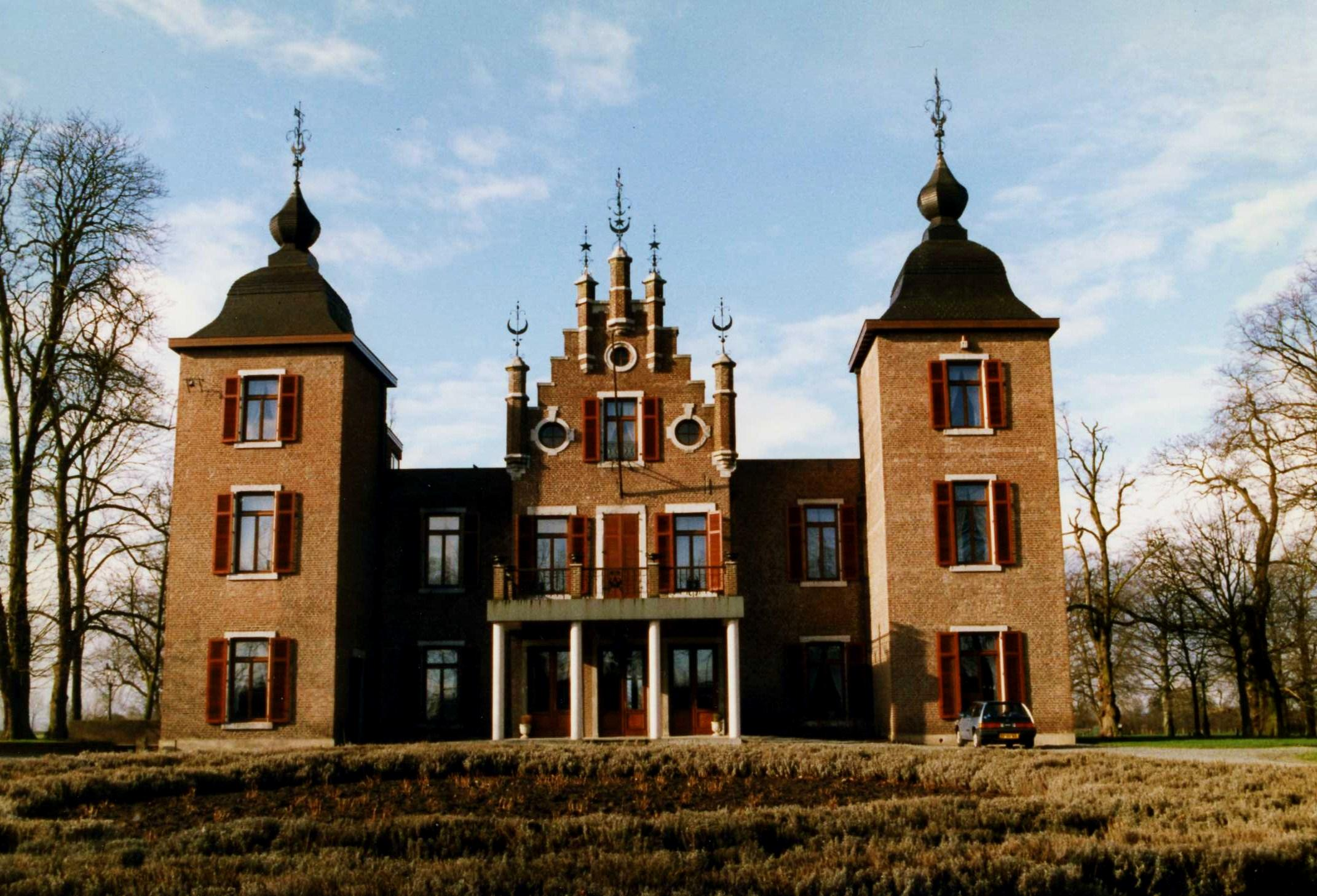
Ter Borgh Castle

== Notable people ==
- Harry Bekkering, cultural scientist (born 1944)
- Jerome Lambrechts, politician (1839–1896)
- Paul Peters, politician (born 1942)
- Mathieu Pustjens, racing cyclist (born 1948)
- Sjra Schoffelen, sculptor (born 1937)
