= Belfeld =

Coordinates: 51°19′N 6°7′E

- Flag Coat of arms

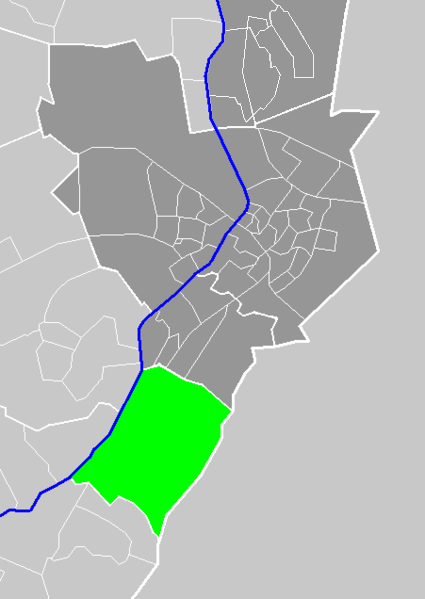
- Country: Netherlands
- Province: Limburg
- Municipality: Venlo

Area
  - Total: 1,388 ha (3,430 acres)

Population (2006)
  - Total: ca. 5.450
- Postal code: 5950-5951
- Major roads: A73

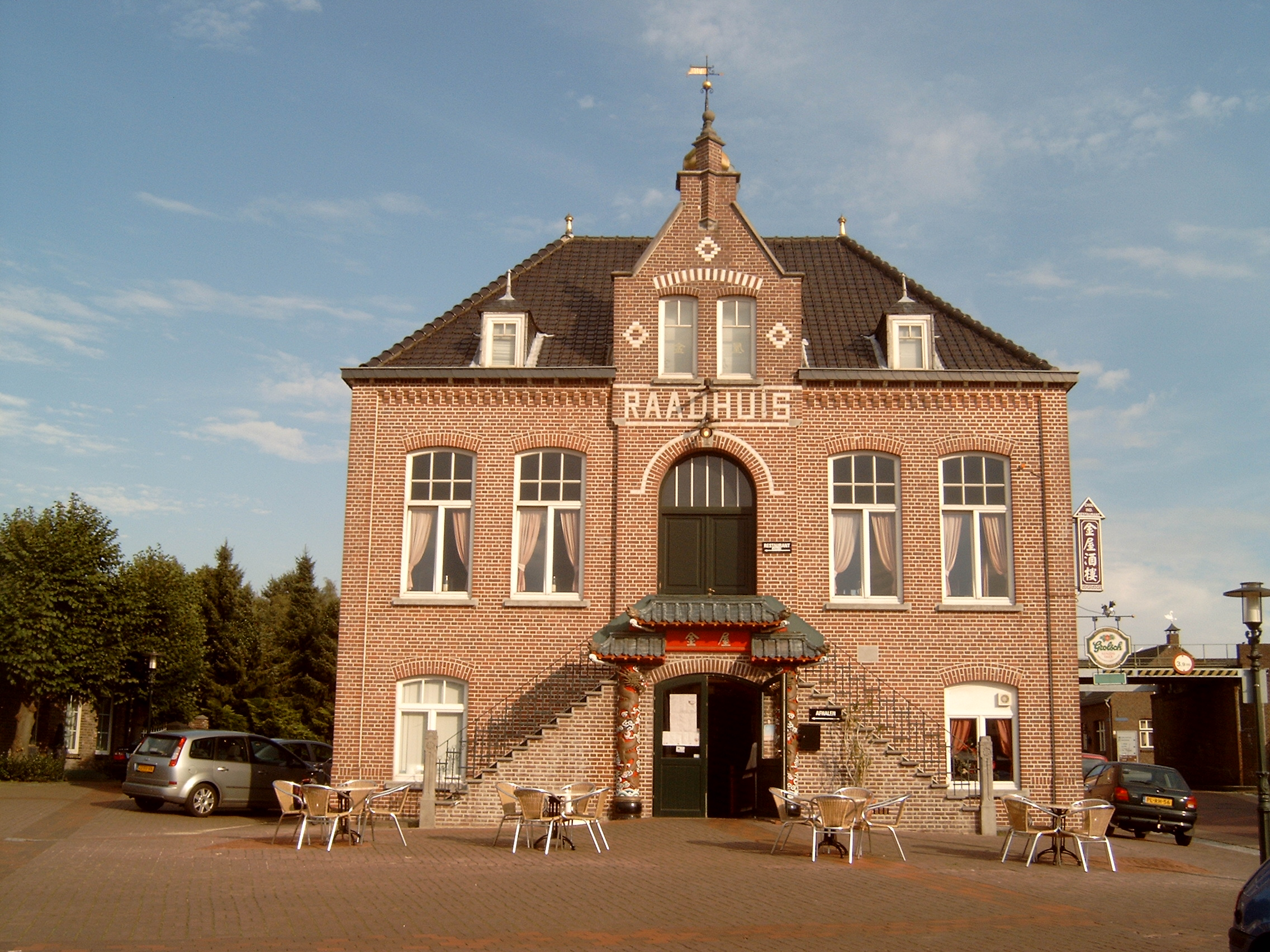
Former town hall

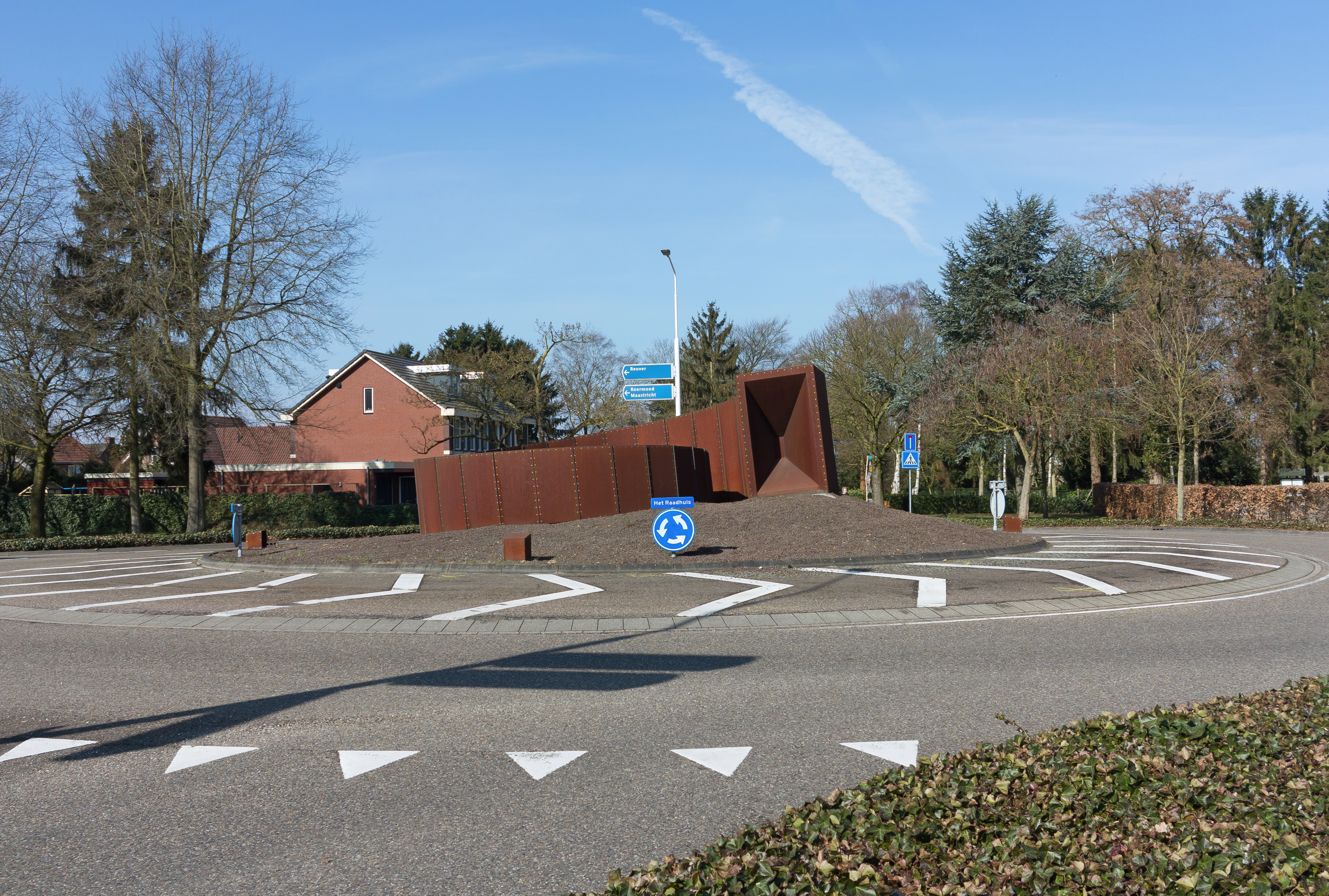
Sculpture at the roudabout

Belfeld (Limburgish: Belvend) is a village in the Dutch province of Limburg. It is a part of the municipality of Venlo, and lies about 8 km southwest of the city center of Venlo, between the river Meuse and the border with Germany.

In 2001, Belfeld had 4856 inhabitants. The built-up area of the town was 1.59 km², and contained 1937 residences.

In 2001 Belfeld was merged into the municipality of Venlo.
