= Eygelshoven =

Eygelshoven Egelze (Limburgish)
- Neighbourhood and former village
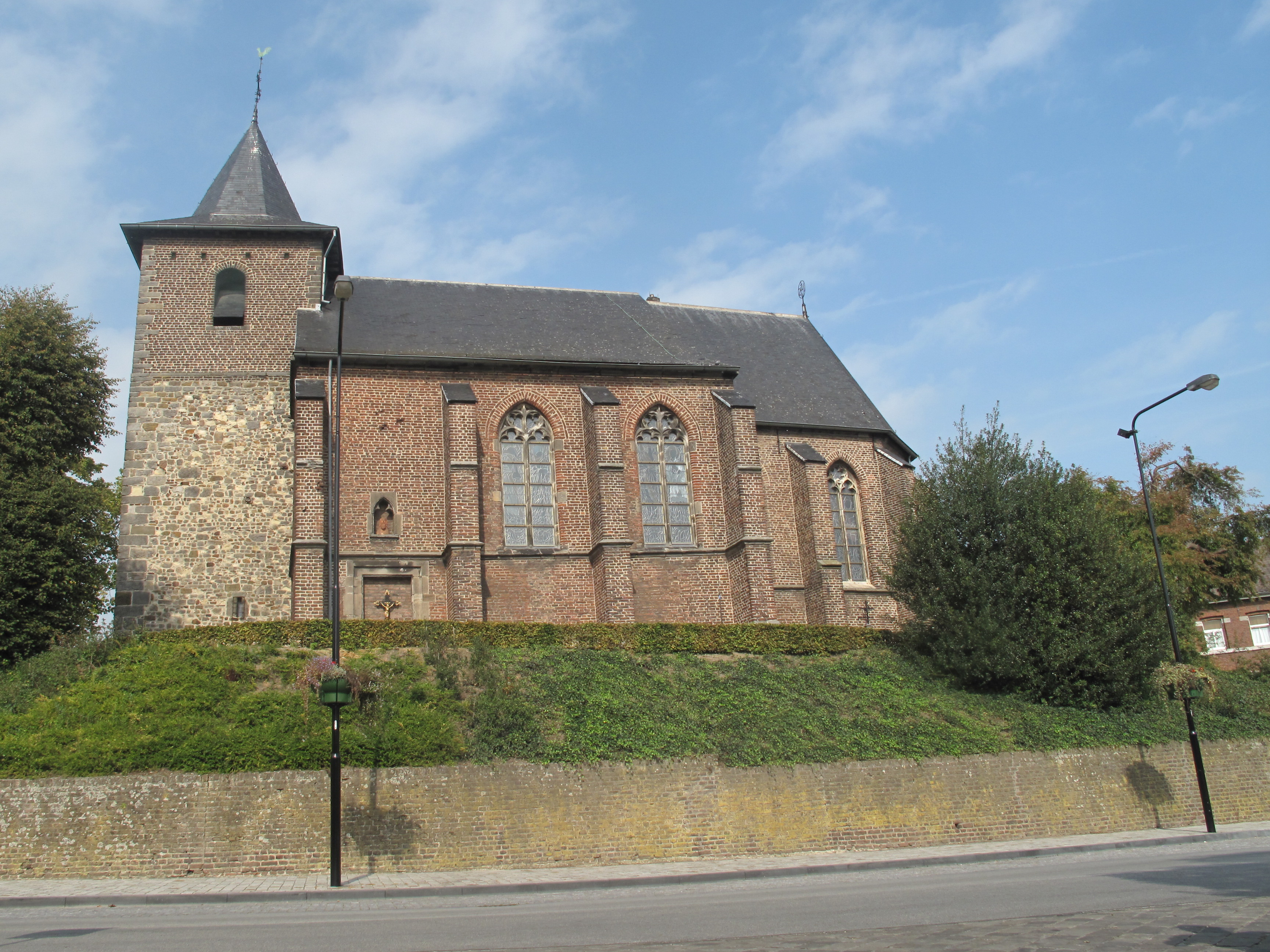
- The little church of Eygelshoven

- Coat of arms

- Location in the Netherlands Location in the province of Limburg in the Netherlands
- Coordinates: 50°54′N 6°3′E
- Country: Netherlands
- Province: Limburg
- Municipality: Kerkrade

Area
  - Total: 1.24 km^{2} (0.48 sq mi)
- Elevation: 104 m (341 ft)

Population (2021)
  - Total: 2,140
  - Density: 1,730/km^{2} (4,470/sq mi)
- Time zone: UTC+1 (CET)
  - Summer (DST): UTC+2 (CEST)
- Postal code: 6471
- Dialing code: 045

Eygelshoven (Dutch pronunciation: [ˈɛiɣəlsɦoːvə(n)], Limburgish: Egelze [ˈeːɣəlzə], Ripuarian: Ejelze [ˈeːjəlzə]) is a village, since 1982 part of the town of Kerkrade, in the southeast of the Netherlands, close to the German and Belgian borders.

It has two former coal mines, Laura and Julia, which were named after the wives of the two owners. Both pits closed in 1974. The local soccer club is also named after the former coal mines.

Eygelshoven has a small former church from the sixteenth century, which stands on top of a hill. In 1922, another church was built. Architect Alphons Boosten designed the new church. Plans to demolish the old church were abandoned in favour of a new use as a chapel and because of its historical worth.

A third Roman Catholic church was built in 1957, the Pastoor van Arskerk, which was torn down in 1994 when it became redundant.

The old mining village of Eygelshoven was a separate municipality until 1982, when after more than eight centuries it was merged with Kerkrade.

The dialect spoken in Eygelshoven is not the Ripuarian Kerkrade dialect, but a local East Limburgish variety called Egelzer plat. One of the biggest differences between the two is the pronunciation of the letter ⟨g⟩; in Eygelshoven, it is pronounced as a voiced velar fricative, as in southern Standard Dutch, whereas in Kerkrade it is pronounced as a palatal approximant (as in Colognian), except after back vowels.

== Transportation ==
- Eygelshoven railway station
- Eygelshoven Markt railway station

== Gallery ==
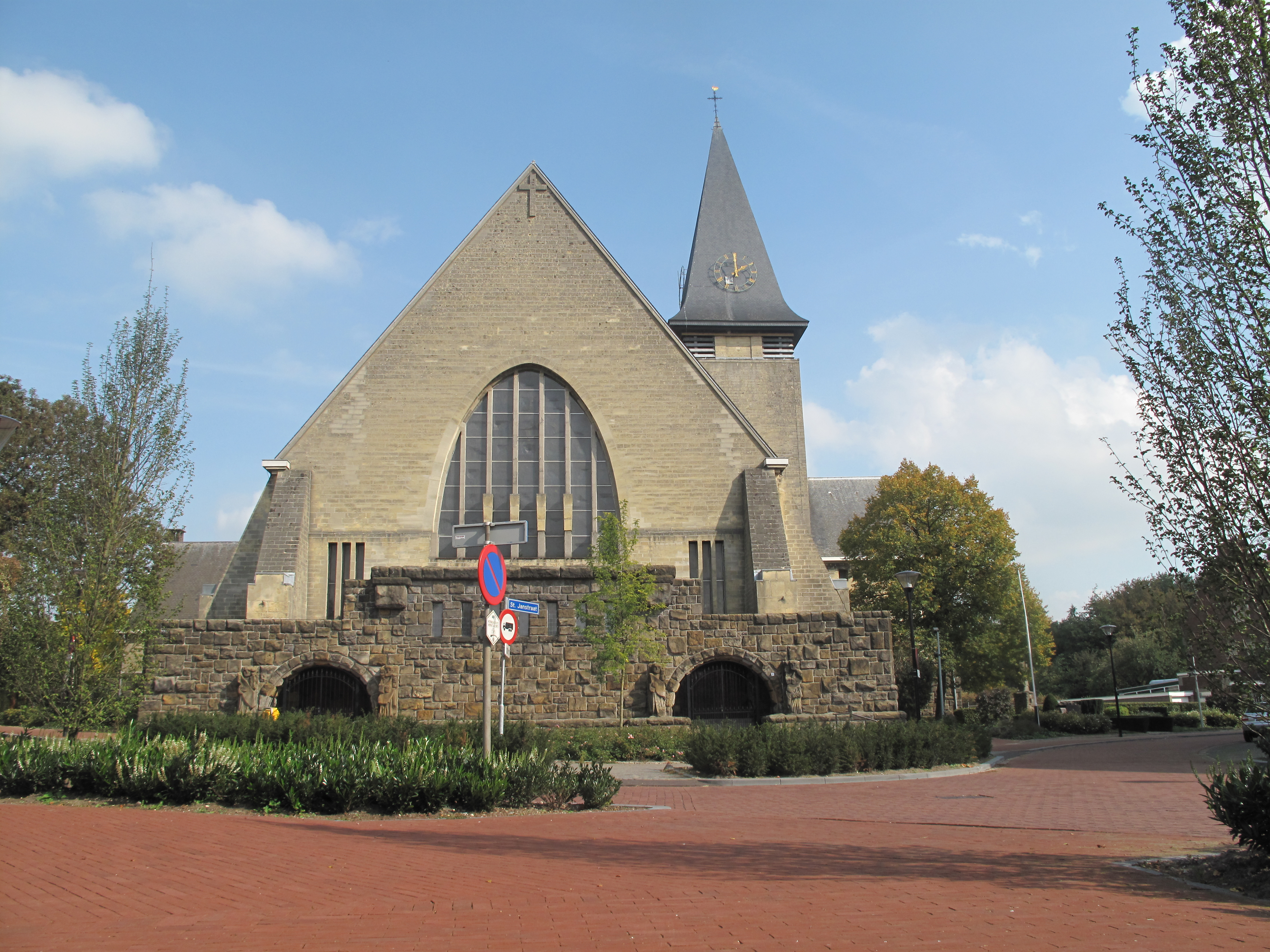
Eygelshoven, church

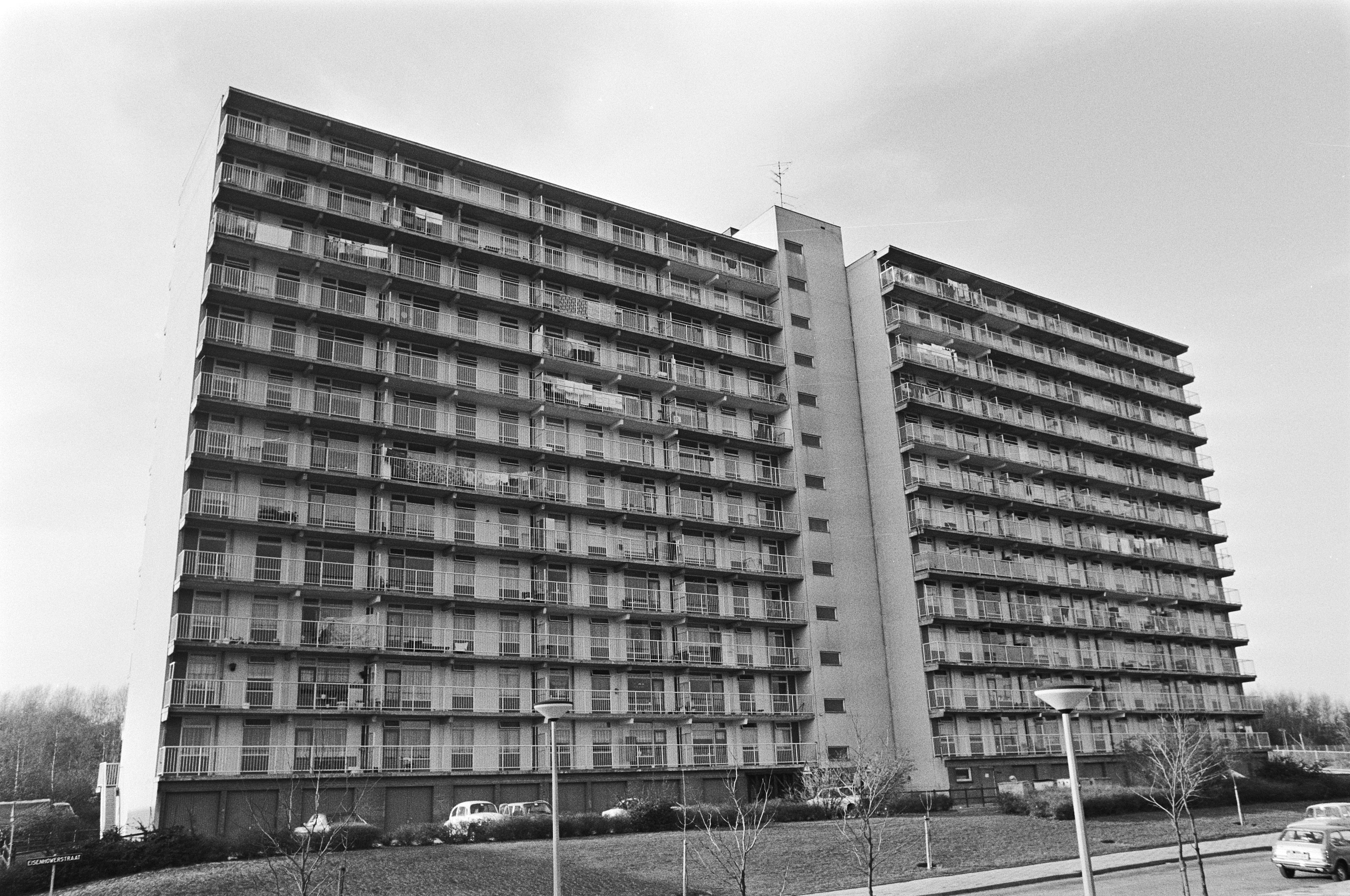
Apartment building which was later demolished (1976)

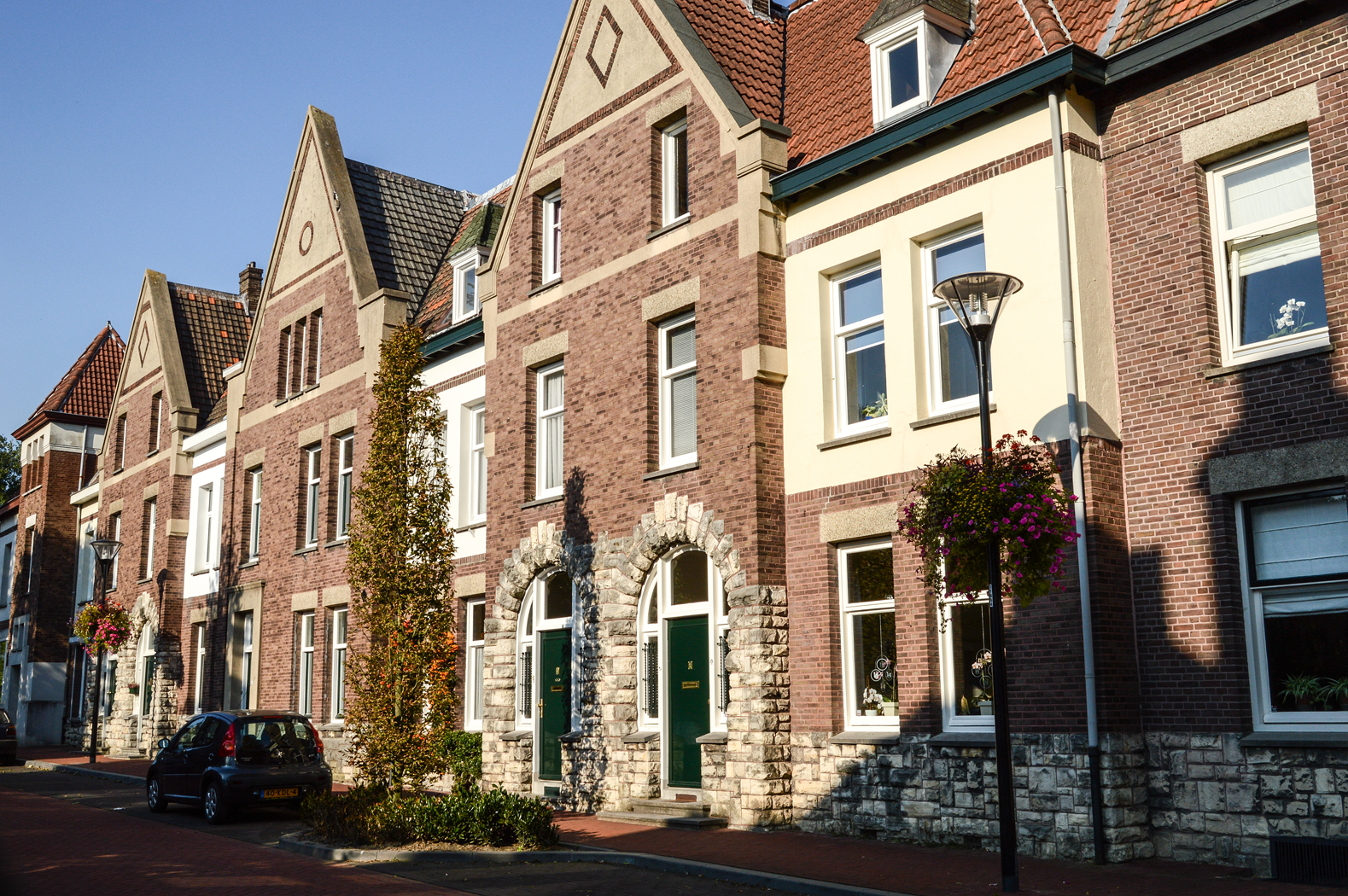
Houses in Eygelshoven

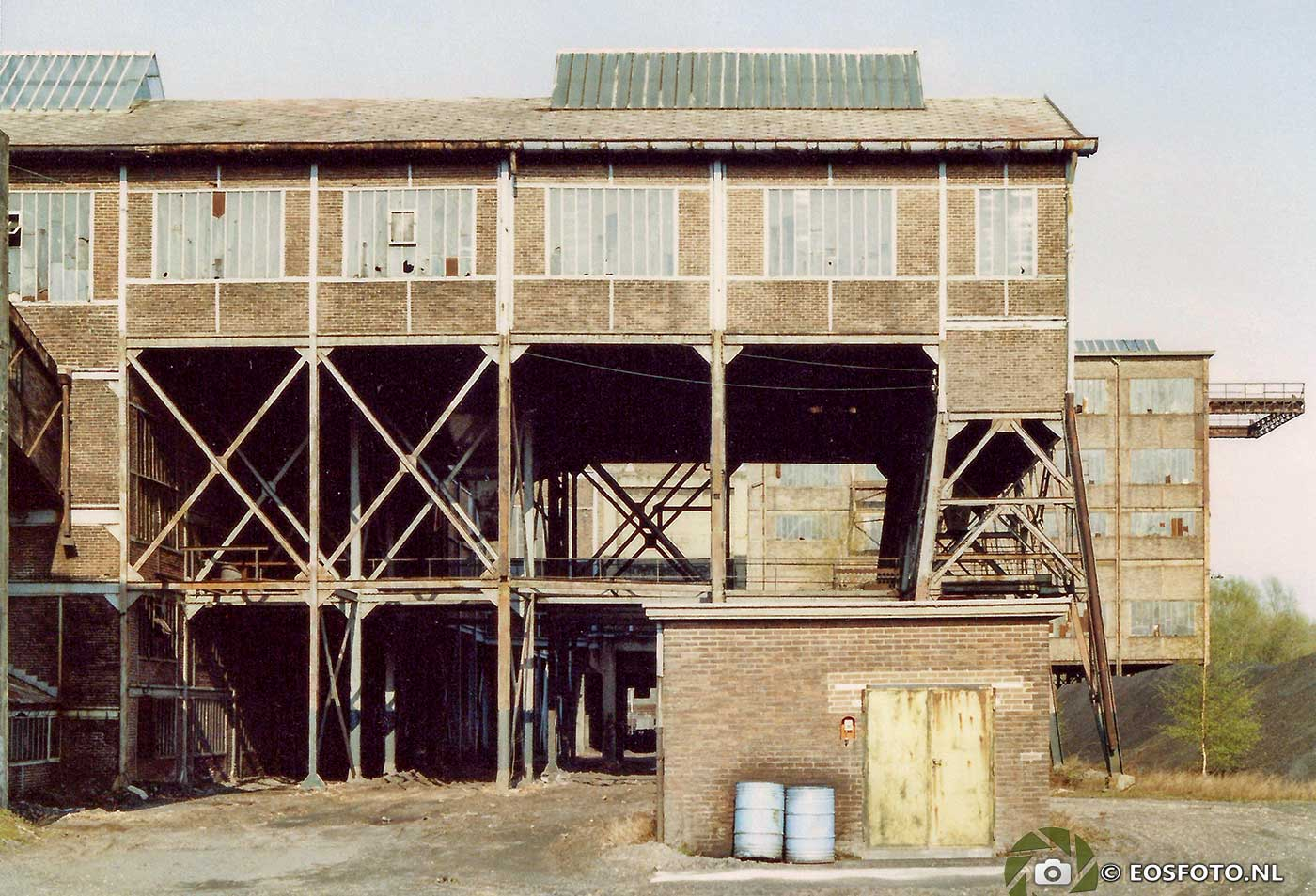
Former mine Julia

== See also ==
- List of mayors of Eygelshoven
