= Kerkrade =

Kerkrade Kirchroa (Ripuarian)
- Municipality
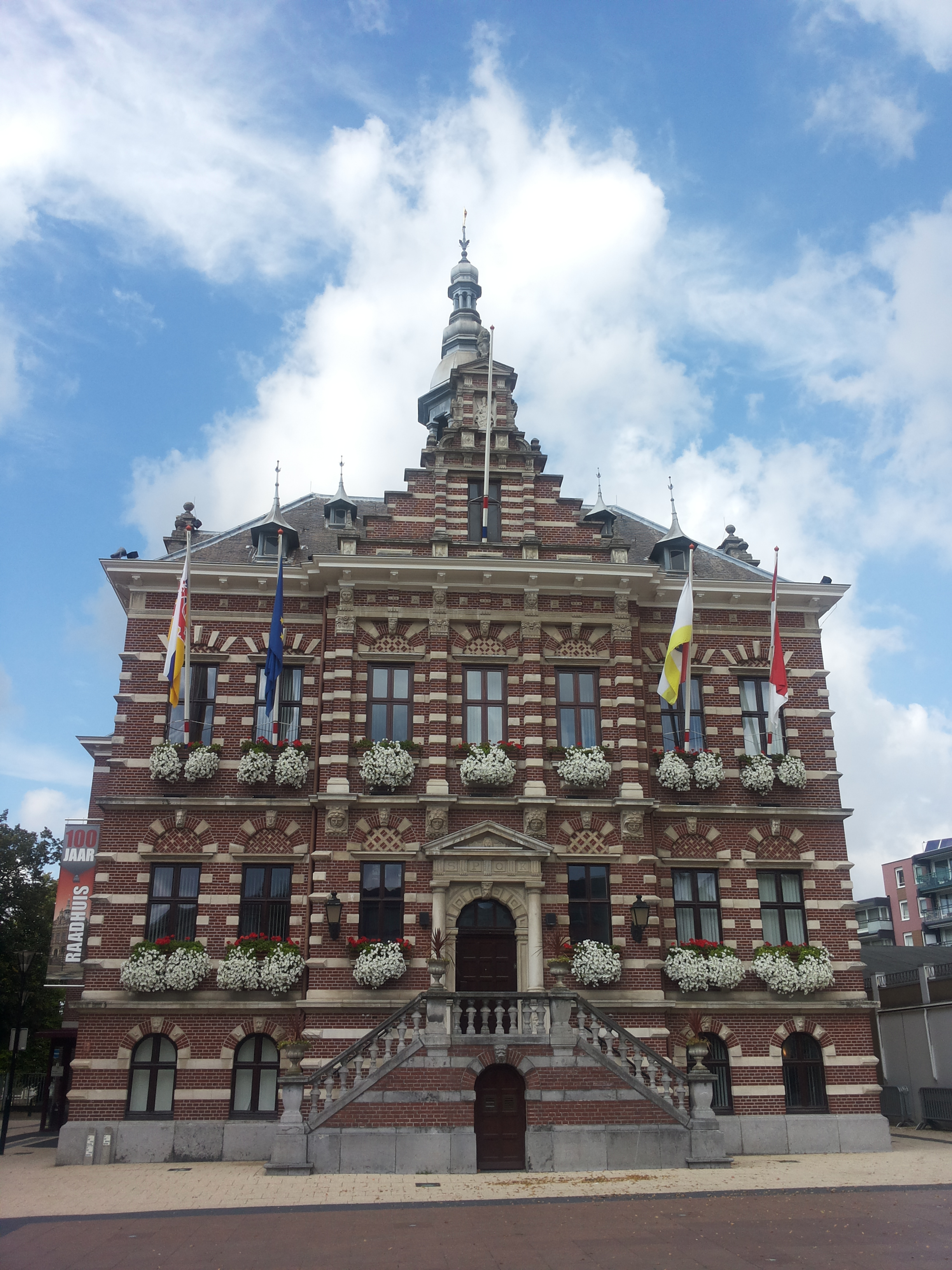
- Kerkrade city hall

- Flag Coat of arms

- Location in Limburg
- Coordinates: 50°52′N 6°4′E
- Country: Netherlands
- Province: Limburg

Government
  - Body: Municipal council
  - Mayor: Petra Dassen-Housen (CDA)

Area
  - Total: 22.15 km^{2} (8.55 sq mi)
  - Land: 21.91 km^{2} (8.46 sq mi)
  - Water: 0.24 km^{2} (0.093 sq mi)
- Elevation: 155 m (509 ft)

Population (January 2021)
  - Total: 45,442
  - Density: 2,074/km^{2} (5,370/sq mi)
- Demonym: Kerkradenaar
- Time zone: UTC+1 (CET)
  - Summer (DST): UTC+2 (CEST)
- Postcode: 6460–6471
- Area code: 045
- Website: www.kerkrade.nl

Kerkrade (Dutch pronunciation: [ˈkɛrkˌraːdə]; Ripuarian: Kirchroa; Limburgish: Kirkraoj; German: Kerkrade or Kirchrath) is a town and a municipality in the southeast of Limburg, the southernmost province of the Netherlands. It forms part of the Parkstad Limburg agglomeration.

Kerkrade is the western half of a divided city; until 1795 the city was part of the Austrian Netherlands and from 1795 to 1815 it was part of the French Empire. In 1815, the Congress of Vienna created the current Dutch-German border and divided the town into the Dutch Kerkrade and the Prussian (German) Herzogenrath. This means that the eastern end of Kerkrade marks the international border.

The two towns, including outlying suburban settlements, have a population approaching 100,000, of which nearly 47,000 are in Kerkrade.

== History ==
The history of Kerkrade is closely linked with that of the adjacent town of Herzogenrath, just across the German border. Herzogenrath began as a settlement, called Rode, near the river Worm (or Wurm in German) in the 11th century. In 1104 Augustinian monks founded an abbey, called Kloosterrade, to the west of this settlement.

It was called 's-Hertogenrode or 's-Hertogenrade (Dutch: the Duke's Rode) after the duchy of Brabant took control over the region; in French it was called Rolduc (Rode-le-duc). As is the case for many parts of the Southern Netherlands, the place changed hands several times in the last few centuries. It was under Spanish control from 1661, Austrian between 1713 and 1785 and French between 1795 and 1813. In 1815, when the kingdom of the Netherlands was formed (see Vienna Congress), the border was drawn through Herzogenrath, the western part being Kerkrade.

In the 18th century the monks of Rolduc began small-scale coal mines. More modern exploitation by others started in 1860, causing Kerkrade to grow significantly, especially as a consequence of the permanent settlement of mainly Southern-European miners in this Northern-European place. When the Willem Sophia mine was opened around 1900, the town grew even more rapidly, absorbing old villages like Chèvremont. In the decades following 1960, all the mines in Limburg were closed.

One of the oldest buildings in the municipality is Erenstein, a castle the origins of which lie in the 14th century.

== The border along Nieuwstraat/Neustraße ==
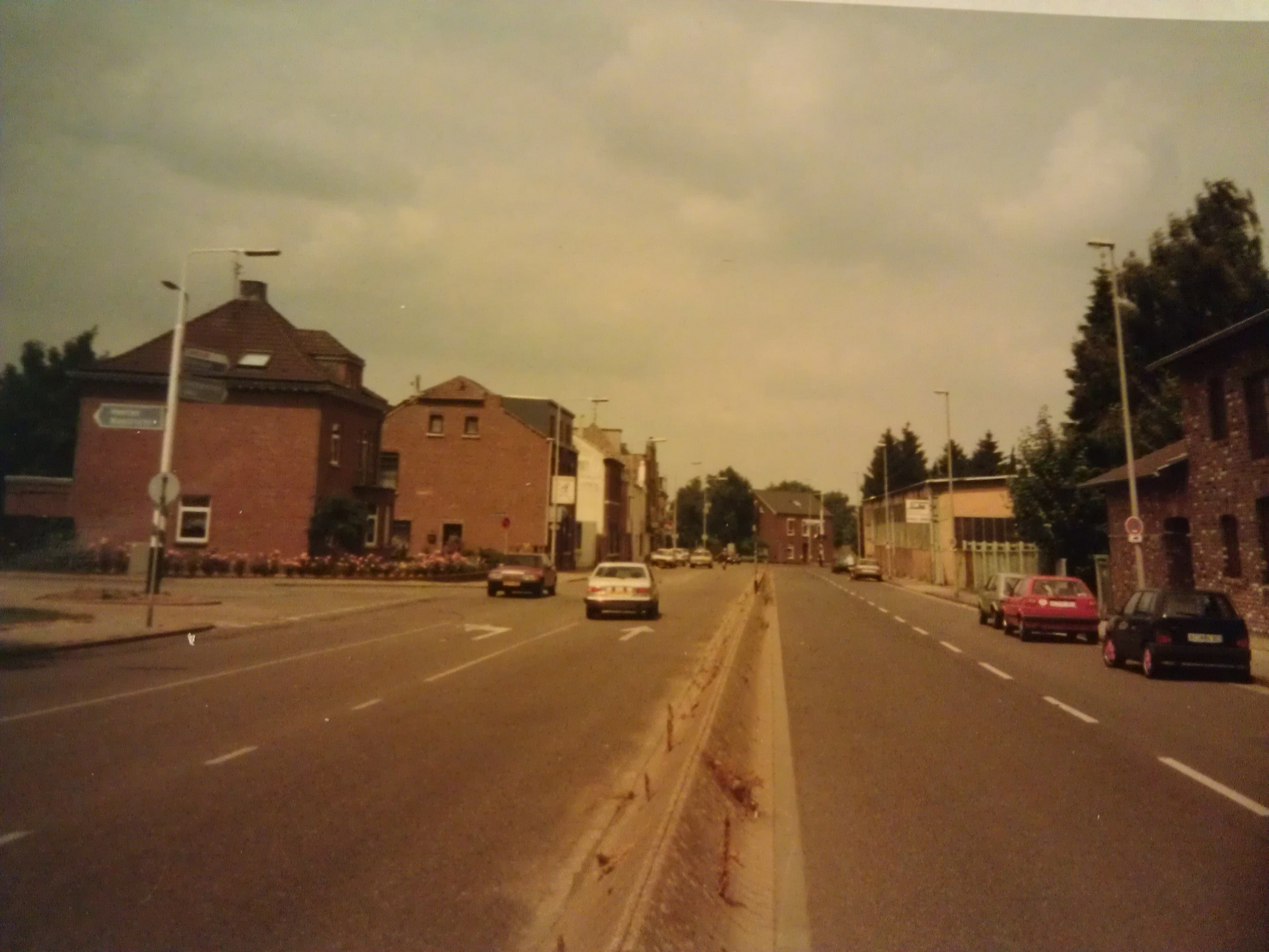
Nieuwstraat/Neustraße in 1993. At left is the Dutch side, at right the German side.

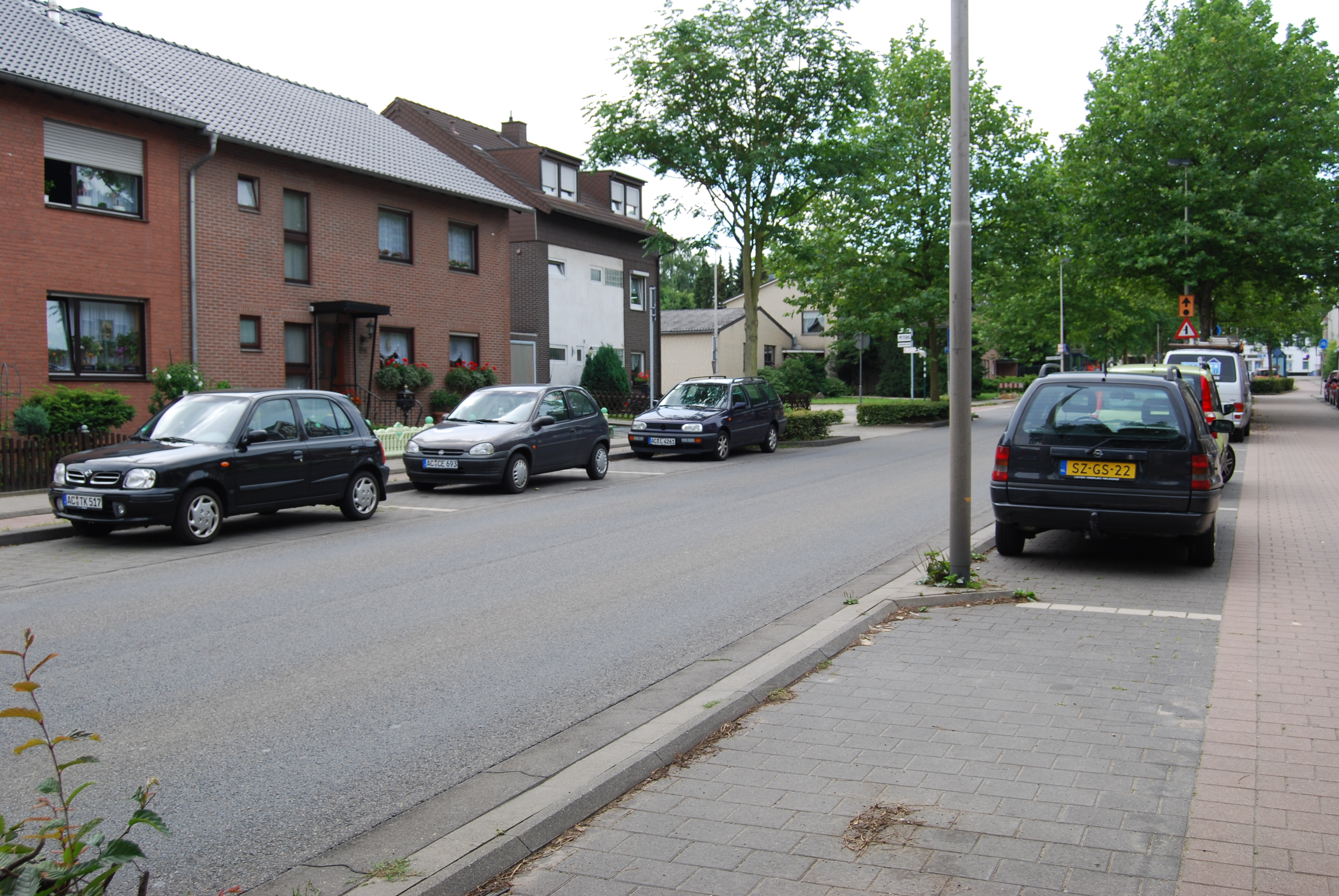
Nieuwstraat/Neustraße in 2009

One part of the border between the Netherlands and Germany runs along the middle of the street Nieuwstraat/Neustraße. The border was heavily fortified by the Germans during World War I and World War II, but because of relatively unrestricted cross-border travel within the European Union, following World War II marked only with a low wall, about 30 cm (one foot) high, running along the length of the street (borders were at that time designed to be unpassable by vehicles, except at border crossing, but no fence for pedestrians). There was a separate 2-way road on each side, and cars had to pass through the official crossing points, but pedestrians could readily step over the wall (although there were signs informing of the border). In 1995, the wall was removed completely as part of the new Schengen Area agreement. Nieuwstraat/Neustraße is now a single two-way road, with the extra space now occupied with trees and bicycle lanes. The border is unmarked, and is crossed even when going round a roundabout or overtaking a vehicle.

The two towns now share some of their public services, and promote themselves as a binational "City of Eurode" for economic development purposes. They share a binational office complex which uses the Eurode name, and is built so that the border passes directly through the centre of the building's main lobby, with one wing of the building in Kerkrade and the other in Herzogenrath.

== Population centres ==
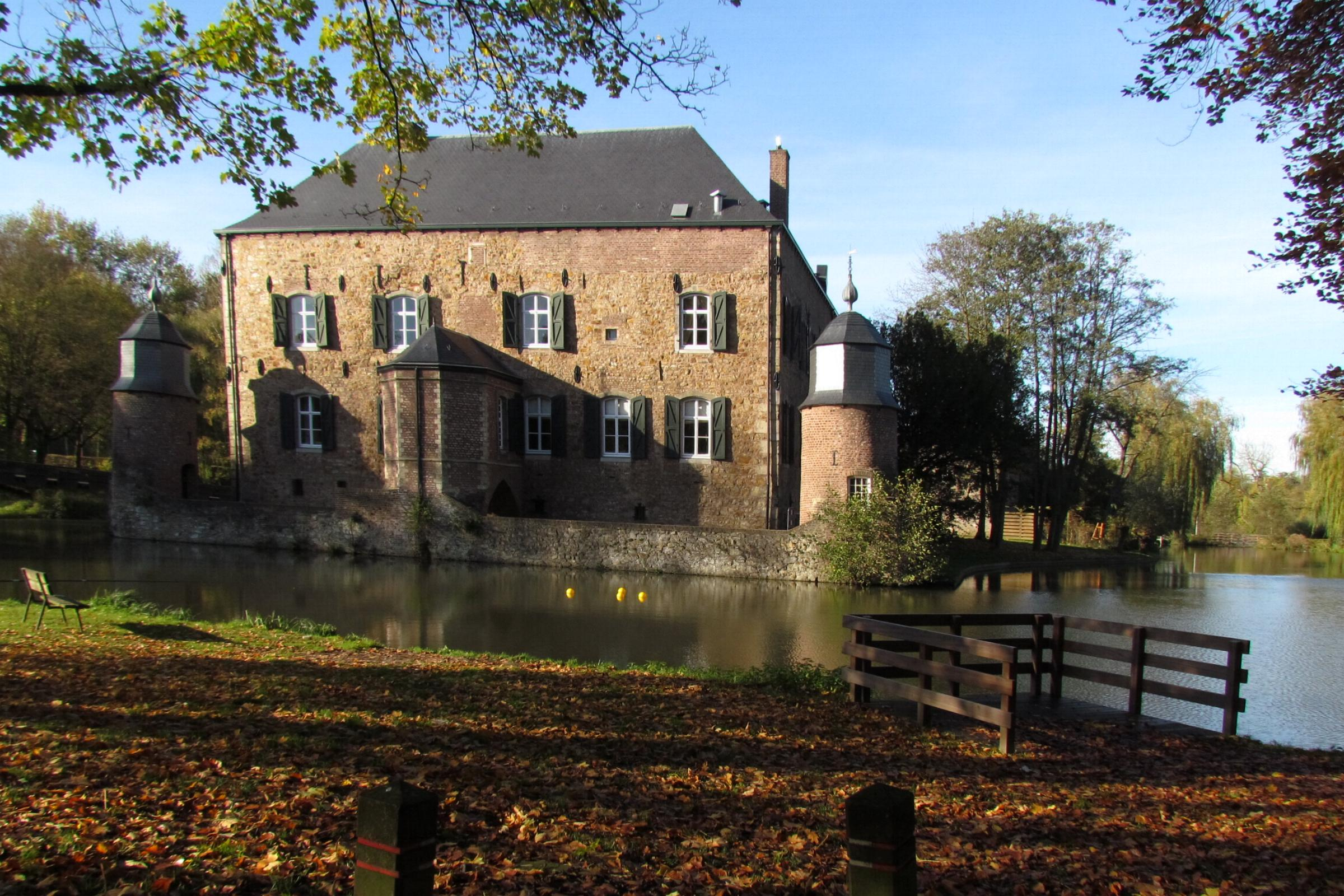
Erenstein castle

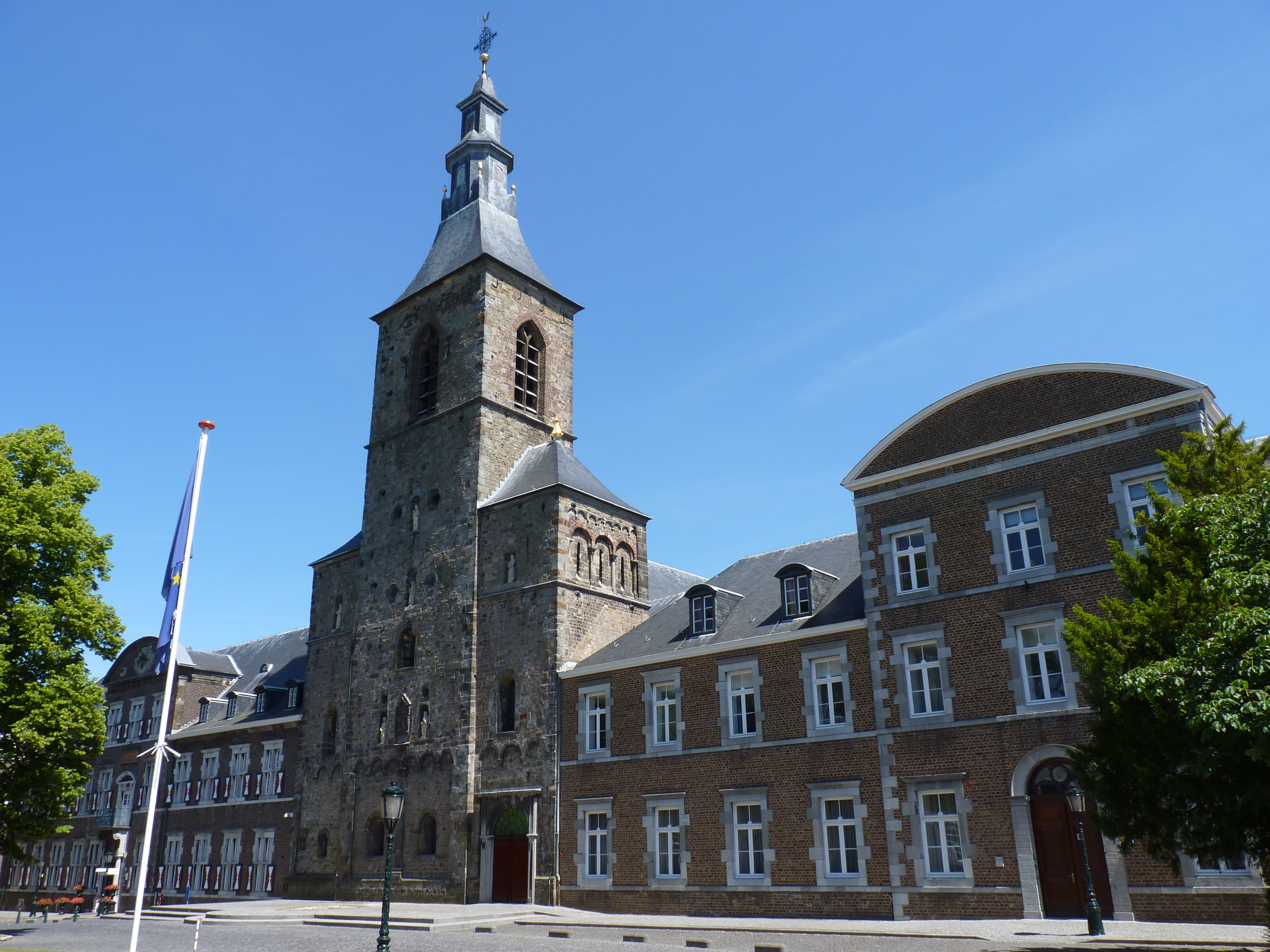
Rolduc Abbey

Kerkrade's outlying neighborhoods and housing developments include:

- Bleijerheide
- Chevremont
- Eygelshoven
- Gracht (Kerkrade)
- Haanrade
- Holz
- Hopel
- Kaalheide
- Mucherveld
- Nulland
- Rolduc
- Rolduckerveld
- Spekholzerheide
- Terwinselen

== Music ==
Every fourth year the World Music Contest, a competition for amateur, professional, and military bands, is held in Kerkrade. Also, for the last three years, the Drum Corps Europe championships have been held here.

== Transportation ==
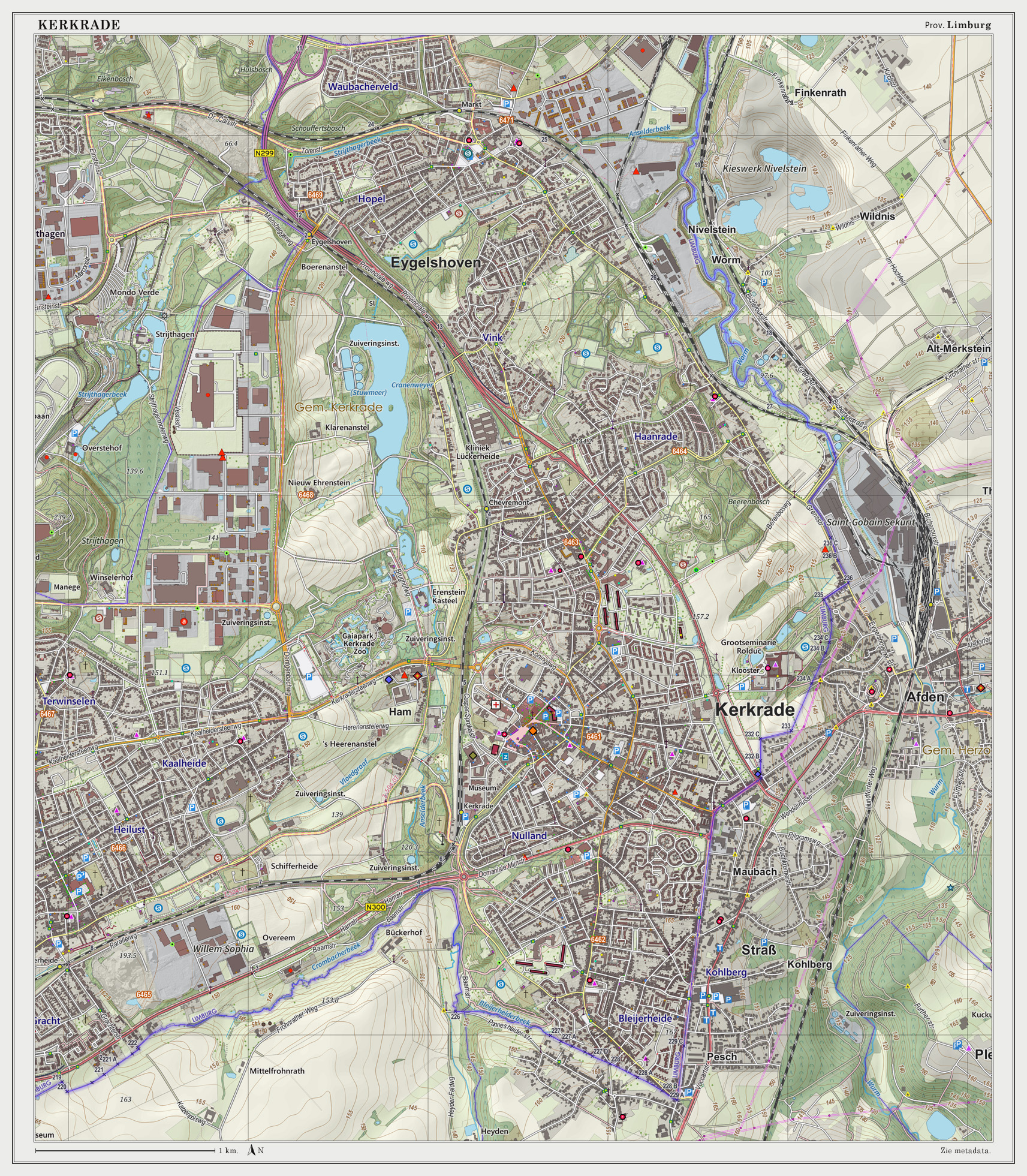
Dutch Topographic map of Kerkrade (city), March 2014; (readable after three clicks)

Kerkrade has 4 railway stations:

- Kerkrade Centrum
- Chevremont
- Eygelshoven
- Eygelshoven Markt

Another station, Kerkrade West or Spekholzerheide, closed for public rail in 1988, and since 1992 it is in use by a museum-railway company, ZLSM.

== Reservoir ==
The building of a dam in the Anstel, a brook flowing west of Kerkrade, has led to the formation of a reservoir with an area of about 20 ha (50 acres). This and its surroundings are very rich in flora and fauna. It is the only reservoir in the Netherlands.

== Sports ==
- Roda JC (soccer)
- Powerarea (racing kartcircuit)

== Notable people ==
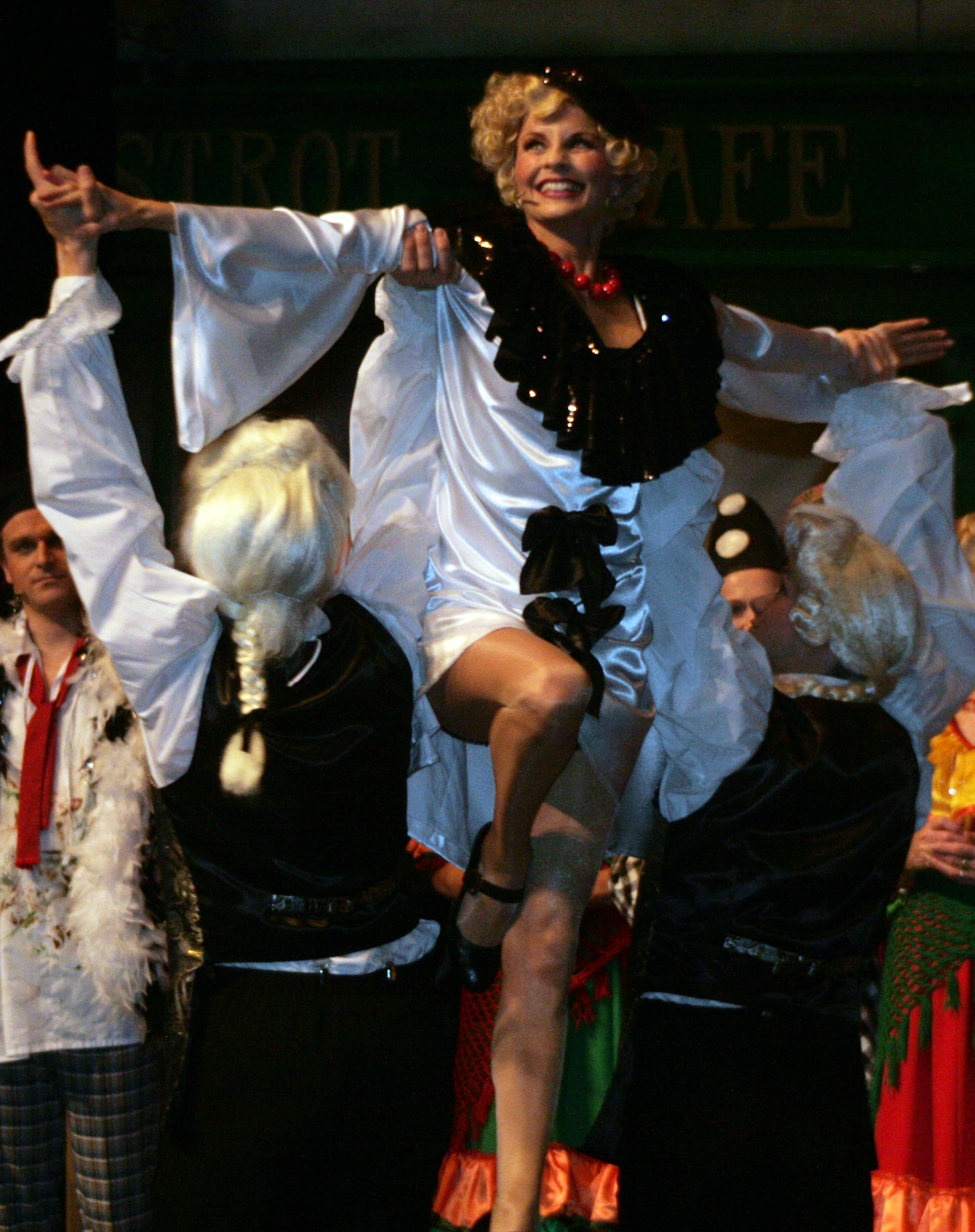
Janine Kitzen, 2013

- Gabriël Grupello (1644–1730) a sculptor who produced religious and mythological sculptures, portraits and public sculptures
- Jozef Weidmann (1899–1962) a Dutch-Surinamese Catholic priest, politician and union leader
- Louk Hulsman (1923–2009) a Dutch legal scientist and criminologist
- Frans Wiertz (born 1942) a prelate of the Roman Catholic Church, Bishop of Roermond 1993-2017
- Thijs Wöltgens (1943-2008) a Dutch politician, Mayor of Kerkrade 1994-2000
- Gerd Leers (born 1951) a Dutch politician, Minister for immigration, Mayor of Maastricht 2002-2010
- Heintje Simons (born 1955) a Dutch schlager singer and actor
- Werner Buck (1925-2010), Dutch politician
- Yvonne Timmerman-Buck (born 1956) a Dutch politician and jurist, President of the Senate 2003-2009
- Hubertus van Megen (born 1961) a prelate of the Catholic Church, diplomat in the Holy See
- Janine Kitzen (born 1978) a soprano singer in opera and musical theatre
- Emma Kok (born 2008) a singer and winner of The Voice Kids in 2021

=== Sport ===
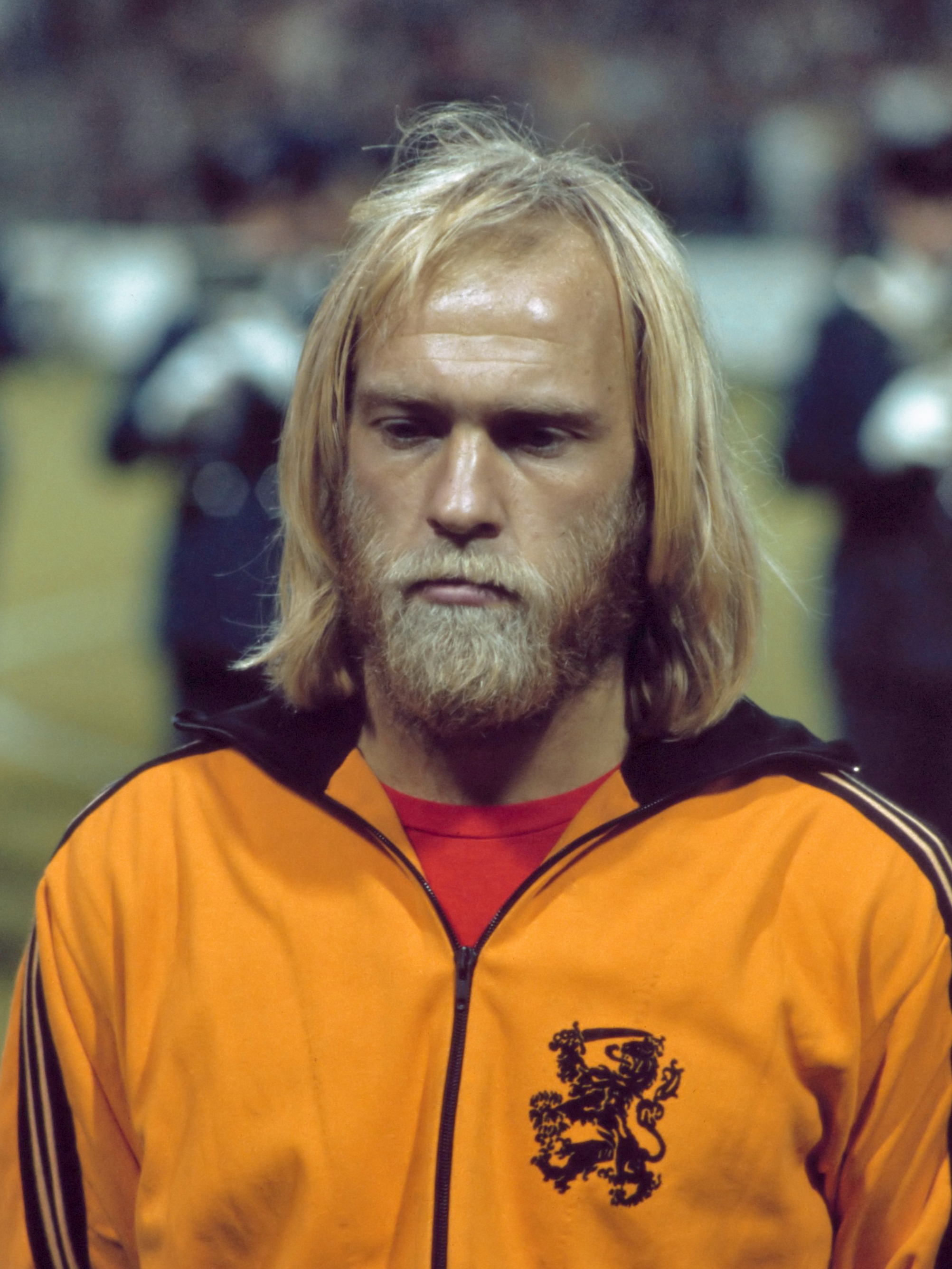
Willy Brokamp, 1973

- Wiel Coerver (1924-2011) a footballer and manager
- Piet Giesen (born 1945) a Dutch footballer
- Willy Brokamp (born 1946) a Dutch footballer, with about 400 club caps
- Pierre Vermeulen (born 1956) a Dutch footballer with about 400 club caps
- Gène Hanssen (born 1959) a Dutch football player with about 400 club caps
- René Trost (born 1965) a Dutch footballer with 323 club caps and football manager
- Sieb Dijkstra (born 1966) a Dutch football goalkeeper with over 200 club caps
- Jörg Müller (born 1969) a Dutch-born German BMW factory driver
- Mark Flekken (born 1993) a Dutch footballer
- Joshua Brenet (born 1994) a Dutch footballer
- Jannah Sonnenschein (born 1996) a Dutch–Mozambican swimmer, competed at the 2016 Summer Olympics
- Jade Suvrijn (born 1995) a French tennis player
- Heinz Vroomen (1918-2003) a Dutch footballer

== See also ==
- List of mayors of Kerkrade
