= Southeast Limburgish dialect =

Limburgish variety

Southeast Limburgish (Dutch: Zuidoost-Limburgs) is a cover term for the Ripuarian dialects spoken in Dutch Limburg.

In the Netherlands and Belgium this group is often included in the generic term Limburgish. Limburgish was recognised as a regional language in the Netherlands and as such it receives moderate protection under chapter 2 of the European Charter for Regional or Minority Languages.

== Southeast Limburgish and related dialects in Germany and Belgium ==
Variants of Southeast Limburgish are spoken around Kerkrade, Bocholtz and Vaals in the Netherlands. Closely related Ripuarian varieties are spoken in Herzogenrath and Aachen in Germany and Raeren and Eynatten in Belgium.

== Phonology ==
As most other dialects of Ripuarian and Limburgish, Southeast Limburgish features a distinction between the thrusting tone (Dutch: stoottoon, German: Schärfung or Stoßton), which has a shortening effect on the syllable (not shown in transcriptions in this article) and the slurring tone (Dutch: sleeptoon, German: Schleifton). In this article, the slurring tone is transcribed as a high tone, whereas the thrusting tone is left unmarked. This is nothing more than a convention, as the phonetics of the Southeast Limburgish pitch accent are severely under-researched. There are minimal pairs, for example moer /ˈmuːʀ/ 'wall' - moer /ˈmúːʀ/ 'carrot' in the Kerkrade dialect.

Kerkrade consonants
		Labial	Alveolar	Postalveolar	Dorsal	Glottal
Nasal		m	n		ŋ	
Plosive	voiceless	p	t		k	
Plosive	voiced	b	d		(ɡ)	
Affricate	voiceless		ts	tʃ		
Affricate	voiced			dʒ		
Fricative	voiceless	f	s	ʃ	χ	
Fricative	voiced	v	z	ʒ	ʁ	ɦ
Liquid			l		ʀ	
Approximant		w			j	

The sounds corresponding to Limburgish /x, ɣ/ are very back after back vowels, being uvular [χ, ʁ] (as in Luxembourgish), rather than velar as in Limburgish. In fact, there is not much of a difference between /ʁ/ and /ʀ/ in the Kerkrade dialect.

Most instances of historical /ɡ/ (/ɣ/ in Limburgish and (southern) Standard Dutch) have merged with /j/, so that the word for green in the Kerkrade dialect is jreun /ˈjʀøːn/ (compare Standard Dutch groen /ˈɣrun/). The dialect of Lemiers is much more similar to the dialect of Vaals than the dialect spoken in Vijlen (called Vieleter or Vielender) as the former features the High German consonant shift. In Lemiers, the etymological /ɡ/ (/ɣ/ in Limburgish and southern Standard Dutch) has not fully shifted to /j/ in consonant clusters. Thus, the word for big (Standard Dutch groot [ˈɣroːt]), varies between [ˈɣʁuəs] and [ˈjʁuəs]. A Limburgish dialectologist Will Kohnen recommends the spelling jroeës to cover this variation (cf. Vieleter groeët). In Kerkrade, the shift has been completed and so only the form [ˈjʀuəs] occurs.

The palatal [ç] is an allophone of /χ/ after consonants, the front vowels and the close-mid central /ø/, which phonologically is a front vowel. In some dialects, [ç] is fronted, which may result in a merger with [ʃ]. That is the case in the dialect of Vaals, in which the first person singular pronoun is iesj [iʃ], rather than ich [ɪç] or iech [iç] found in other dialects of Limburgish. In Aachen, [ç] is also fronted but without a merger with [ʃ], with the resulting sound being [ɕ], as it used to be the case in Luxembourgish (which is rapidly transitioning towards a full merger). The two sounds are not distinguished in Rheinische Dokumenta.

Before consonants and pauses, /ʀ/ may be vocalized to [ɐ], especially in Germany. Thus, the name of the Aachen dialect in the dialect itself is Öcher Platt [ˈœɕɐ ˈplɑt]. In the Netherlands, the consonantal pronunciation is more likely to occur.

Kerkrade vowels
		Front				Central		Back	
		unrounded		rounded		Central		Back	
		short	long	short	long	short	long	short	long
Close		i	iː	y	yː			u	uː
Close-mid		e	eː	ø	øː	ə		o	oː
Open-mid		ɛ	ɛː	œ	œː	ə		ɔ	ɔː
Open							aː	ɑ	
Diphthongs	closing	ɛɪ œʏ ɔɪ ɔʊ aɪ aʊ							
Diphthongs	centering	iə yə uə eə œə oə							

- The short close-mid vowels /e/, /ø/ and /o/ in visje /ˈveʃə/, sjuts /ˈʃøts/ and hóste /ˈɦostə/ are the same as Limburgish /ɪ/, /ʏ/ and /ʊ/. The difference lies in transcription, not in realization. The latter transcription is rooted in Standard Dutch spelling, in which the tense /i/ (spelled ⟨ie⟩) and /y/ (spelled ⟨u(u)⟩) contrast with their lax counterparts /ɪ/ (spelled ⟨i⟩) and /ʏ/ (spelled ⟨u⟩) purely by quality. In Standard German, the tense /iː, yː, uː/ (spelled ⟨i(e), ü(h), u(h)⟩) contrast with the lax /ɪ, ʏ, ʊ/ (spelled ⟨i, ü, u⟩) mainly by length, with the quality difference being secondary. In Western Germany (where Ripuarian in spoken), they are often close [i, y, u], mapping onto Ripuarian /i, y, u/, whereas the vowels in visje, sjuts and hóste are perceived as in-between the local realizations of Standard German /ɪ, ʏ, ʊ/ and /ɛ, œ, ɔ/, which is why they are spelled ⟨e, ö, o⟩ (vesche, schötz, hoste)
- /ə/ occurs only in unstressed syllables.
- /aː/ is a phonological back vowel like /ɑ/, and the two function as a long–short pair. The former is phonetically central [äː], whereas the latter is a genuine back vowel [ɑ]. In other Ripuarian varieties, the latter may also be central [ä], and for this reason it may be transcribed with ⟨a⟩.

== Bibliography ==
- Bodelier, Jorina (2011). Tone and intonation in the Lemiers dialect of Ripuarian (MA General Linguistics Thesis). Amsterdam: University of Amsterdam.
- Gilles, Peter; Trouvain, Jürgen (2013), "Luxembourgish" (PDF), Journal of the International Phonetic Association, 43 (1): 67–74, doi:10.1017/S0025100312000278
- Kohnen, Will (2003). "Sjpelling 2003 van 't Vieleter, Völser en Lemieësjer in 't kót" (PDF). Archived from the original (PDF) on 1 May 2019.
- Stichting Kirchröadsjer Dieksiejoneer (1997) [1987]. Kirchröadsjer Dieksiejoneer (in Dutch) (2nd ed.). Kerkrade: Stichting Kirchröadsjer Dieksiejoneer. ISBN 90-70246-34-1.
