= Geological monument Star stones =

Geological monument in Vaals in South Limburg, Netherlands

Coordinates: 50°46′50.34″N 5°56′50″E

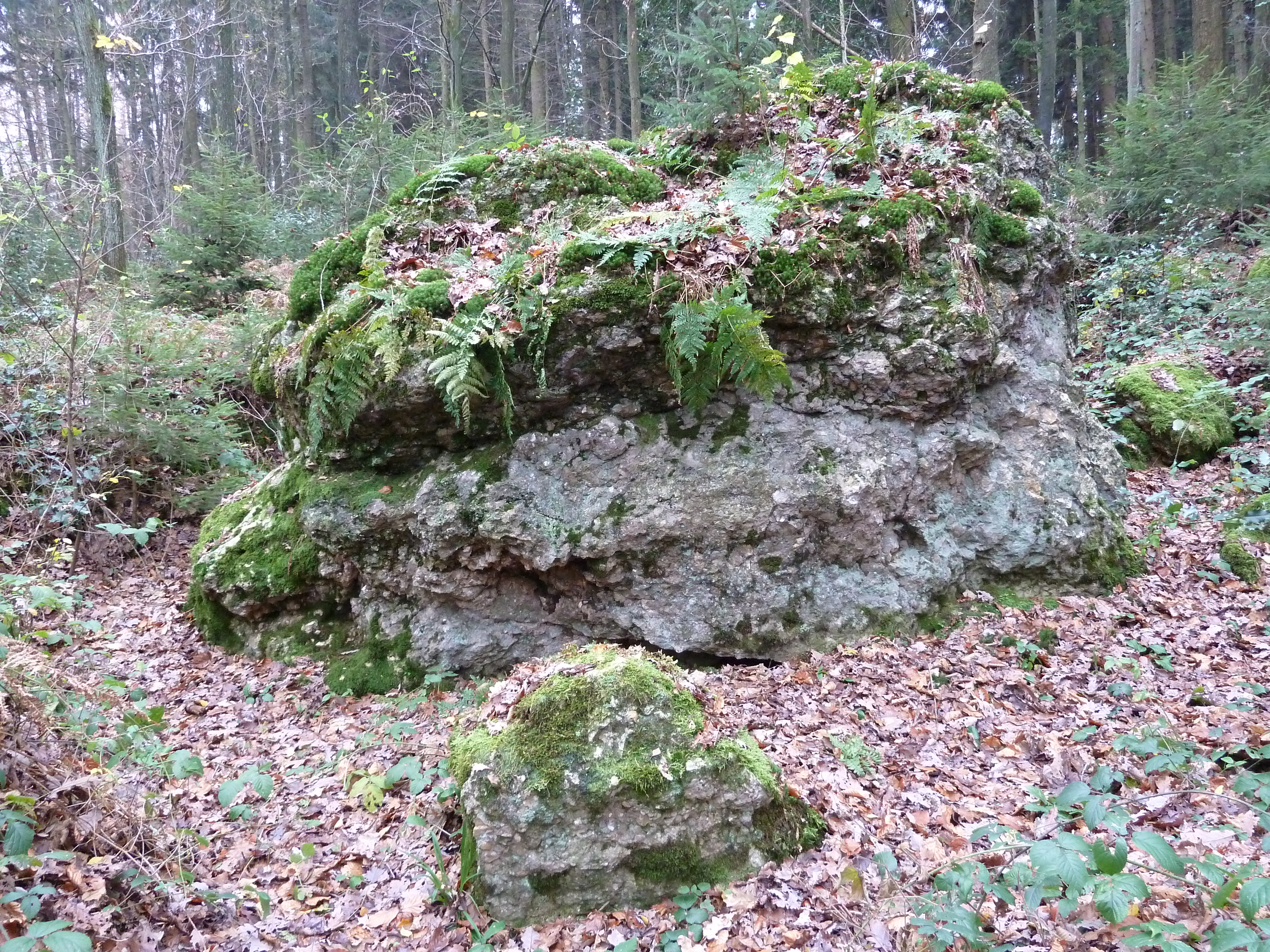
Geologisch monument Sterrenstenen

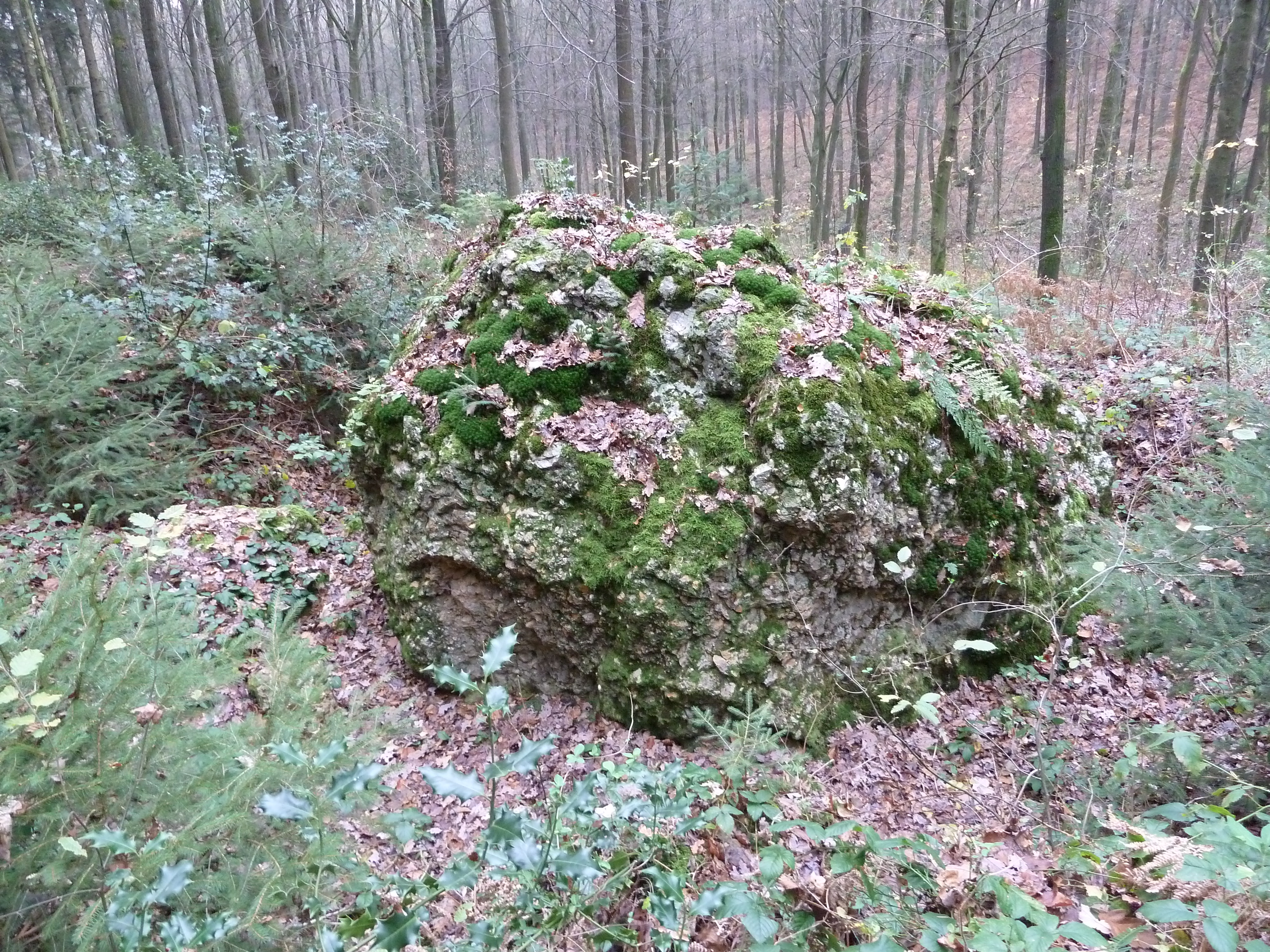

The Geological Monument Sterrenstenen is a geological monument located in the municipality of Vaals in South Limburg, Netherlands. The monument, consisting of several stone blocks, is situated in the northwestern part of the Vijlenerbos, in the Elzetterbos area on the Plateau van Vijlen.

== History ==
In earlier times, rough stones with a peculiar composition were found scattered throughout the forest. These stones were called "sterrenstenen" (star stones) because people believed they had fallen from the sky like meteorites or shooting stars.

In the 20th century, seminary students from the mission house Emmaus, located on the edge of the forest, collected a large number of these stones from the Vijlenerbos and Elzetterbos and brought them together in the park behind the mission house.

== Geology ==
During the Cretaceous period, the area of South Limburg was submerged under a Cretaceous sea, resulting in a 300-meter thick sedimentary layer of clay, sand, and chalk. This layer primarily consisted of limestone from the Gulpen Formation.

Over time, a significant portion of the limestone eroded, particularly due to rainwater seeping through the soil, which dissolved approximately 55 meters of limestone. The insoluble eluvium in these limestone layers remained in the soil as flint eluvium.The stone blocks formed between 7 and 2.5 million years ago during the late Tertiary period. The stones are breccias, composed of rough flint, gravel, and fine-grained sand, all cemented together with silica cement.

The stones in this monument are primarily composed of cemented flint, while the blocks at the Geological Monument Zandsteenblokken are composed of cemented sandstone.

The underlying strata of this area contain fine-grained glauconite-bearing sand from the Vaals Formation, overlain by yellow-gray limestone at higher elevations, both of which are covered by flint eluvium.

To the north of the blocks is the sedimentary boundary of the Oostmaas, visible in the landscape as a terrace. The Oostmaas deposited Maas gravel and sand from the Kosberg Member here.

== Legend ==
There is a legend associated with the Sterrenstenen. The tale tells of a snake residing under the largest stone, preventing the stones from being unearthed and lifted.
