= Holset =

Holset may refer to:

- Holset Engineering was a British engineering company, now Cummins
- Holset, Netherlands, a village
