= Saint Paul's Church, Vaals =

- Sint-Pauluskerk
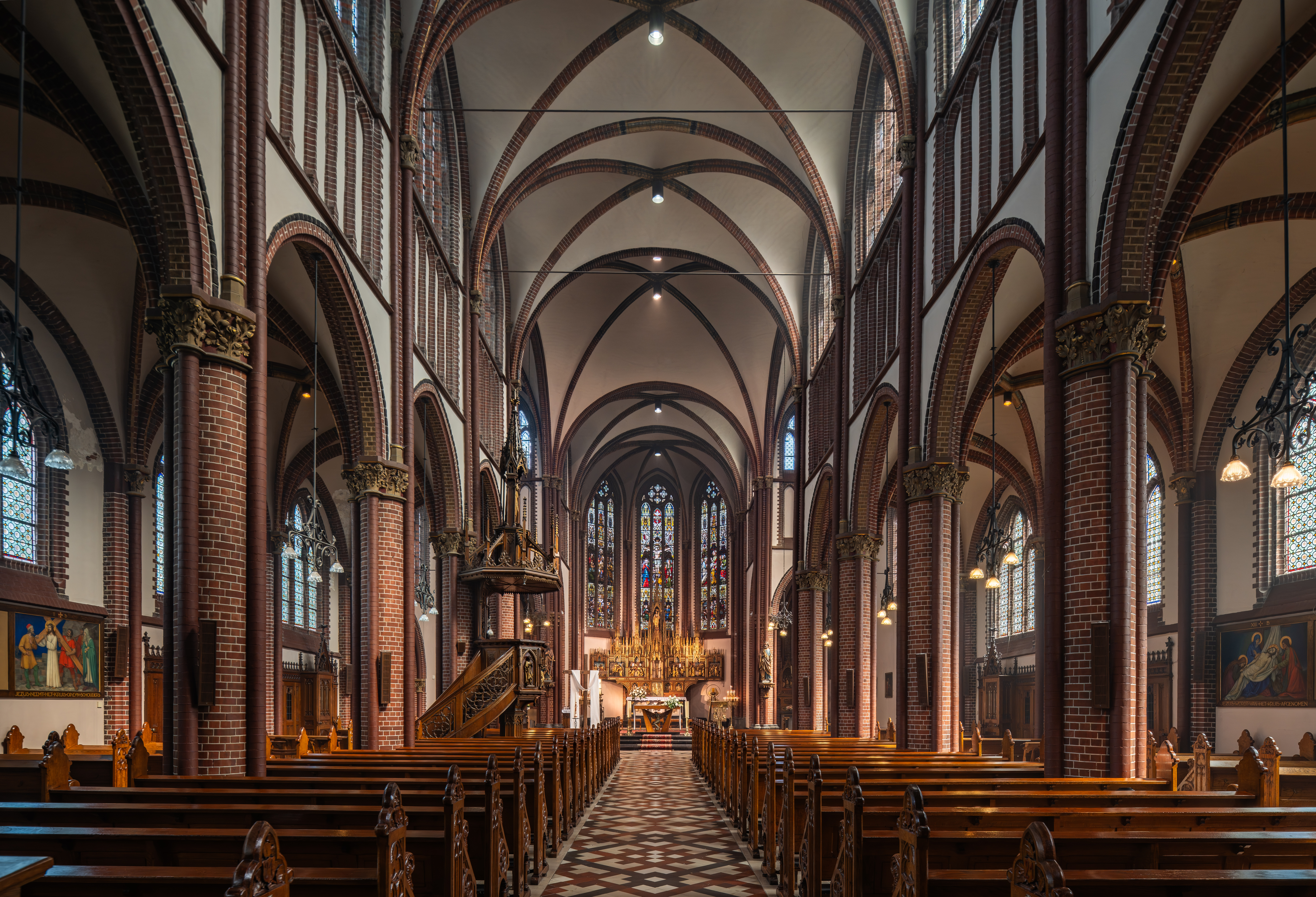
- Saint Paul's Church, Vaals
- 50.7704°N 6.0226°E
- Location: Vaals
- Country: Netherlands
- Denomination: Roman Catholic

History
- Status: Rijksmonument
- Founded: 1891-1893

Architecture
- Functional status: Catholic church
- Architect: Johannes Kayser
- Style: Neogothic

The Saint Paul's Church (Dutch: Sint-Pauluskerk) is a Roman Catholic church building in Vaals, Netherlands. The neogothic cross shaped church was built in 1891-1893 by Johannes Kayser, replacing an earlier Saint Paul's Church nearby. The building is used as parish church for the local Saint Paul parish. Patron saint for the church is Saint Paul. It has been listed as a rijksmonument, making it a national heritage site of the Netherlands.

== Gallery of images ==
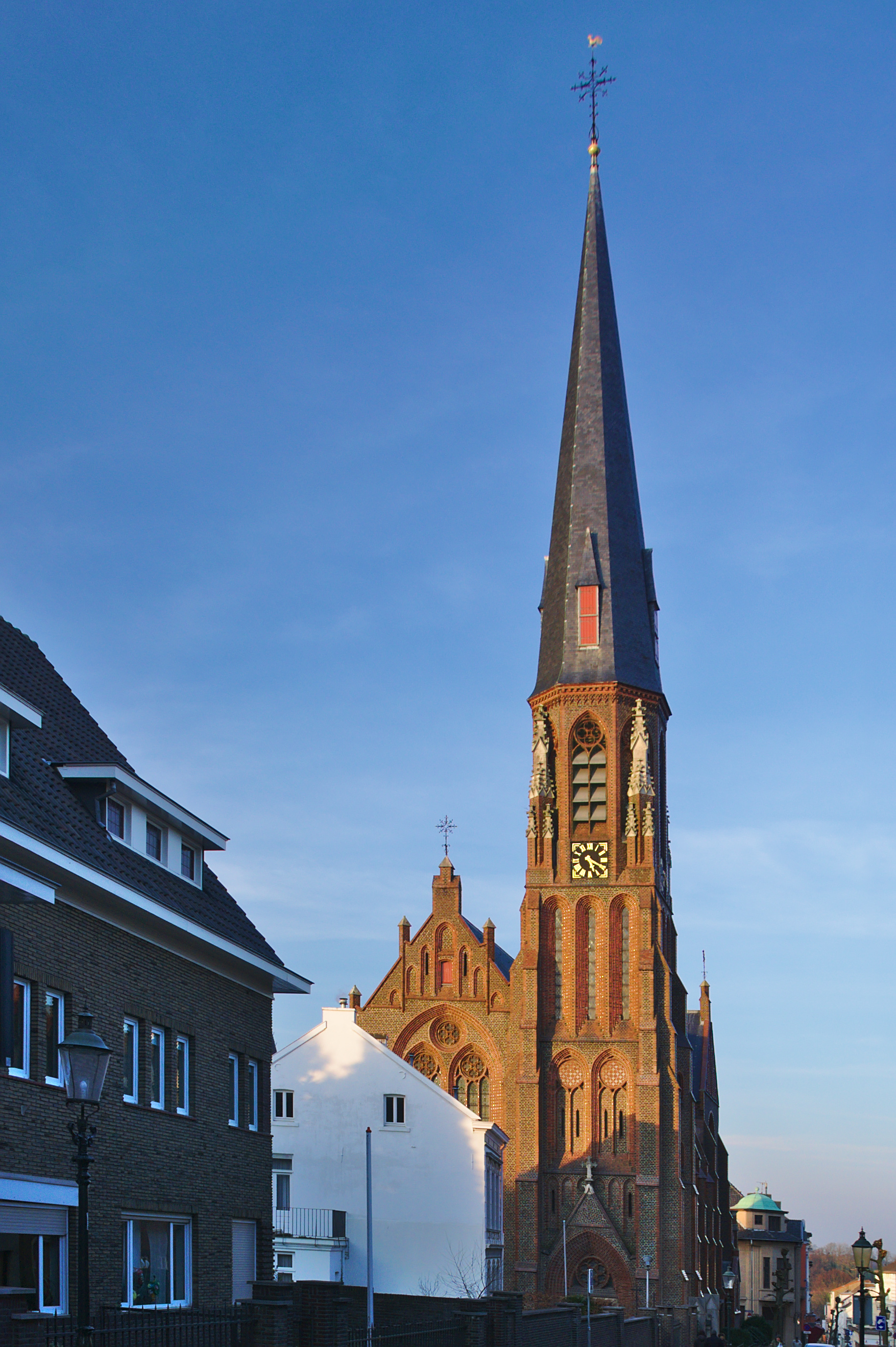

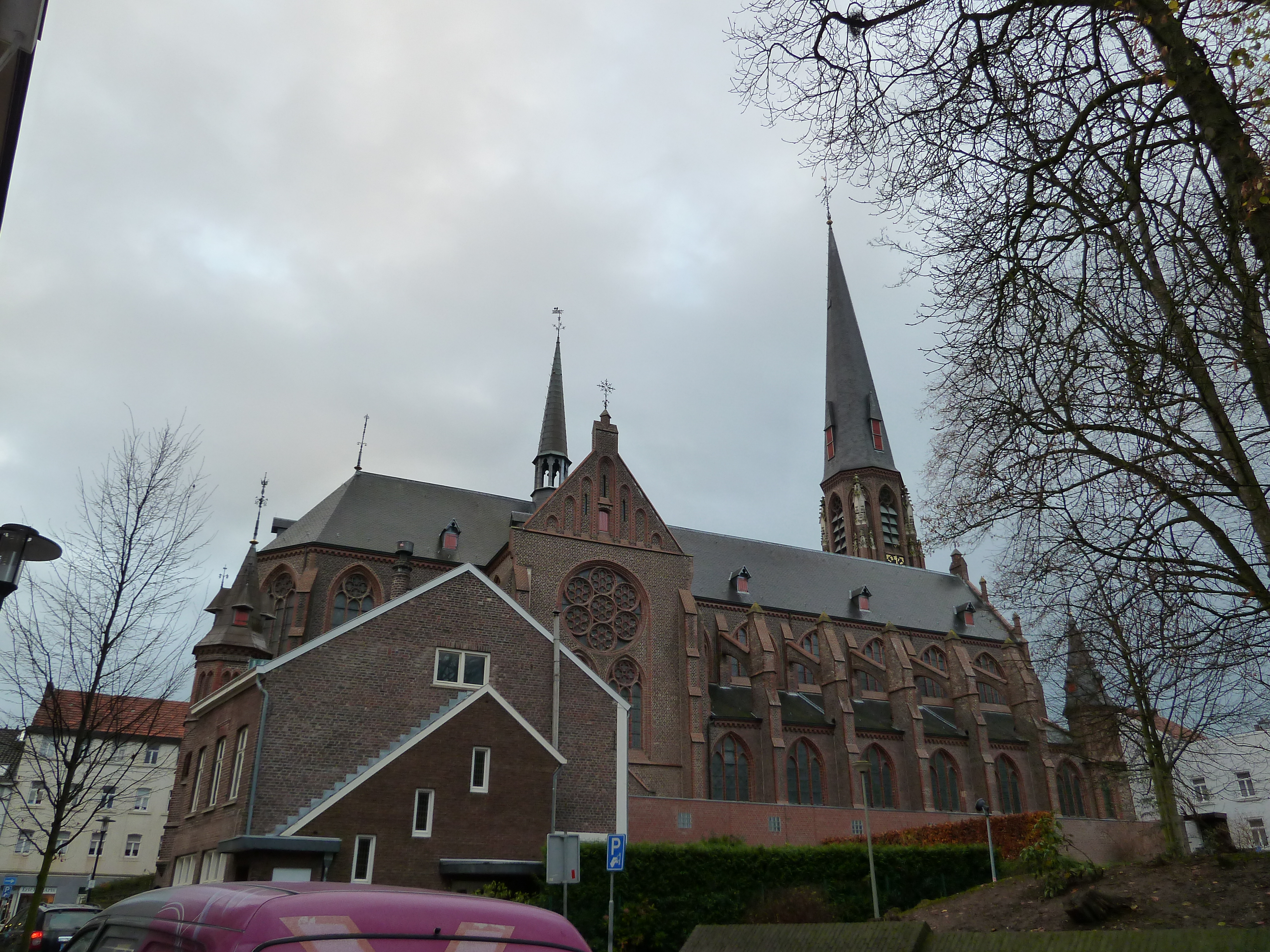

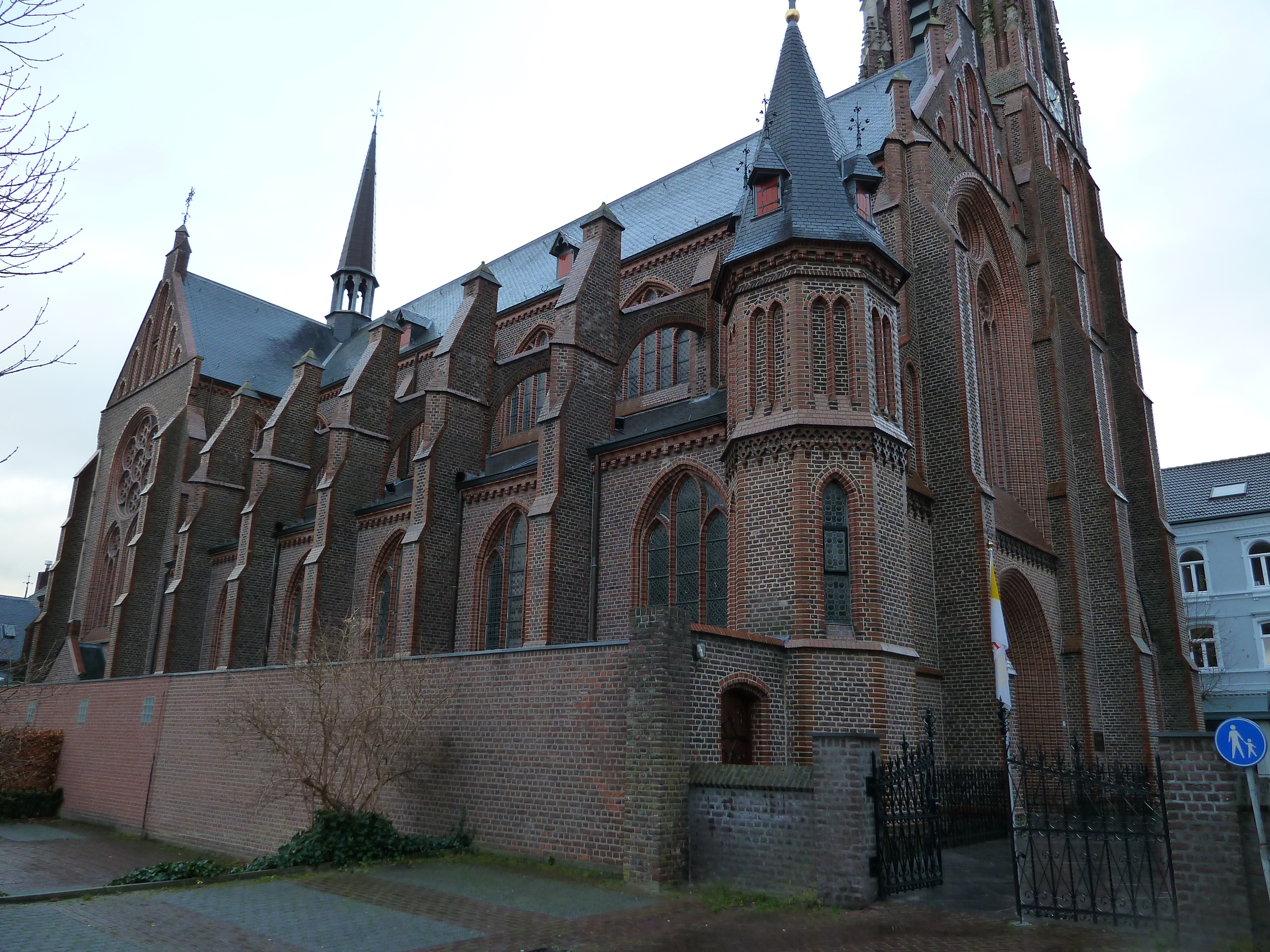

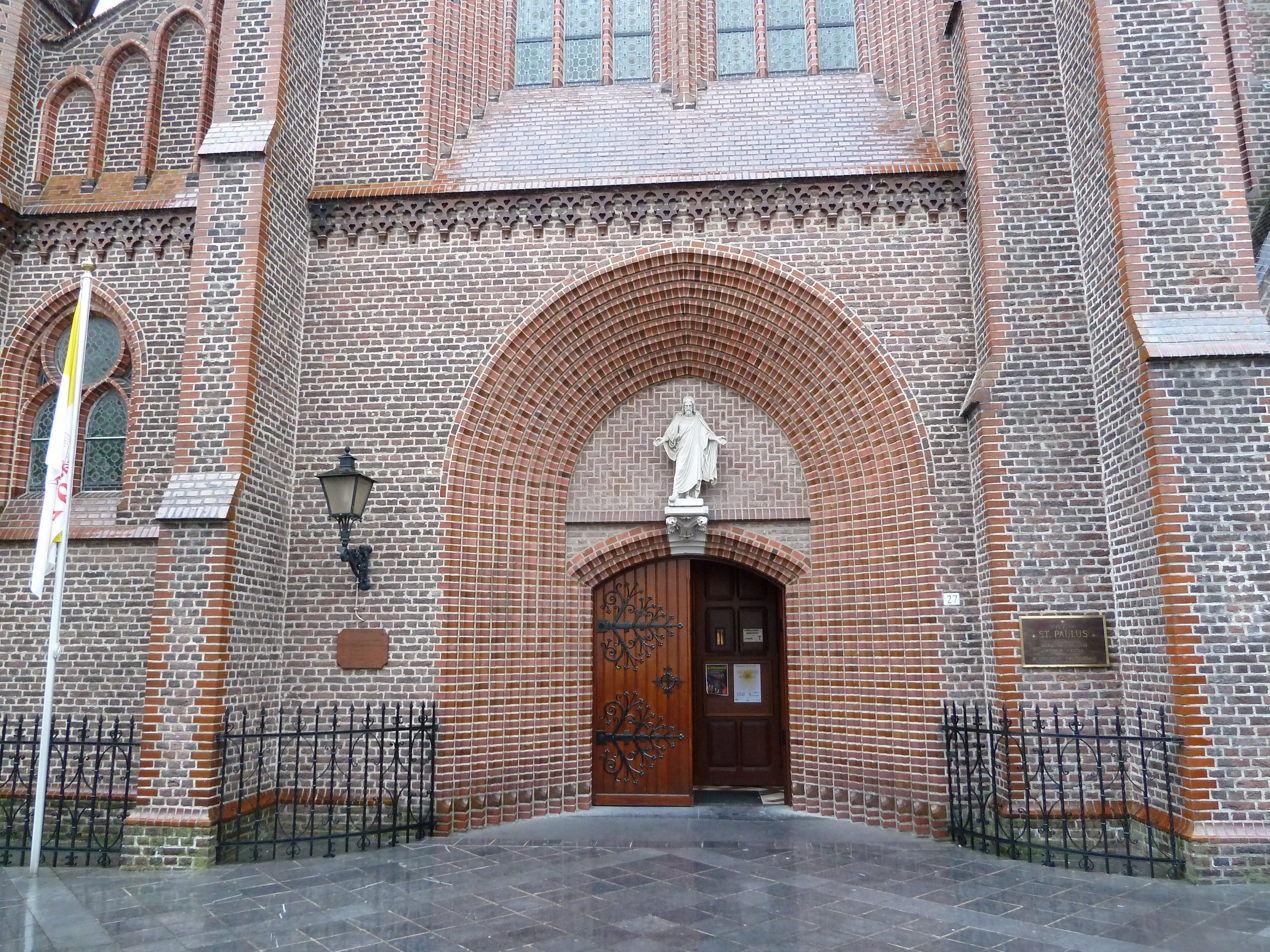

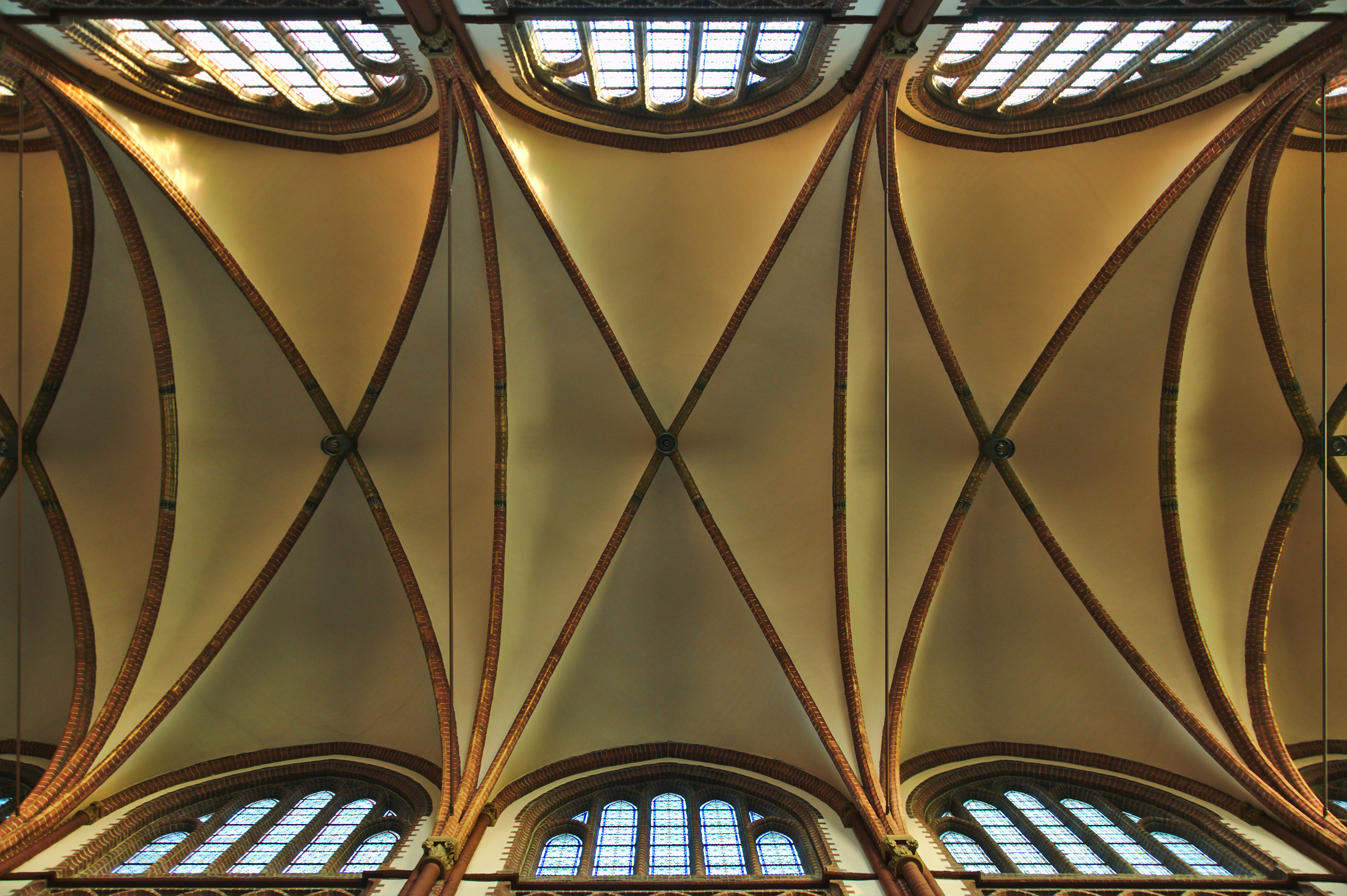

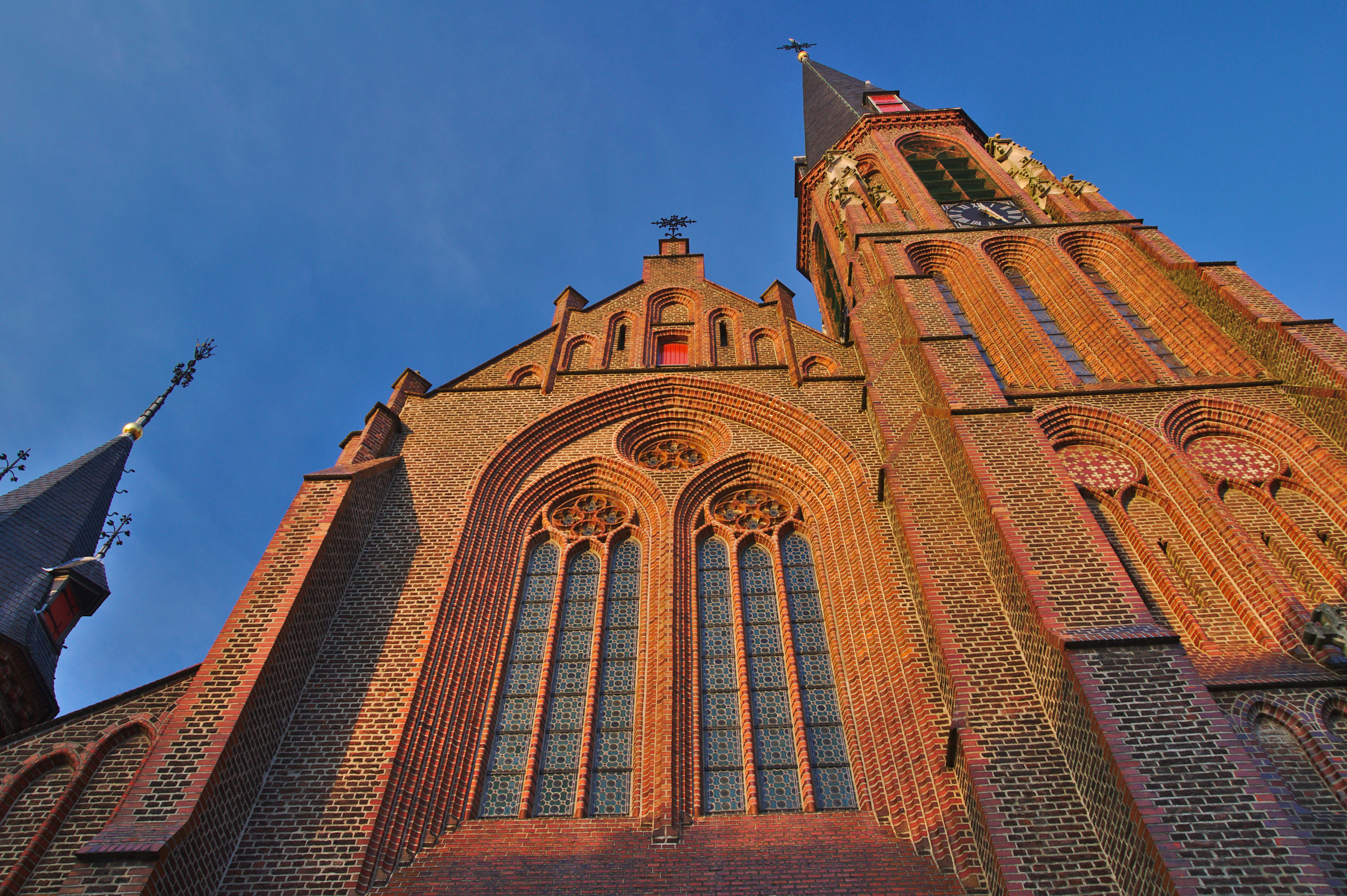

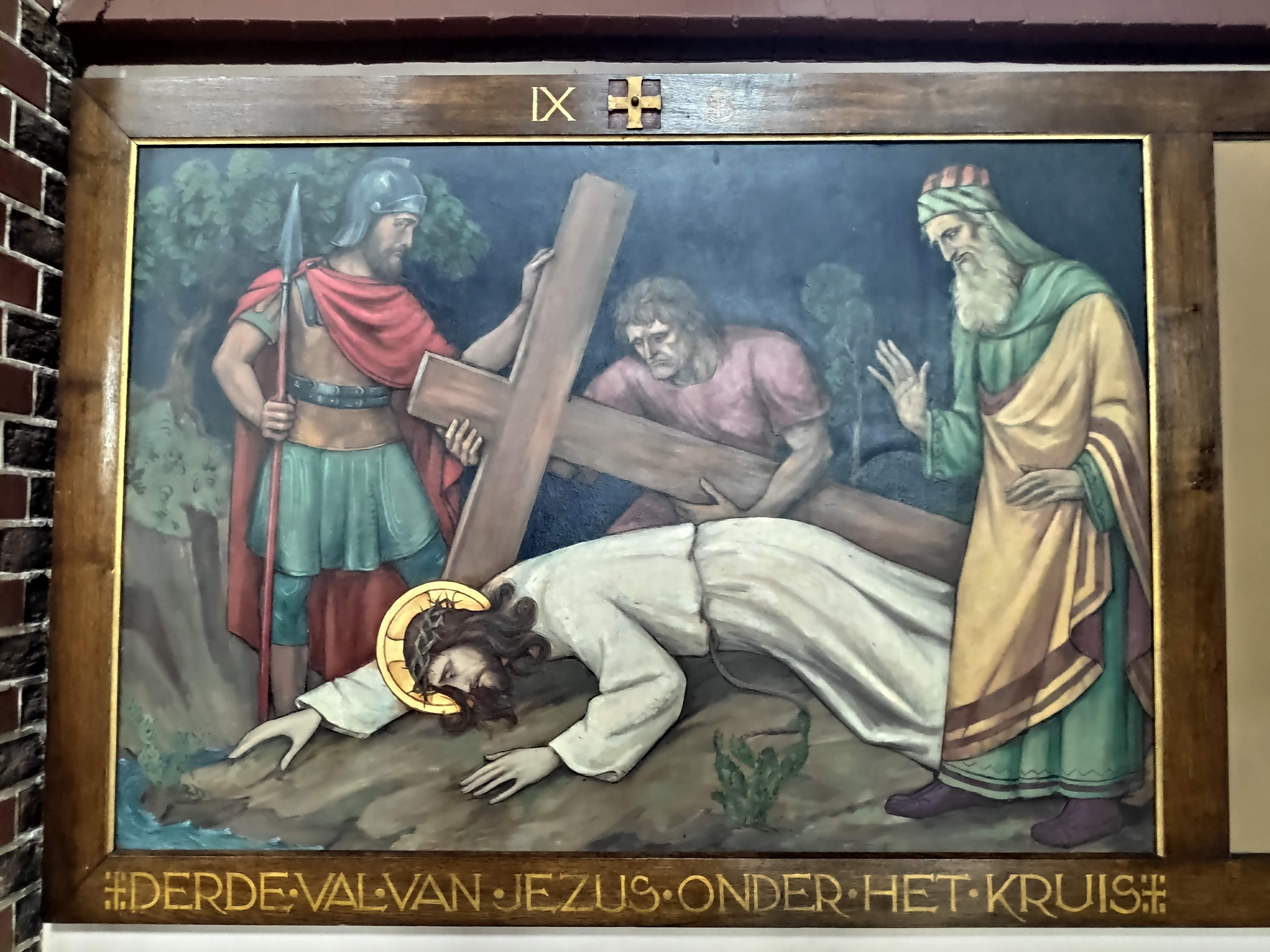
