= Kerkrade dialect =

Ripuarian dialect

- Kirchröadsj plat
- Pronunciation: [ˈkeʁəçˌʁœətʃ ˈplɑt]
- Native to: Netherlands, Germany
- Region: Kerkrade, Herzogenrath
- Language family: Indo-European: Germanic; West Germanic; Weser–Rhine Germanic; Central German; West Central German; Central Franconian; Ripuarian; West Ripuarian; Kerkrade dialect

Language codes
- ISO 639-3: –
- Glottolog: None

Kerkrade (natively Kirchröadsj plat [ˈkeʁəçˌʁœətʃ ˈplɑt] or simply Kirchröadsj, literally 'Kerkradish', Limburgish: Kirkräödsj [ˈkɪʀ(ə)kˌʀœːtʃ], Standard Dutch: Kerkraads, Standard German: (die) Mundart von Kerkrade meaning (the) dialect of Kerkrade) is a Ripuarian dialect spoken in Kerkrade and its surroundings, including Herzogenrath in Germany. It is spoken in all social classes, but the variety spoken by younger people in Kerkrade is somewhat closer to Standard Dutch.

The name Ripuarisch is strictly a scientific term on both sides of the border. Especially on the Dutch side of the border, the speakers of the Kerkrade dialect consider it to be a Limburgish dialect (see Southeast Limburgish dialect) and call it Limburgsj [ˈlembøʁəçʃ] ('Limburgish'), Kirchröadsj ('Kerkradish') or simply plat ('dialect').

== Grammar ==
=== Nouns ===
There are three grammatical genders: masculine, feminine and neuter. The corresponding definite articles are d'r /dər/, de /də/ and 't /ət/. The plural form takes the feminine article de regardless of the gender.

The plural form of nouns is formed with by adding ⟨-e⟩, ⟨-er⟩ or ⟨-s⟩ to the stem or by umlauting. Examples: sjtrief /ˈʃtriːf/ - sjtriefe /ˈʃtriːfə/, hats /ˈɦats/ - hatser /ˈɦatsər/, plavong /plaːˈvɔŋ/ - plavongs /plaːˈvɔŋs/, pansj /ˈpanʃ/ - pensj /ˈpɛnʃ/.

The plural form can also be differentiated from the singular by tone, as in 't peëd /ət ˈpéət/ - de peëd /də ˈpeət/. This can be combined with other differences, such as umlaut: sjtórm /ˈʃtórəm/ - sjturm /ˈʃtørəm/.

As in German, the plural form can be unmarked: eëpel - eëpel.

The ending ⟨-er⟩ is used mainly for neuter nouns.

== Vocabulary ==
The Kerkrade dialect has many loanwords from Standard High German, a language formerly used in school and church. However, not all German loanwords are used by every speaker.

An example sentence:

Variety		Spelling	IPA
Kerkrade dialect		Jód èse en drinke hilt lief en zieël tsezame.	[jod ˈɛːsə ʔæn ˈdʁeŋkə ˈɦelt ˈliːv æn ˈziəl tsəˈzaːmə]
Kölsch (the largest Ripuarian variety)		Jod esse un drinke hält Liev un Siel zesamme.	
Standard High German		Gut essen und trinken hält Leib und Seele zusammen.	[ɡuːt ˈʔɛsn̩ ʔʊnt ˈdʁɪŋkŋ̍ hɛlt ˈlaɪp ʔʊnt ˈzeːlə tsuˈzamən]
Standard Dutch	Communicative translation	Goed eten en drinken houdt de mens gezond.	[ɣut ˈeːtə(n) ɛn ˈdrɪŋkə(n) ˈɦʌudə ˈmɛns xəˈzɔnt]
Standard Dutch	Literal translation	Goed eten en drinken houdt lichaam en ziel samen.	[ɣut ˈeːtə(n) ɛn ˈdrɪŋkə(n) ˈɦʌut ˈlɪxaːm ɛn ˈzil ˈsaːmə(n)]
English	Communicative translation	Eating and drinking well keeps one healthy.	/ˈiːtɪŋ ən ˈdrɪŋkɪŋ ˈwɛl ˈkiːps wʌn ˈhɛlθi/
English	Literal translation	Eating and drinking well keeps the body and soul together.	/ˈiːtɪŋ ən ˈdrɪŋkɪŋ ˈwɛl ˈkiːps ðə ˈbɒdi ən ˈsoʊl təˈɡɛðər/

This example sentence illustrates both the High German consonant shift (èse, tsezame) and the [ɣ] → [j] shift (jód).

== Phonology ==
As most other Ripuarian and Limburgish dialects, the Kerkrade dialect features a distinction between the thrusting tone (Dutch: stoottoon, German: Schärfung or Stoßton), which has a shortening effect on the syllable (not shown in transcriptions in this article) and the slurring tone (Dutch: sleeptoon, German: Schleifton). In this article, the slurring tone is transcribed as a high tone, whereas the thrusting tone is left unmarked. This is nothing more than a convention, as the phonetics of the Kerkrade pitch accent are severely under-researched. There are minimal pairs, for example moer /ˈmuːr/ 'wall' - moer /ˈmúːr/ 'carrot'.

		Labial	Alveolar	Postalveolar	Dorsal	Glottal
Nasal		m	n		ŋ	
Plosive	voiceless	p	t		k	
Plosive	voiced	b	d		(ɡ)	
Affricate	voiceless		ts	tʃ		
Affricate	voiced		(dz)	(dʒ)		
Fricative	voiceless	f	s	ʃ	x	
Fricative	voiced	v	z	ʒ	ɣ	ɦ
Liquid			l		r	
Approximant		β			j	

- The Kerkrade dialect features final-obstruent devoicing, which means that the underlying /b, d, ɡ, v, z, ʒ, ɣ/ are devoiced to [p, t, k, f, s, ʃ, χ ~ ç] at the end of a word. Voiced affricates are not affected by this as they occur only in the intervocalic position. The underlying voiced stops and fricatives are realized as voiced before the plural markers /-ə/ and /-ər/: rub [ˈʁøp] - rubbe [ˈʁøbə], vroag [ˈvʁoəχ] 'question' - vroage [ˈvʁoəʁə] 'questions', wief [ˈβiːf] - wiever [ˈβiːvəʁ], or in verbal conjugation (iech loog [ˈloːχ] - ze loge [ˈlóːʁə]). The voiced [ɡ] appears only in this context. /ɣ/ has two voiced allophones: a uvular fricative [ʁ], which appears after back vowels, and a palatal approximant [j], which occurs after front vowels. They are devoiced to [χ] and [ç] in the word-final position. Phonetically, the voiced variants are the same as /r/ and /j/, which are phonological sonorants (and thus cannot participate in final-obstruent devoicing), whereas the voiceless variants are the same as the voiceless allophones of /x/.
- /dz/ is rare as a phoneme and occurs only in a few words, such as ködzele /ˈkœdzələ/ 'to drool'. This mirrors the situation in Luxembourgish.
- The sounds corresponding to Limburgish /x, ɣ/ are very back after back vowels, being uvular [χ, ʁ] (as in Luxembourgish), rather than velar as in Limburgish.
- Most instances of the historical [ɣ] have merged with [j], so that the word for green in the Kerkrade dialect is jreun /ˈjrøːn/ (compare Standard Dutch groen /ˈɣrun/). As explained above, many intervocalic instances of [j] are still phonemically /ɣ/ as it behaves like an obstruent.

Vowel phonemes
		Front				Central	Back	
		unrounded		rounded		Central	Back	
		short	long	short	long	short	short	long
Close		i	iː	y	yː		u	uː
Close-mid		e	eː	ø	øː	ə	o	oː
Open-mid		ɛ	ɛː	œ	œː	ə	ɔ	ɔː
Open							a	aː
Diphthongs	closing	ɛɪ œʏ ɔɪ ɔʊ aɪ aʊ						
Diphthongs	centering	iə yə uə eə œə oə						

- /i/ and /u/ appear only in stressed closed syllables and when unstressed.
- /iː/ and /uː/ appear only in stressed syllables.
- /ə/ occurs only in unstressed syllables.
- Both /a/ and /aː/ are phonological back vowels, but only the short /a/ is phonetically back: [ɑ]. The long /aː/ is phonetically central [äː] (hereafter represented without the diacritic).

== Spelling ==
The spelling presented here, which is to a large extent Dutch-based is used in Kirchröadsjer dieksiejoneer, the only dictionary of the Kerkrade dialect. There is no official German-based orthography.

Letters
a	b	d	e	è	f	g	h	i	j	k	l	m	n	o	ó	ö	p	r	s	t	u	ü	v	w	z

Furthermore, there is ⟨ë⟩, which never appears as a separate letter, but only in the centering diphthongs ⟨eë⟩, ⟨ieë⟩ and ⟨oeë⟩ (phonetically /eə/, /iə/ and /uə/). However, only half of the centering diphthongs are spelled this way; the remaining /yə/, /œə/ and /oə/ are spelled ⟨üe⟩, ⟨öa⟩ and ⟨oa⟩. In other dialects and regional languages of the Netherlands, ⟨oa⟩ is sometimes used for the long open /ɔː/, which is always spelled ⟨ao⟩ in this orthography.

As the orthography is Dutch-based, it does not make use of the Eszett ⟨ß⟩, which is extensively used on the other side of the border. It represents the phoneme /s/. In turn, German-based orthographies use ⟨s⟩ for the /z/ sound, whereas ⟨z⟩ is restricted for the voiceless alveolar affricate /ts/, though it can also be spelled ⟨tz⟩. Furthermore, the letter ⟨ä⟩ found in those orthographies is also not used. It stands for either /ɛ/ or /ɛː/ in German-based orthographies.

In this orthography, /s/ is spelled ⟨s⟩, /z/ is spelled ⟨z⟩ (although ⟨s⟩ is used in the stem-final position), /ts/ is spelled ⟨ts⟩, /ɛ/ is spelled ⟨e⟩, whereas /ɛː/ is spelled ⟨è⟩ (rather than ⟨ae⟩, which is a common spelling in Dutch-based orthographies of Limburgish).

The orthography is highly phonemic, with the exception of the spelling of /ɡ, v, z, ɣ, ʒ/ which, for the most part, are spelled phonetically. As in Limburgish, Swedish and Norwegian, stress and tone are not marked, blurring the distinction between /eː/ and /ə/ in open syllables and between /ɛ/ and /ə/ in closed syllables, where the distinction between the short /i, u/ on the one hand and the long /iː, uː/ on the other is also blurred. The grapheme-phoneme correspondence is as follows:

Spelling	Phoneme	Realization	Example words
a (Note: The single letters ⟨a, e, o, u⟩ followed by a single intervocalic consonant denote the free vowels /aː, eː, oː, yː/. The same pronunciation applies whenever the vowel is doubled: ⟨aa, ee, oo, uu⟩. The short /e, o, y/ are given a separate, unambiguous spelling ⟨i, ó, ü⟩. When the consonant is doubled, the single letters ⟨a, e, o, u⟩ denote the checked vowels /a, ɛ, ɔ, ø/. The same pronunciation applies before a single word-final consonant. Consonants are also redundantly doubled after ⟨i, ó, ü⟩ and also ⟨ö⟩, which denotes /œ/. In addition, ⟨e⟩ denotes /ə/ in unstressed syllables.)	/a/	[ɑ]	bakke
a	/aː/	[aː]	jape
aa	/aː/	[aː]	kaat, sjaa
ai	/aɪ/	[aɪ]	fain
ao	/ɔː/	[ɔː]	kaod
auw	/aʊ/	[aʊ]	kauw
äo	/œː/	[œː]	kräoche
äu	/ɔɪ/	[ɔɪ]	vräud
b	/b/ (Note: The voiceless-voiced pairs of obstruents /p–b, t–d, k–ɡ, f–v, s–z, ʃ–ʒ, x–ɣ/ are neutralized in the syllable-final position (voiced affricates do not occur in this position). This is reflected in the orthography in the case of fricatives, but not in the case of the stops (excluding /ɡ/). German-based orthographies may preserve these distinctions; compare Kerkrade wief with Colognian Wiev. All obstruents, including the voiceless affricates /ts/ and /tʃ/, surface as voiced before voiced obstruents and word-initial vowels (including compounds) and as voiceless elsewhere (see final obstruent devoicing). The voiceless allophones of the /x–ɣ/ pair are the uvular [χ] after back vowels and the palatal [ç] after front vowels and consonants. The voiced ones are [ʁ] and [j], not dissimilar to /r/ and /j/ which are phonological sonorants. /ɣ/ does not occur in the word-initial position, where it has been replaced with /j/. /ɡ/ has never occurred in this position, only /j/ does.)	[b]	
b	/b/	[p]	
ch	/x/	[ç]	
ch	/x/	[χ]	maache
ch	/x/	[j]	
ch	/x/	[ʁ]	
d	/d/	[d]	
d	/d/	[t]	
dz	/dz/	[dz]	ködzele
dzj	/dʒ/	[dʒ]	pieëdzje
e	/ɛ/	[ɛ]	sjtek
e	/ɛ/	[æ] (Note: Allophone of /ɛ/ before /m, n, ŋ, l, r/.)	
e	/ə/	[ə]	oavend
e	/eː/	[eː]	dene
ee	/eː/	[eː]	deer
eë	/eə/	[eə]	keëts
ei (Note: The usage depends on the spelling of the Dutch cognate of the word.)	/ɛɪ/	[ɛɪ]	knei
ij	/ɛɪ/	[ɛɪ]	jekkerij
eu	/øː/	[øː]	meun
è	/ɛː/	[ɛː]	nès
f	/f/	[f]	
f	/f/	[v]	
f	/v/	[f]	wief
g	/ɣ/	[ʁ]	
g	/ɣ/	[j]	zeëgblad
g	/ɣ/	[χ]	
g	/ɣ/	[ç]	zeëg
gk	/ɡ/	[ɡ]	herregke
h	/ɦ/ (Note: /ɦ/ occurs only in the syllable initial position, whereas /ŋ/ occurs only in the syllable-final position.)	[ɦ]	
i	/e/	[e]	rikke
ie	/i/	[i]	
ie	/iː/	[iː]	
ieë	/iə/	[iə]	
j	/j/	[j]	jód
j	/ɣ/	[j]	zeëje
k	/k/	[k]	
k	/k/	[ɡ]	
k	/ɡ/	[k]	herrek
l	/l/	[l]	
m	/m/	[m] (Note: Apart from /ŋ/, nasals assimilate to the place of articulation of the following consonant: they merge to [m] before bilabial consonants and to [ɱ] before labiodental consonants. The alveolar /n/ is further assimilated to the postalveolar [n̠] before postalveolar consonants (which is not marked in transcriptions in this article) and to the velar [ŋ] before velar consonants. In those contexts, /m/ remains bilabial [m].)	
m	/m/	[ɱ]	
n	/n/	[n]	
n	/n/	[m]	
n	/n/	[ɱ]	
n	/n/	[ŋ]	
ng	/ŋ/	[ŋ]	
o	/ɔ/	[ɔ]	
o	/oː/	[oː]	
oa	/oə/	[oə]	
oe	/u/	[u]	
oe	/uː/	[uː]	
oeë	/uə/	[uə]	
oo	/oː/	[oː]	
ouw	/ɔʊ/	[ɔʊ]	
ó	/o/	[o]	
ö	/œ/	[œ]	
öa	/œə/	[œə]	
p	/p/	[p]	
p	/p/	[b]	
r	/r/	[ʁ]	
s	/s/	[s]	
s	/s/	[z]	
s	/z/	[s]	
sj	/ʃ/	[ʃ]	
sj	/ʃ/	[ʒ]	
sj	/ʒ/	[ʃ]	
t	/t/	[t]	
t	/t/	[d]	
ts	/ts/	[ts]	
ts	/ts/	[dz]	
tsj	/tʃ/	[tʃ]	
u	/ø/	[ø]	
u	/yː/	[yː]	
uu	/yː/	[yː]	
ui	/œʏ/	[œʏ]	
ü	/y/	[y]	
üe	/yə/	[yə]	
v	/v/	[v]	wieve
v	/v/	[f]	
w	/β/	[β]	
z	/z/	[z]	
z	/z/	[s]	
zj	/ʒ/	[ʒ]	

== Related dialects ==
The most similar other Ripuarian dialects are those of Bocholtz, Vaals and Aachen.

A distinct East Limburgish dialect called Egelzer plat is spoken in Eygelshoven, in the north of the Kerkrade municipality. The biggest differences between the two is the presence of the High German consonant shift in the Kerkrade dialect as well the pronunciation of the sound written ⟨g⟩ in Limburgish; in Eygelshoven, it is pronounced as in Limburgish and (southern) standard Dutch (as a voiced velar fricative), whereas in the Kerkrade dialect it is pronounced as in Colognian, as a palatal approximant (where it is spelled ⟨j⟩), except after back vowels where it is rhotacized to a voiced uvular fricative, resulting in a phonetic merger with /r/.

== Bibliography ==
- Gilles, Peter; Trouvain, Jürgen (2013). "Luxembourgish" (PDF). Journal of the International Phonetic Association. 43 (1): 67–74. doi:10.1017/S0025100312000278.
- Stichting Kirchröadsjer Dieksiejoneer (1997) [1987]. Kirchröadsjer Dieksiejoneer (in Dutch) (2nd ed.). Kerkrade: Stichting Kirchröadsjer Dieksiejoneer. ISBN 90-70246-34-1.
- Stichting Kirchröadsjer Dieksiejoneer (2003). Benders, Jo; Hirsch, Herman; Stelsmann, Hans; Vreuls, Frits (eds.). Kirchröadsjer Zagenswies (in Dutch). Kerkrade: Stichting Kirchröadsjer Dieksiejoneer. ISBN 90-70246-47-3.
