= Vaals =

Town in Limburg province, Netherlands

Vaals Vols
- Municipality
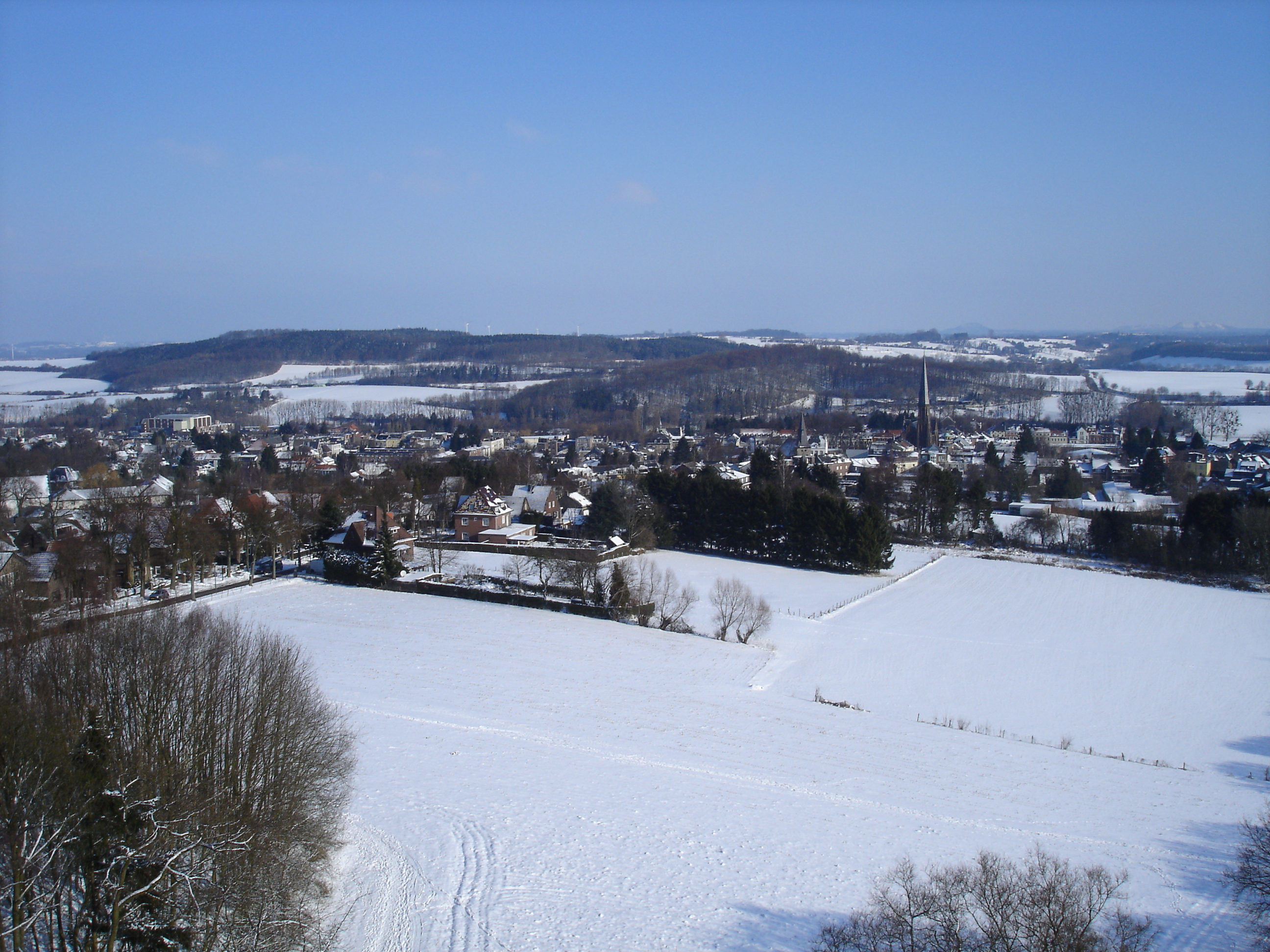
- View of Vaals

- Flag Coat of arms

- Location in Limburg
- Coordinates: 50°46′N 6°1′E
- Country: Netherlands
- Province: Limburg

Government
  - Body: Municipal council
  - Mayor: Harry Leunessen (PvdA)

Area
  - Total: 23.90 km^{2} (9.23 sq mi)
  - Land: 23.89 km^{2} (9.22 sq mi)
  - Water: 0.01 km^{2} (0.0039 sq mi)
- Elevation: 200 m (660 ft)
- Highest elevation: 322.7 m (1,059 ft)

Population (January 2021)
  - Total: 10,084
  - Density: 422/km^{2} (1,090/sq mi)
- Demonym: Vaalzer
- Time zone: UTC+1 (CET)
  - Summer (DST): UTC+2 (CEST)
- Postcode: 6290–6295
- Area code: 043
- Website: www.vaals.nl

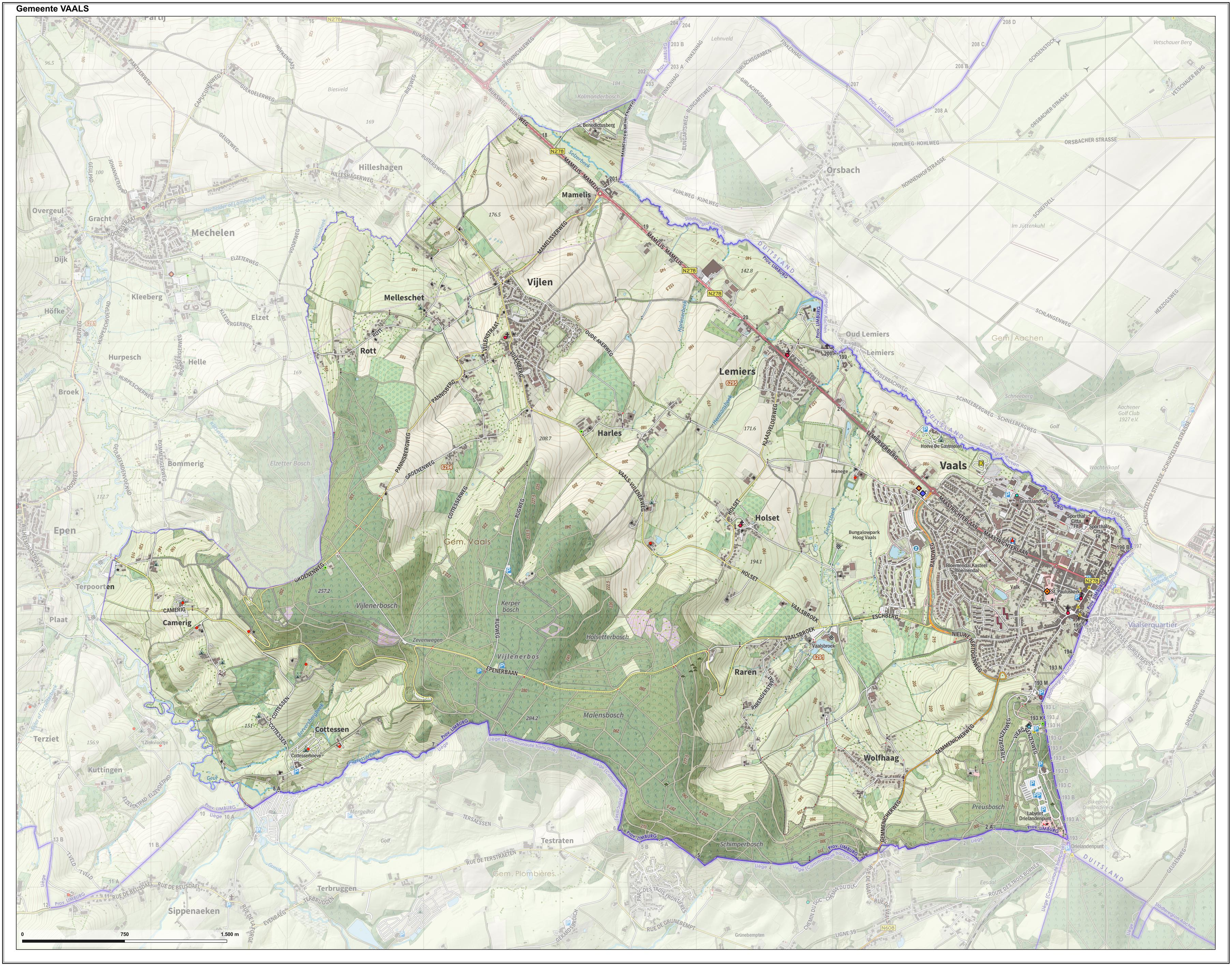
Map of the municipality of Vaals, June 2015

Vaals (Dutch: [vaːls]; Vaals dialect: Vols [vɔls]) is a town in the extreme southeastern part of the Dutch province of Limburg, itself in the southeast of the Netherlands.

The municipality covers an area of 23.90 km^{2} (9.23 sq mi).It is situated in the western foothills of the Ardennes–Eifelrange and lies some 23 km (14 mi) east of Maastricht and 5 km (3.1 mi) west of the German city of Aachen.

Vaals directly adjoins both Belgium and Germany. As such three national borders meet at a point known as the Drielandenpunt and very near the highest point in the Netherlands, the Vaalserberg. The Vaalserberg was previously known as "Hubertusberg", so named for the eighth century St.Hubertus.

== History ==
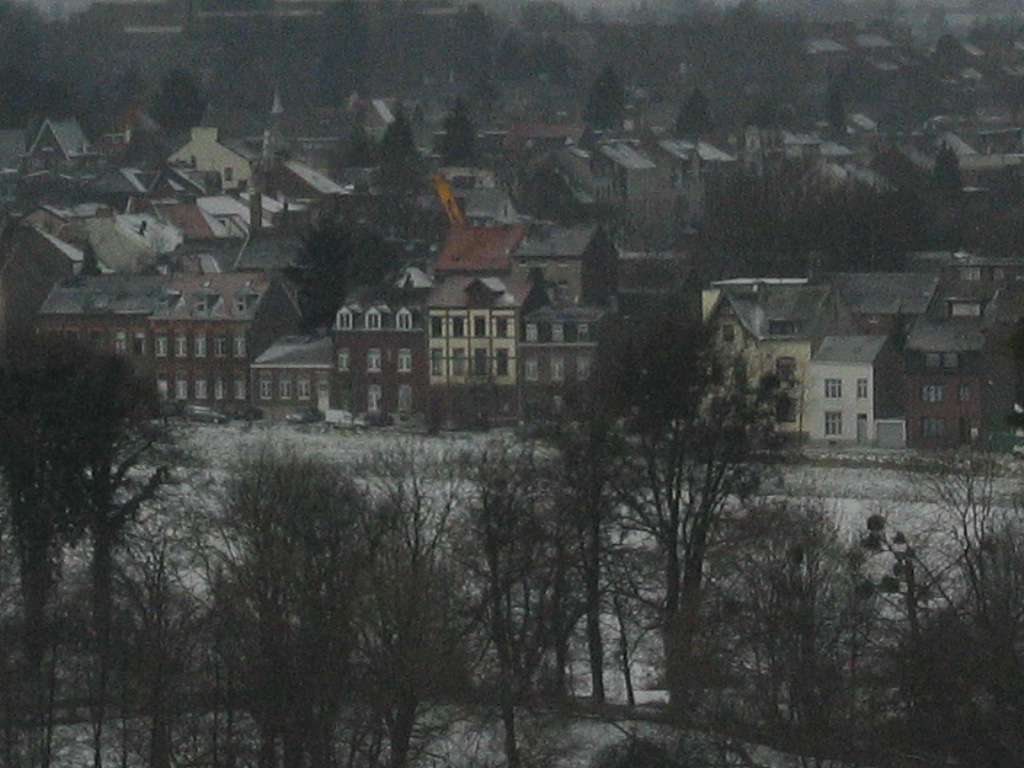
View of Vaals

Vaals' name is derived from Latin, one of very few such geographical names in the Netherlands. The south of the Dutch province of Limburg, which included 'Vallis', was previously part of the Roman Empire, the local region having been centred on the present day German city of Cologne (Colonia Claudia Ara Agrippinensium).

Vaals is first mentioned in historical documents in the year 1041. The village was referred to as either Vals or Vallis, meaning valley. In that time Holy Roman Emperor Henry III donated land to the Abbey of St. Adalbert. To distinguish this from any land closer to the nearby city of Aachen, it is specifically referred to as being "in the valley" – in Vallis.

Vaals' geographical location in Europe meant that it eventually came to lie on the boundary between traditional Catholic and emerging Protestant powers. Commencing in the 16th century Catholic Spain sought to suppress a Protestant uprising in its Dutch territories. During the resulting war a force loyal to Protestant William of Orange in 1568 passed through Vaals and looted the Catholic St. Paul's Church.

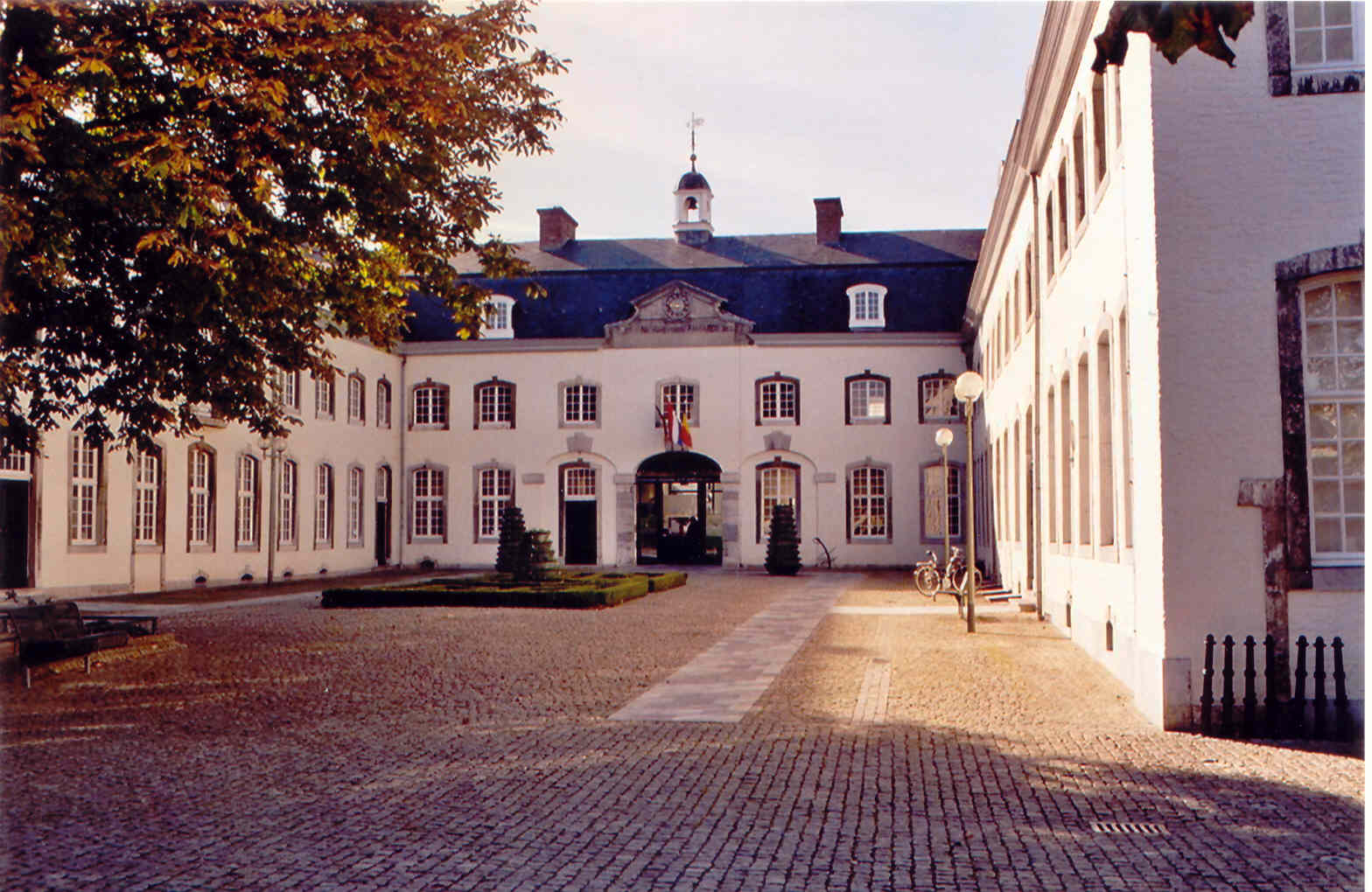
Clermont House at Vaals

In 1661 Vaals became a part of the Republic of the United Netherlands. As such it attracted entrepreneurs who developed it into a prosperous manufacturing hub. One prominent industrial family of the era were the Von Clermonts, who moved from then Prussian Aachen to Vaals in 1761. They established a prosperous linen factory which went on to attract custom from as far afield as Prussia, Austria, Poland and even Russia. In 1717 Tsar Peter the Great had supposedly visited the Von Clermonts. In 1803, Napoleon Bonaparte, Emperor of France, and his wife Josephine de Beauharnais visited Vaals and stayed in the family's recently constructed Bloemendal Castle.

The Conference of Vienna in 1815 determined that the city of Aachen was to be assigned to Prussia while Vaals went to the Kingdom of the Netherlands. Belgium declared its independence from the Netherlands in 1830, the new nation including Vaals within its boundaries. In 1839 Vaals was reassigned by the Treaty of London (1839) to the Netherlands.

This treaty also created the small Neutral Territory of Moresnet, the new borders of which met up with those of Belgium, the Netherlands and Prussia at a point just outside Vaals. While Moresnet had a flag (Black-White-Blue), it had no head of state or government. It was created by neighbouring European powers wanting to regulate the mining of deposits of tin, then a notably scarce metal, that existed within its boundaries. The Viergrenzenweg ("Four-Borders-Road") still exists in Vaals, a reminder of the era lasting from 1839 to 1919, after which Moresnet was absorbed into Belgium.

Expanding industrialization and protectionist policies outside the Netherlands during the 19th century directly contributed to the notable decline of manufacturing in Vaals after 1840. Thereafter a regional resort town gradually emerged, catering mainly to the neighbouring Germans. Vaals came to be referred to as 'Vaalser Paradies', even acquiring several casinos during the period. To further cross border economic activity a tram line was constructed joining Aachen to Vaals by 1922 and extending across southern Limburg to Maastricht in 1924.

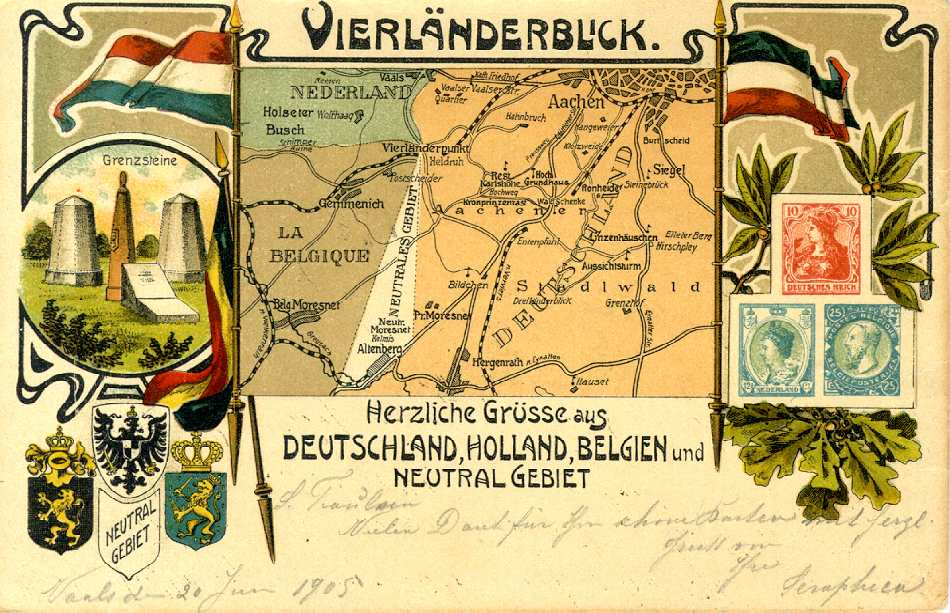
Four-Border-Point

Vaals was occupied by German forces on May 10th 1940, the first day of hostilities in western Europe. German occupation lasted for over four years, Vaals being liberated by advancing Allied forces in September 1944.

Post-war recovery was initially slow and was responsible for a viable smuggling trade. The 'Owls of Vaals', as the cross border night-time smugglers came to be known, prospered, dealing in such commodities as coffee, chocolate and tobacco.

To this day Vaals is a tourist site, gathering its income mostly from German, Belgian and Dutch tourists as well as being a retail centre, especially for the Germans. As such the town of Vaals can be seen as the Dutch suburb of the German city of Aachen. Approximately a quarter of the inhabitants are German. Vaals is also well integrated into Aachen's public transport system.

The German dialect spoken in Vaals is a form of Middle German and only distantly related to Standard Dutch. Together with a number of other dialects spoken in western Germany it is a part of the Ripuarian language family.

== Population ==
The municipality of Vaals comprises four villages and nine townships. Vaals' vicinity to Germany has resulted in a present day population that is approximately one quarter German in origin.

=== Villages ===
Number of inhabitants on 1/1/2005:

Dutch name	Limburgian name	Inhabitants
Vaals	Vols	7360
Vijlen	Viele	1340
Lemiers	Lemieësj	780
Holset	Hozelt	160
(Source: CBS)

=== Hamlets ===
As well as the official villages and towns, the Vaals municipality also includes a number of townships:

- Camerig
- Cottessen
- Harles
- Mamelis
- Melleschet
- Raren
- Rott
- Wolfhaag

== Politics ==
The current municipal council of Vaals was elected at the 2026 local elections.

Parties	Seats 2018	Seats 2022	Seats 2026
Visie Vaals (ViVa)	-	3	5
Nuj Lies Vroemen	2	2	3
CDA	3	3	2
Local!	2	2	2
PvdA (2026 with GL)	2	2	1
Het Alternatief	1	3	1
Groep Groen	-	-	1
Faction Scheffers-Free and Independent (V&O)	3	-	-
Total	13	15	15

== Economy ==
Tourism is regarded as the main source of income for Vaals. The neighbouring coal and textile industries were largely lost starting from the 1960s. Most inhabitants commute today to the larger neighbouring cities of Heerlen, Kerkrade and Maastricht as well as to Aachen and surroundings. A sixth of the population is classified as poor in the current national poverty monitor of the Netherlands.

== Notable people ==
- John Bröcheler (1945–2026) a bass-baritone opera singer
- Eddy Verheijen (born 1946 in Vaals) a retired speed skater, competed at the 1972 Winter Olympics
- Ronald Waterreus (born 1970 in Lemiers) a Dutch former football goalkeeper with 423 club caps

== See also ==
- Saint Paul's Church, Vaals

== Gallery ==
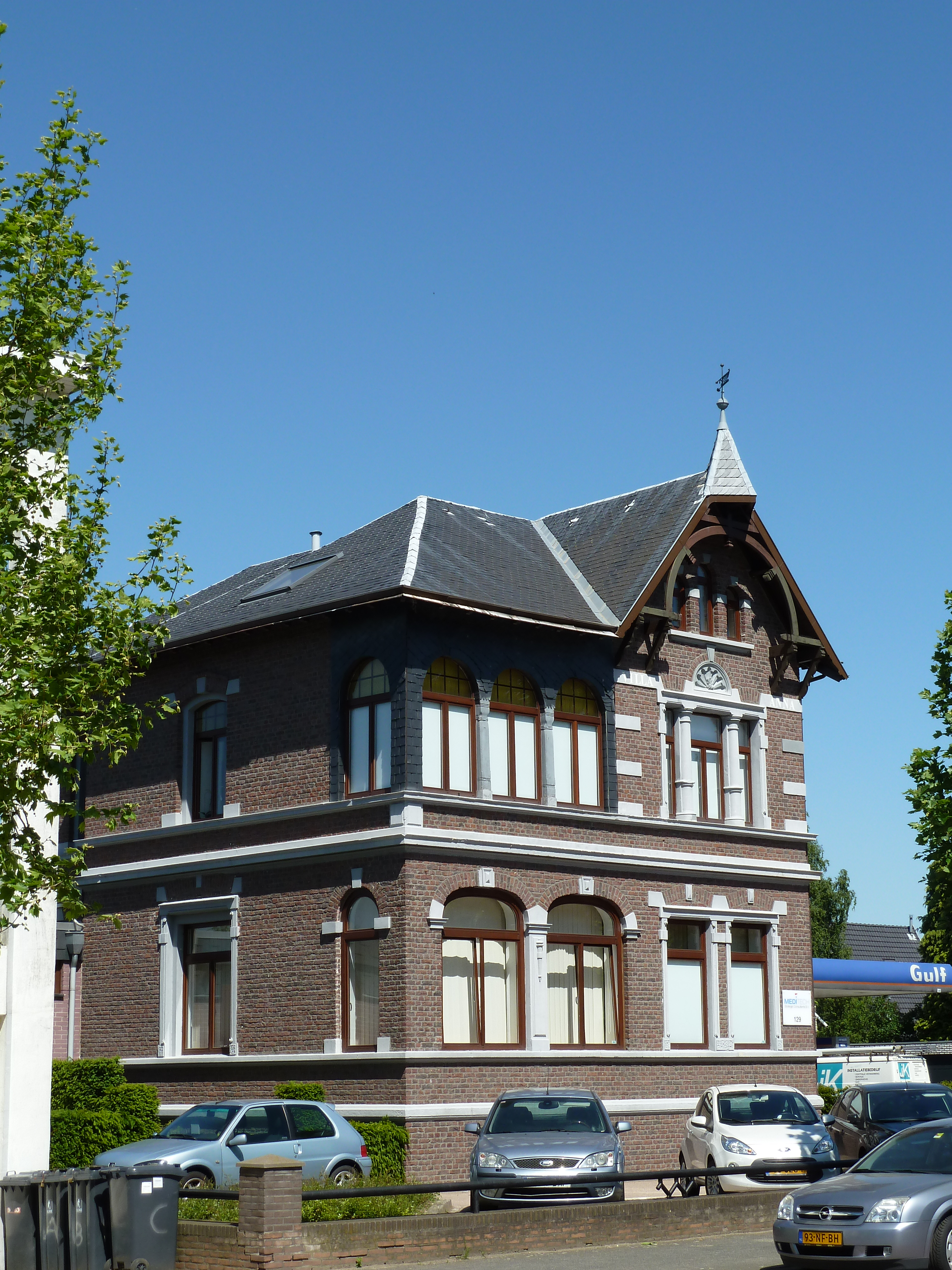
Vaals-Maastrichterlaan

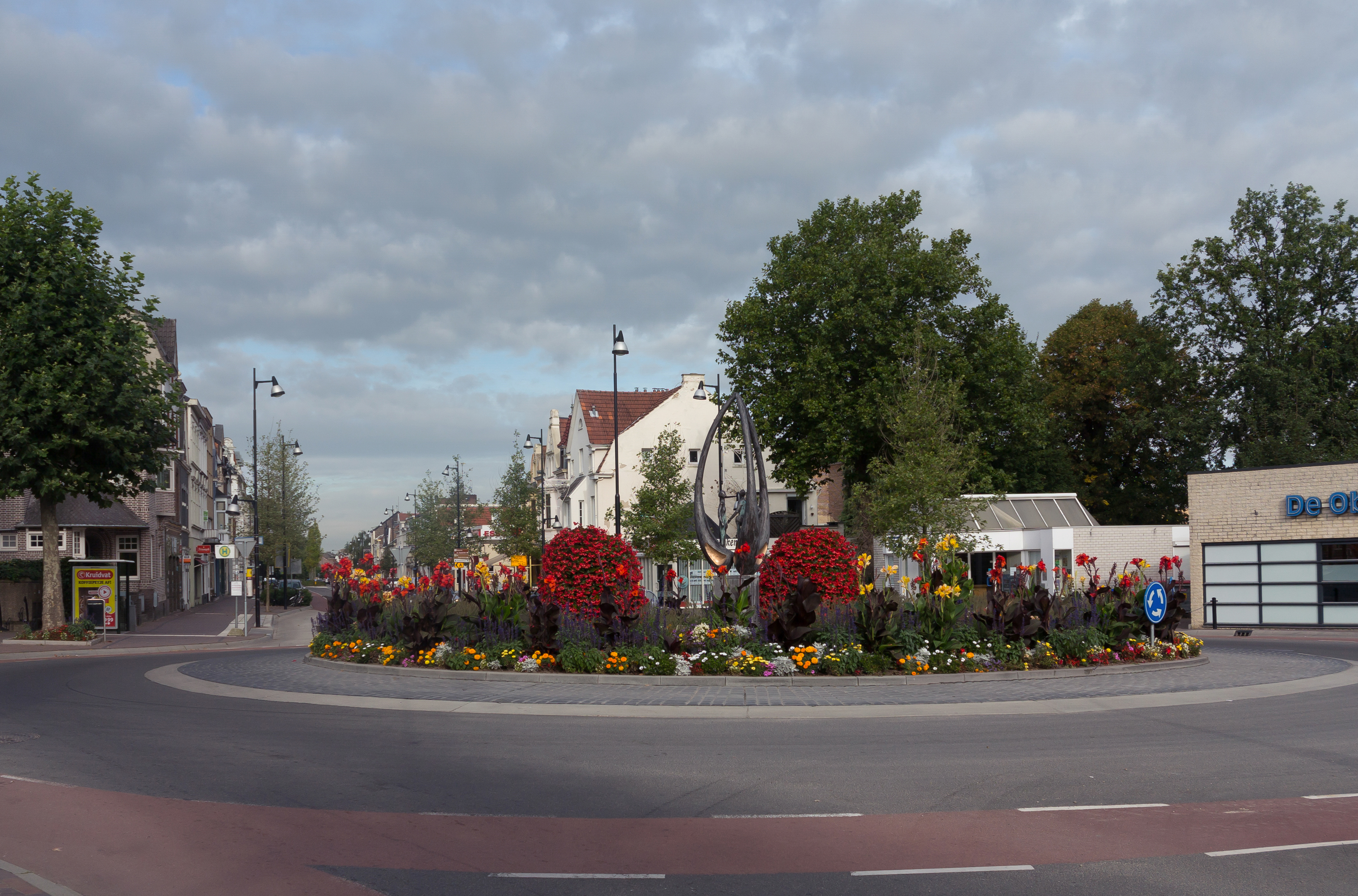
Vaals, square: Prins Willem Alexanderplein

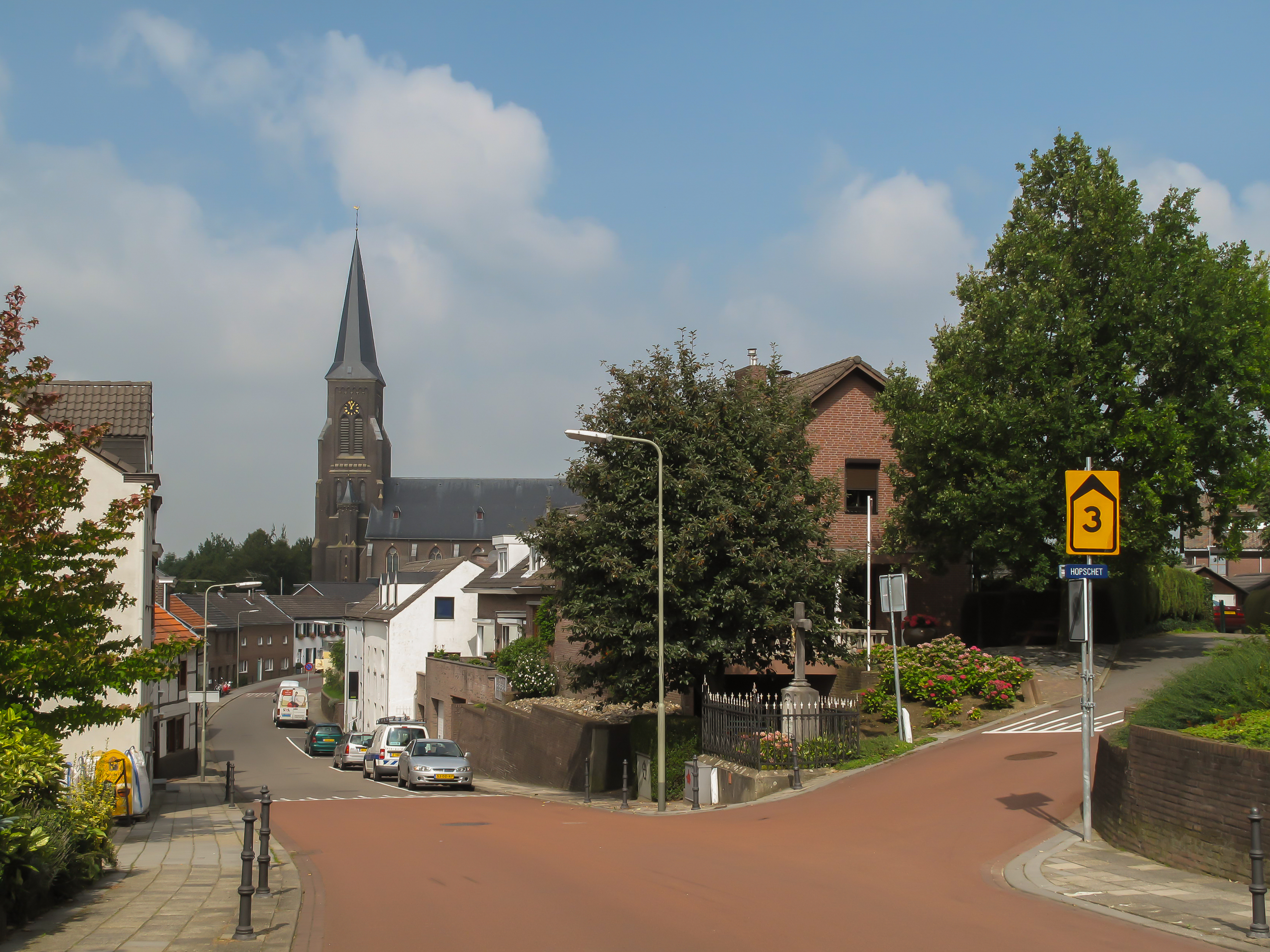
Vijlen, the village

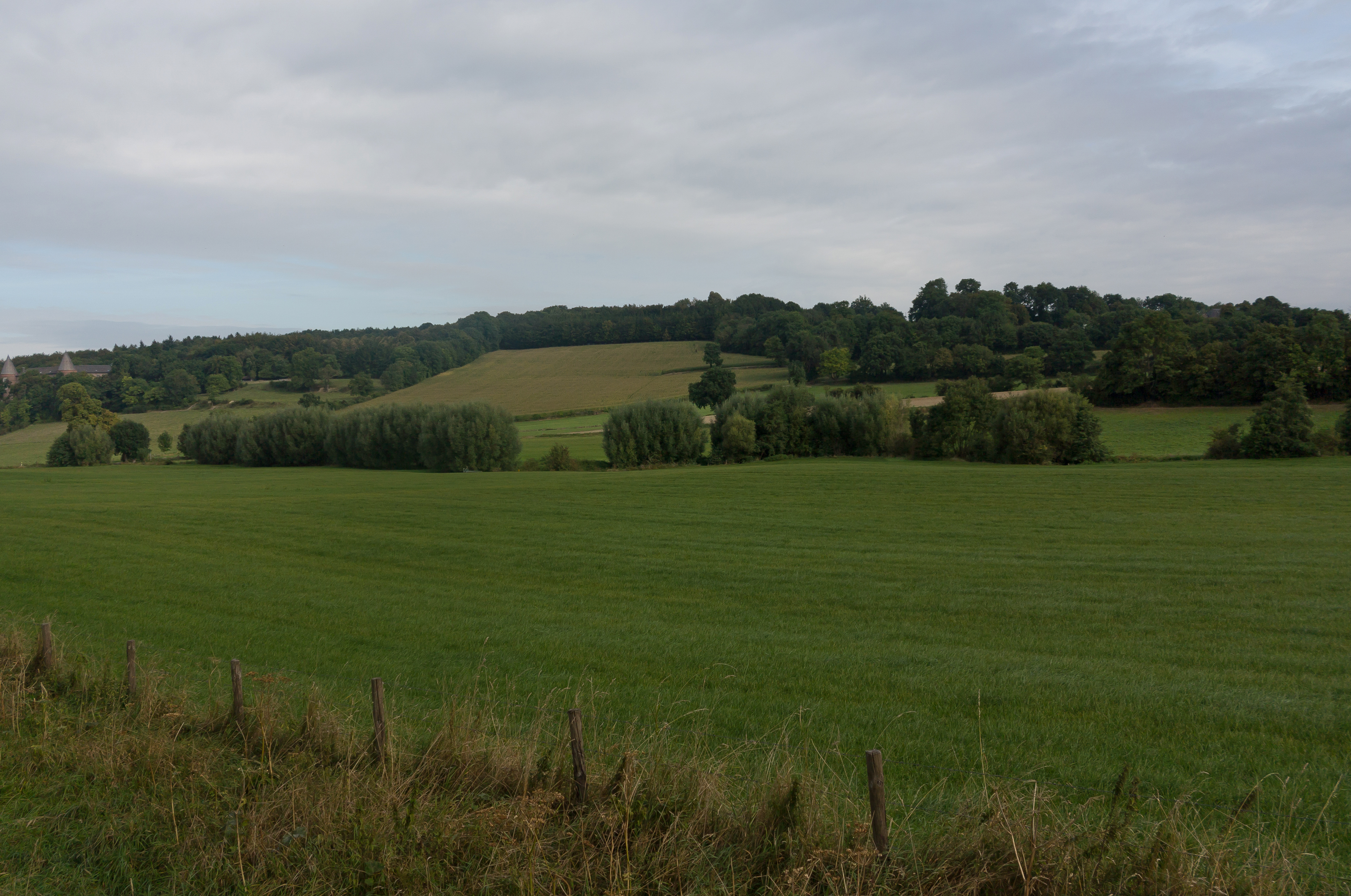
between Lemiers and Nijswiller, panorama
