= Holset, Netherlands =

Holset
- Village
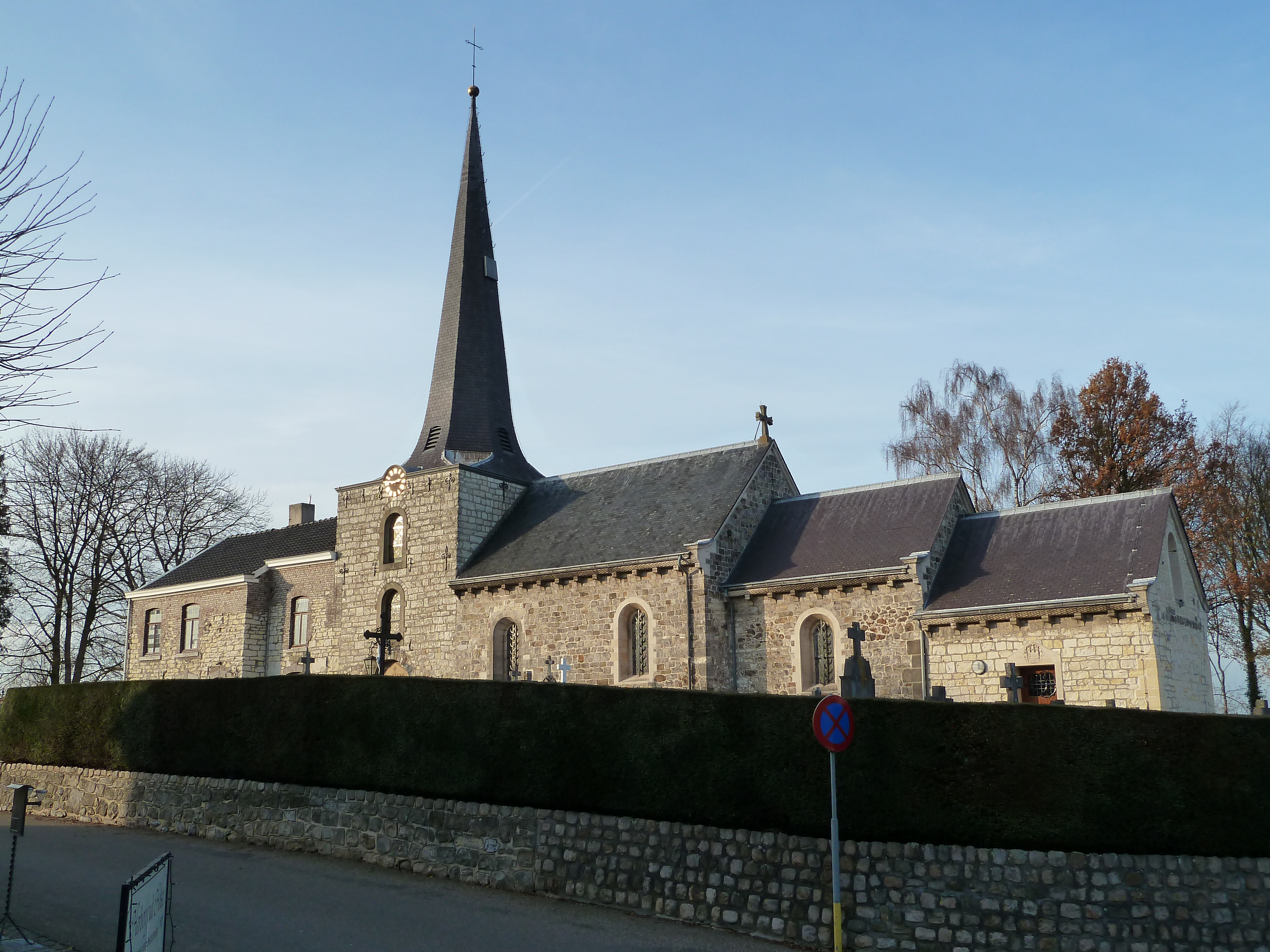
- St Lambertus and Genoveva Church

- Location in the Netherlands Location in the province of Limburg in the Netherlands
- Coordinates: 50°47′34″N 5°59′6″E
- Country: Netherlands
- Province: Limburg
- Municipality: Vaals

Area
  - Total: 2.85 km^{2} (1.10 sq mi)
- Elevation: 203 m (666 ft)

Population (2021)
  - Total: 135
  - Density: 47.4/km^{2} (123/sq mi)
- Time zone: UTC+1 (CET)
  - Summer (DST): UTC+2 (CEST)
- Postal code: 6291
- Dialing code: 043

Holset is a small village in the Dutch province of Limburg. It is located in the municipality of Vaals, about 2 km west of the town of Vaals itself. Holset is about 15 minutes by car from Aachen, just inside the Dutch border in South Limburg.

Holset has about 135 inhabitants, a vineyard, a church, hotel, bed-and-breakfast, and pub.

== History ==
The history of Holset started before the Common Era. On the small hill is the Lambertus-church, 2000 years ago there stood a temple of the Eburons (who defeated Caesar's armies). Caesar took terrible revenge and destroyed the Eburons and destroyed the temple.

Around 360 the bishop of Maastricht came to Holset to convert the population to Christianity. Some centuries later a church was built there. The Lambertus-church became popular for the marriages and a place of pilgrimage to the holy Genoveva of France (against eye-diseases and skin-rashes, esp. 18th century).

== Nature ==
Holset is a refuge for the rare Common Midwife Toad that used to be common all over Europe and is on the red list today. The Limburgish name for the toad, "Klükske", refers to their sound during mating season, which is similar to that of a tiny bell.

== Gallery ==
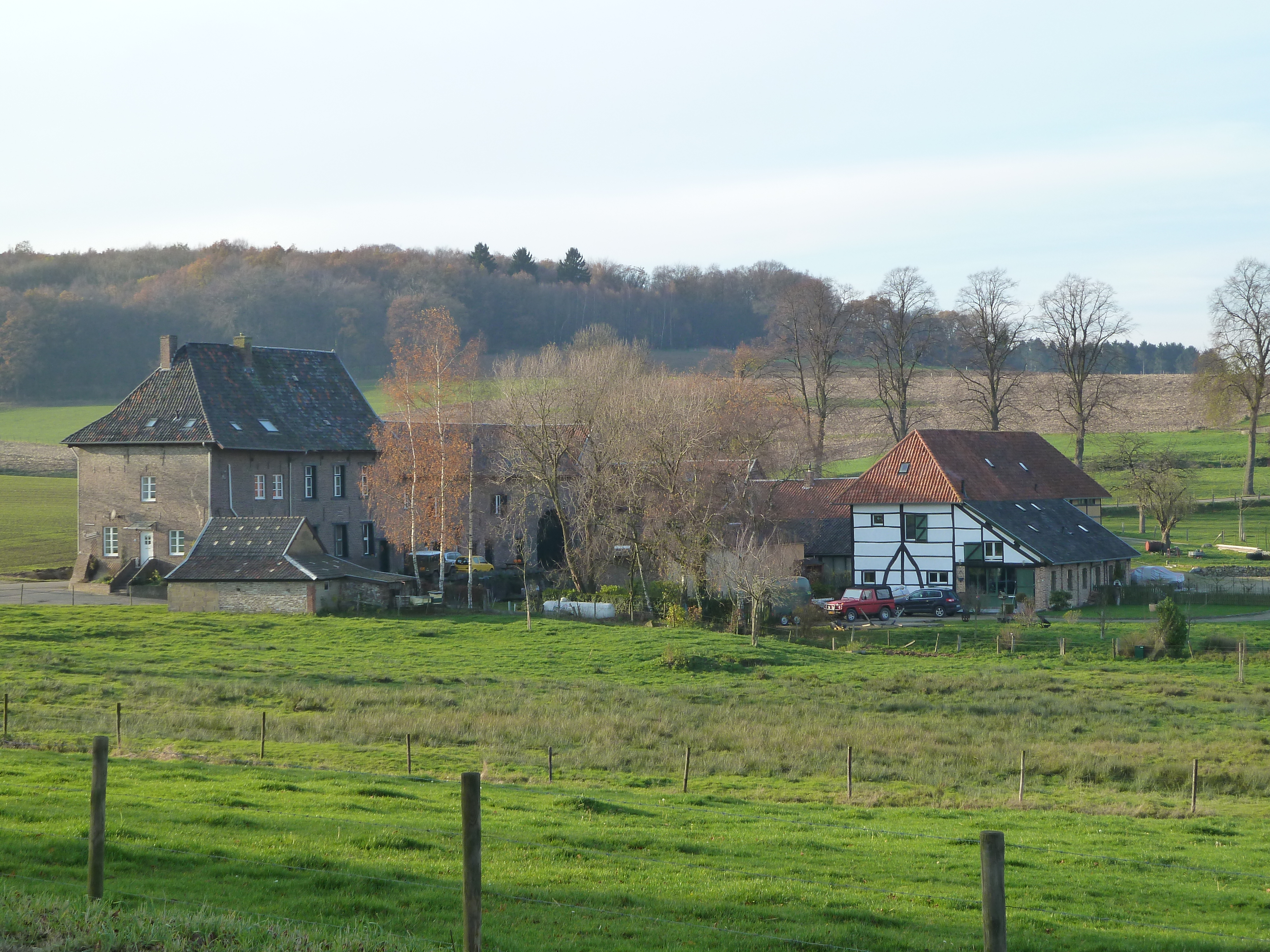
Farm in Holset

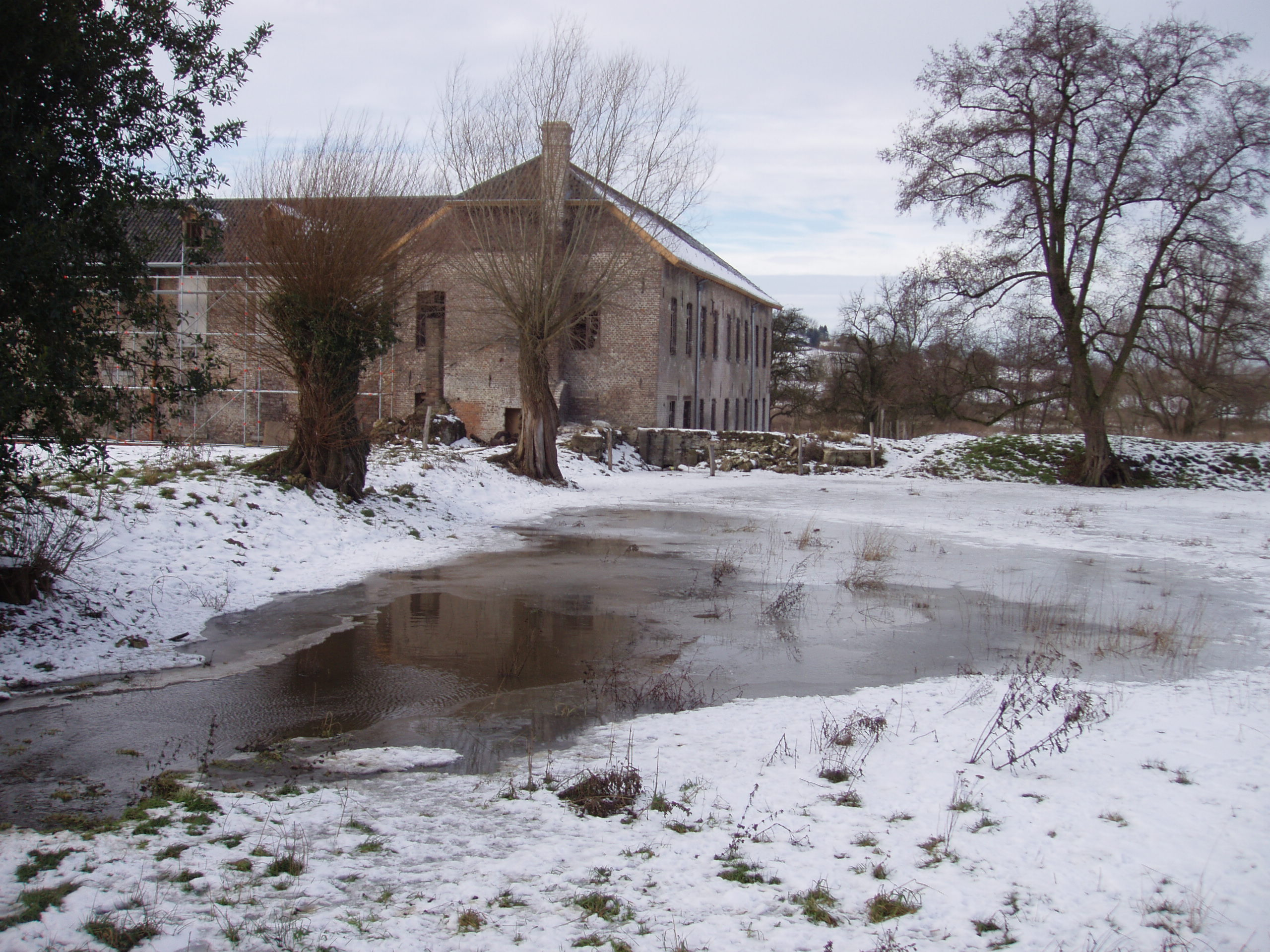
Watermill in Holset

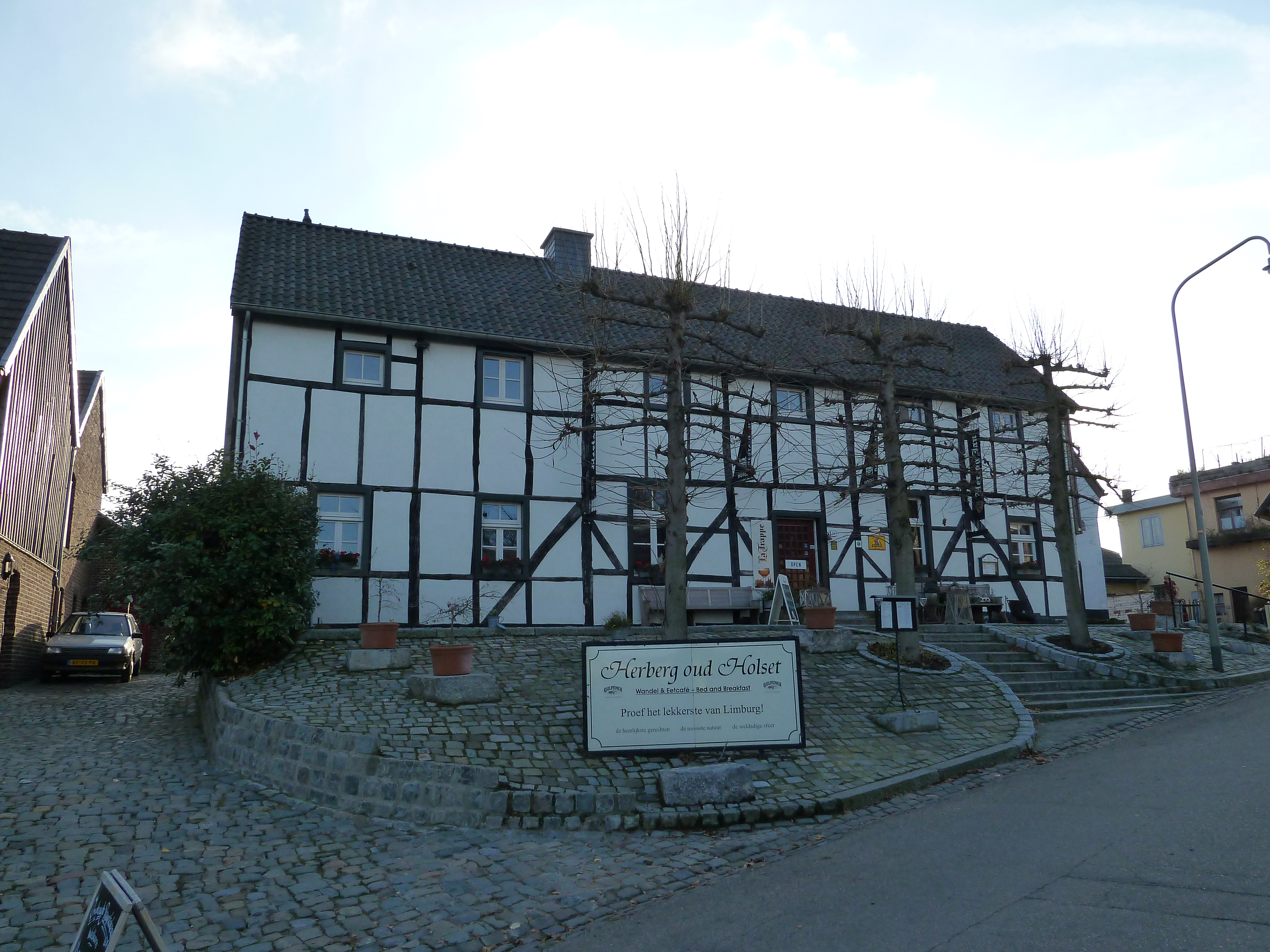
Inn in Holset

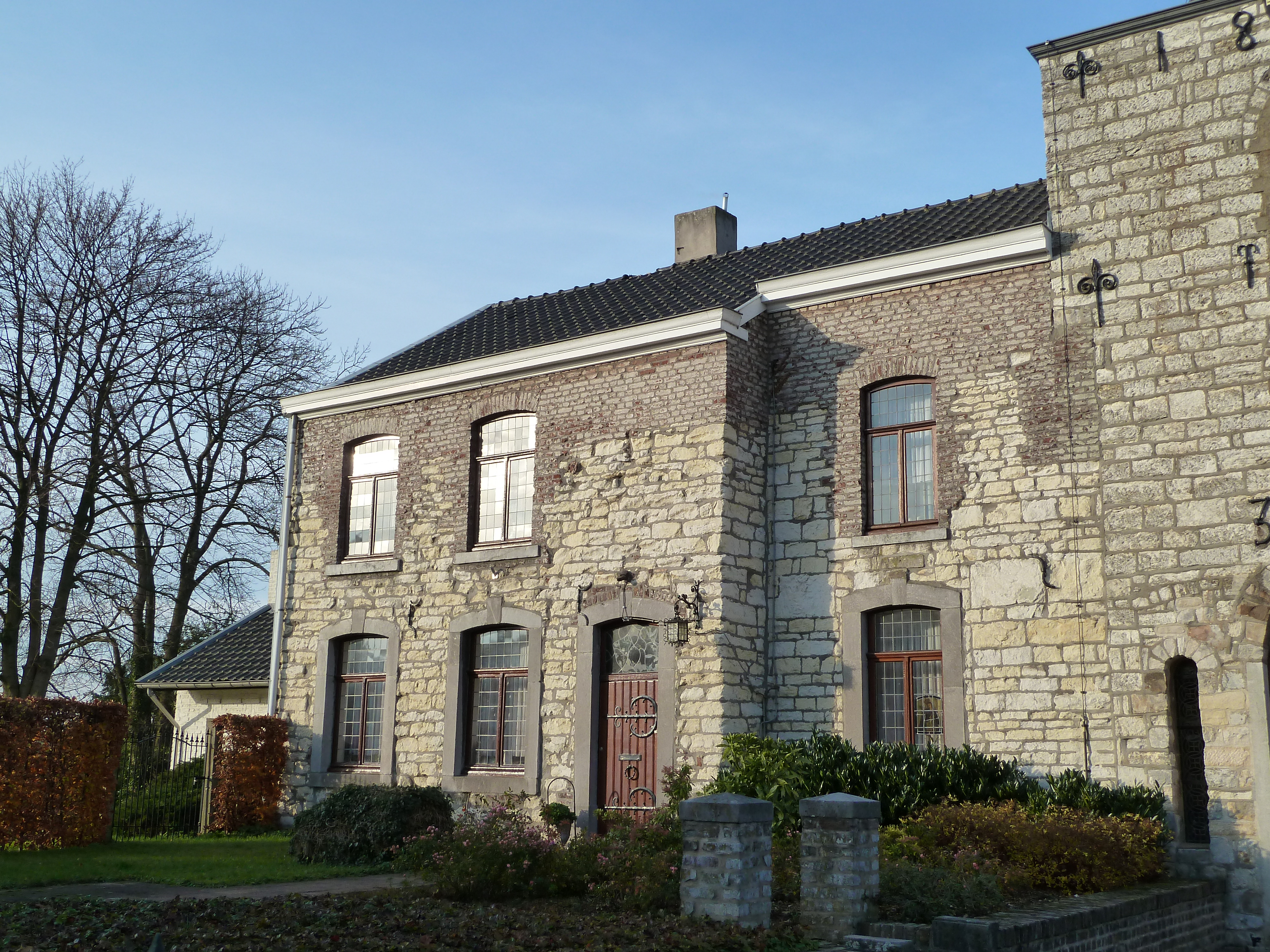
House in Holset
