= Herzogenrath =

Herzogenrath Herzeroa (Ripuarian)
- Town
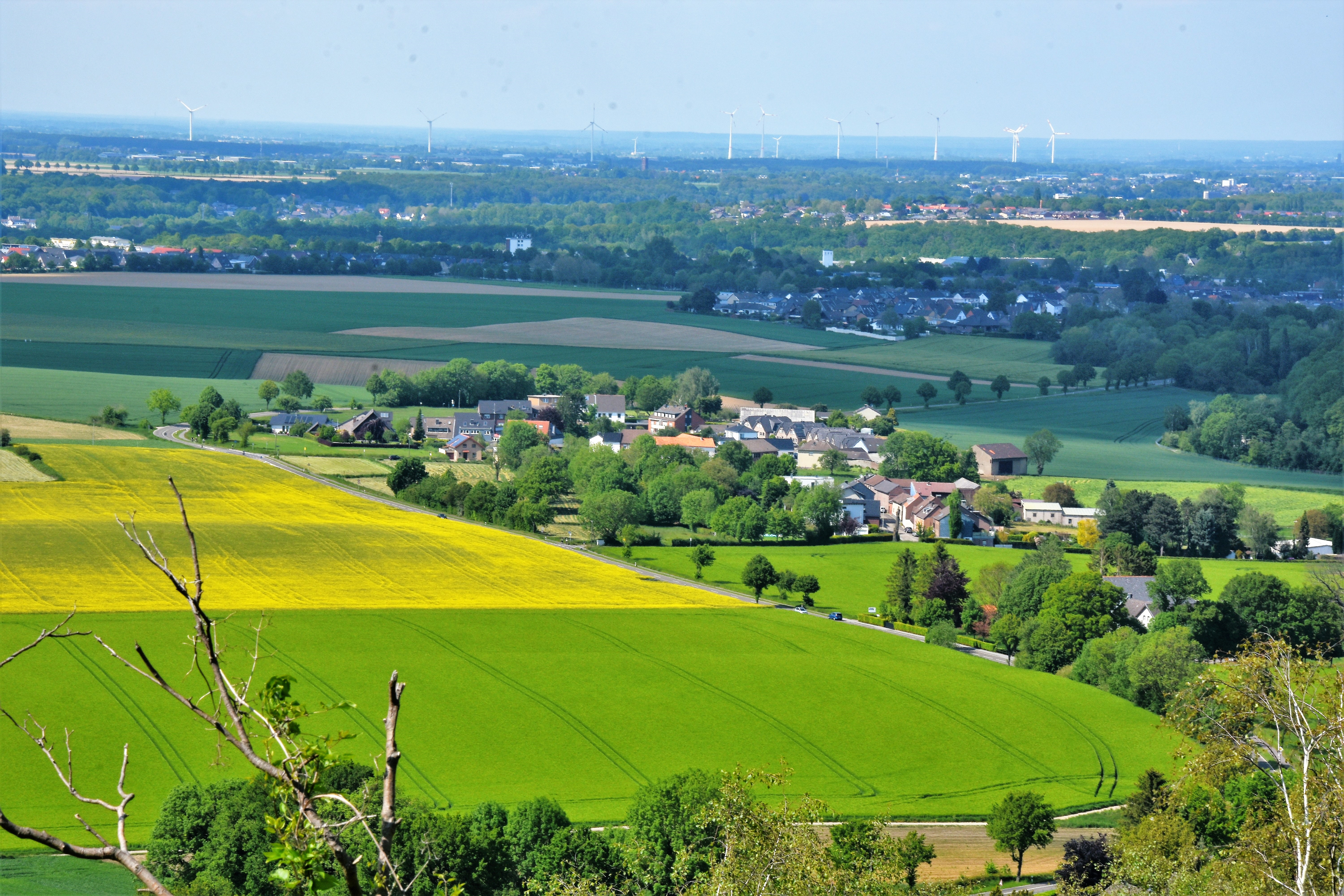

- Flag Coat of arms

- Location of Herzogenrath within Aachen district
- Interactive map of Herzogenrath
- Location within Germany Location within North Rhine-Westphalia
- Coordinates: 50°52′N 6°06′E
- Country: Germany
- State: North Rhine-Westphalia
- Admin. region: Köln
- District: Aachen
- Subdivisions: 3

Government
  - Mayor (2020–25): Benjamin Fadavian (SPD)

Area
  - Total: 33.38 km^{2} (12.89 sq mi)
- Elevation: 140 m (460 ft)

Population (2025-12-31)
  - Total: 48,666
  - Density: 1,458/km^{2} (3,776/sq mi)
- Time zone: UTC+01:00 (CET)
  - Summer (DST): UTC+02:00 (CEST)
- Postal codes: 52134
- Dialling codes: 02406 and 02407
- Vehicle registration: AC
- Website: www.herzogenrath.de

Herzogenrath (Note: Pronounced [ˌhɛʁtsoːɡn̩ˈʁaːt] in German and [ˌɦɛrtsoːɡə(n)ˈraːt] in Dutch, locally [ˌɦæχtsoːɡə(n)ˈʁaːt].) (Ripuarian: Herzeroa; (Note: Pronounced [ˈɦæχtsəʁoə]. In the Netherlands, the name is spelled Hertseroa.) Limburgish: Hertseraoj; (Note: Pronounced [ˈɦæʀtsəʀɔːj].) Dutch: 's-Hertogenrade) (Note: Pronounced [ˌsɛrtoːɣə(n)ˈraːdə], locally [ˌsæχtoːʁə(n)ˈʁaːdə].) is a municipality in the district of Aachen in the German state of North Rhine-Westphalia. It borders the Dutch town of Kerkrade, the national border in one section running along the middle of a main road and even directly through the centre of the cross-border Eurode office complex.

== History ==
Herzogenrath began in the 11th century as a settlement called Rode near the river Wurm. In 1104, Augustinian monks founded an abbey, called Kloosterrade, to the west of this settlement.

It became 's-Hertogenrode or 's-Hertogenrade (Dutch: the Duke's Rode) after the Duchy of Brabant took control of the region; in French it was called Rolduc (Rode-le-Duc).

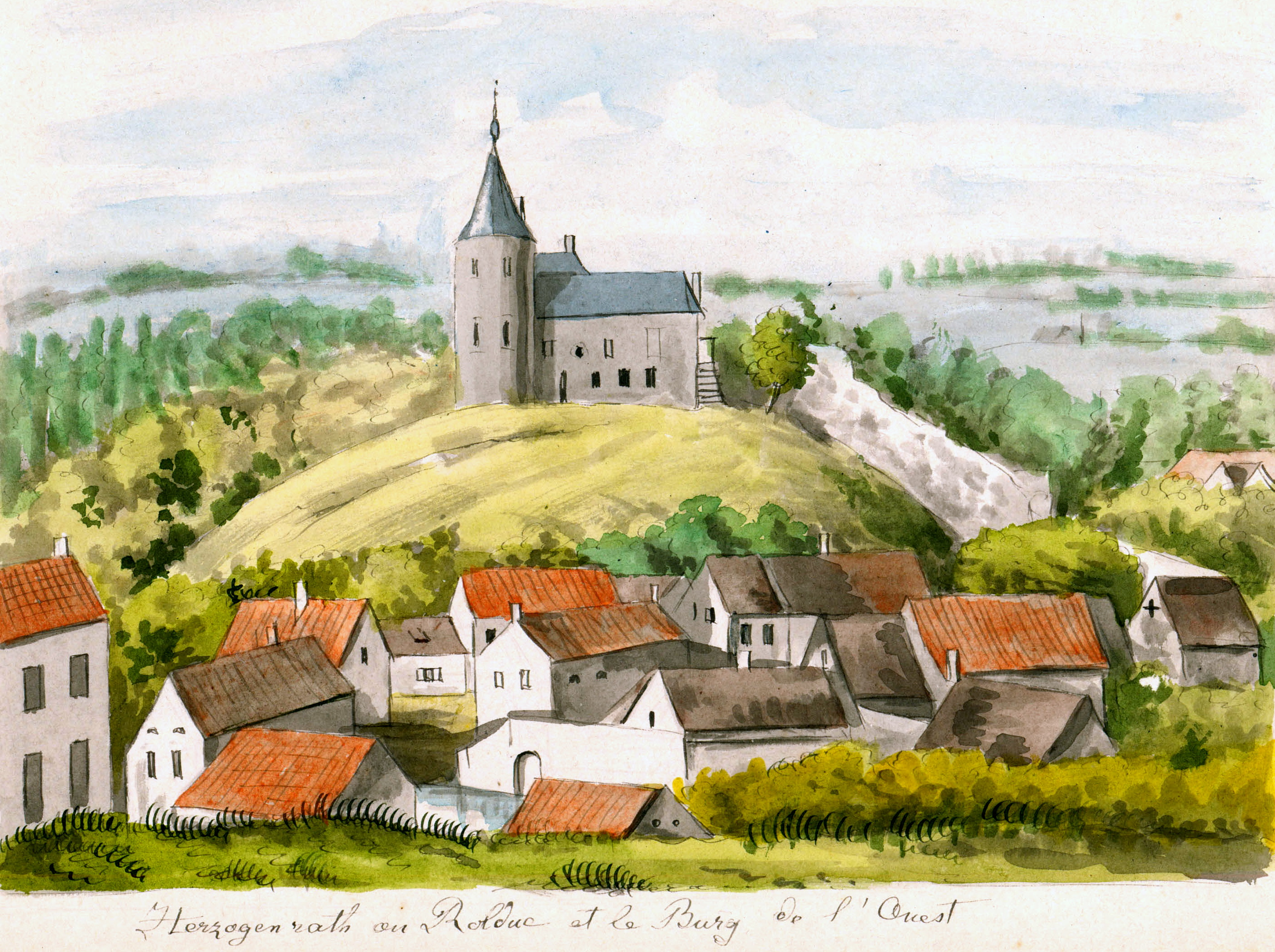
Herzogenrath c. 1840

As is the case for many parts of Duchy of Brabant, Herzogenrath changed hands several times in the last few centuries. Together with the rest of the Southern Netherlands, it was under Spanish control from 1661, Austrian between 1713 and 1795 and French between 1795 and 1813. In 1815, when the Kingdom of the Netherlands was formed under the terms of the Vienna Congress, the border was drawn through the town, the eastern part being Prussian Herzogenrath and the western part Dutch Kerkrade. The former abbey is now the Rolduc Congress Center in Kerkrade.

During World War I, the Germans erected a fortification along the border street for the first time; although it was dismantled at the end of the war, it was reconstructed again at the beginning of World War II. Following the end of that war, the border fortifications were reduced at various times, although they were not fully dismantled until the early 1990s preparations for the Schengen Area.

The two towns now share some of their public services, and promote themselves as a binational "City of Eurode" for economic development purposes.

== Population ==
Historical population

Year	Pop.	±% p.a.
1965	41,592	—
1970	41,463	−0.06%
1975	42,710	+0.59%
1980	42,721	+0.01%
1985	43,271	+0.26%
1990	44,284	+0.46%
1995	45,935	+0.73%

Year	Pop.	±% p.a.
2000	46,853	+0.40%
2005	47,295	+0.19%
2010	46,708	−0.25%
2015	46,583	−0.05%
2020	46,225	−0.15%
2025	48,666	+1.03%

Source: Landesdatabank Nordrhein-Westfalen

== Culture ==
In addition to Standard German, many inhabitants of Herzogenrath speak the Kerkrade dialect, a Ripuarian variety also spoken on the other side of the border in Kerkrade.

== Economy ==
Until the 1950s, Herzogenrath's economy was dominated by coal mines and a nearby coking plant. While some remains of the mining industry still form parts of the landscape in the form of overgrown slag heaps, today's Herzogenrath has moved into other industries. Large-scale employers include Saint-Gobain, Aixtron, Vetrotex (textile glass) and Ericsson Eurolab (electronics). The city hosts a number of electronics start-ups, profiting from the neighbouring Technical University RWTH Aachen.

== Twin towns – sister cities ==
Herzogenrath is twinned with:

- Bistrița, Romania
- Plérin, France

== Gallery ==
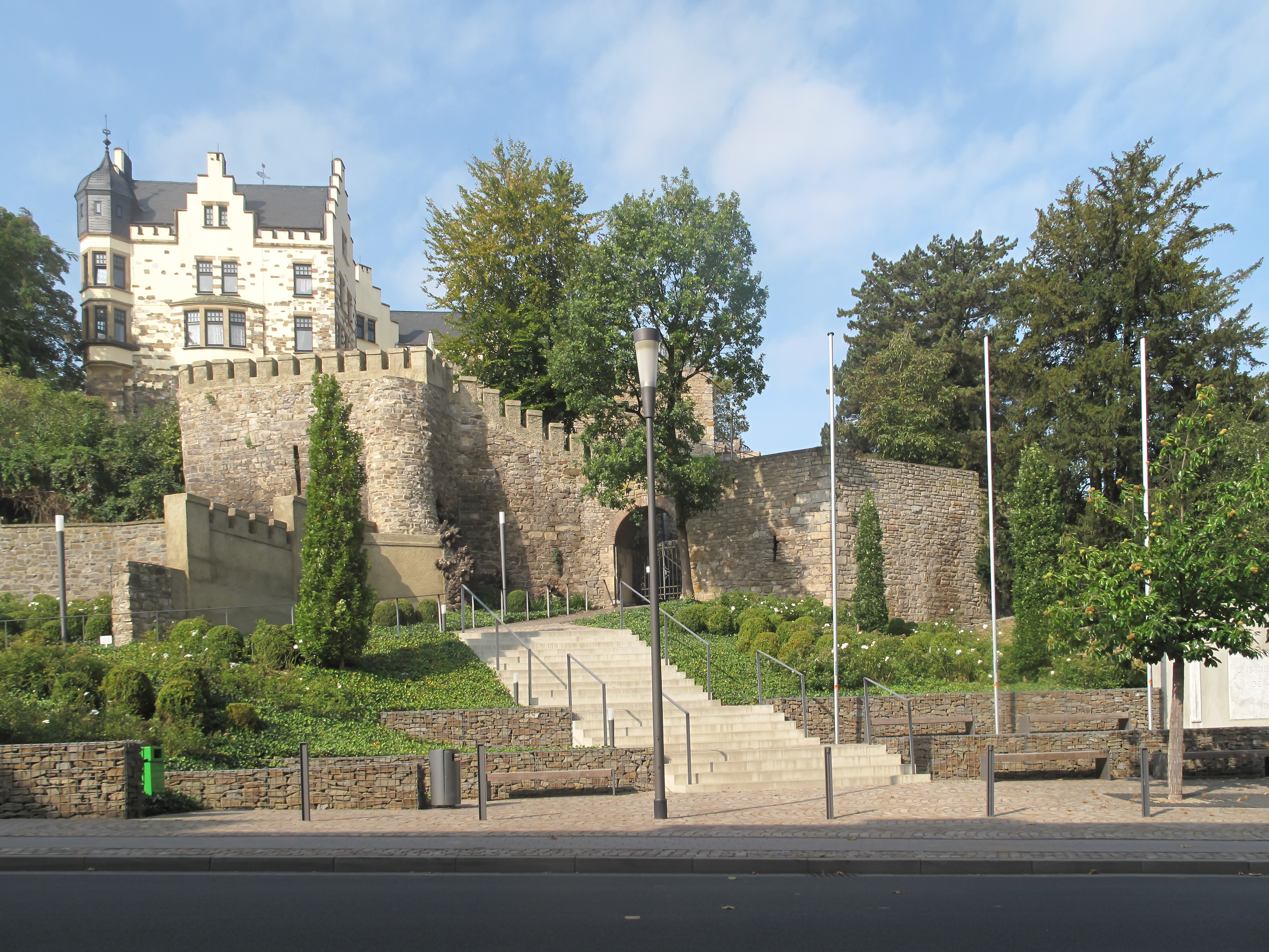
Rode Castle

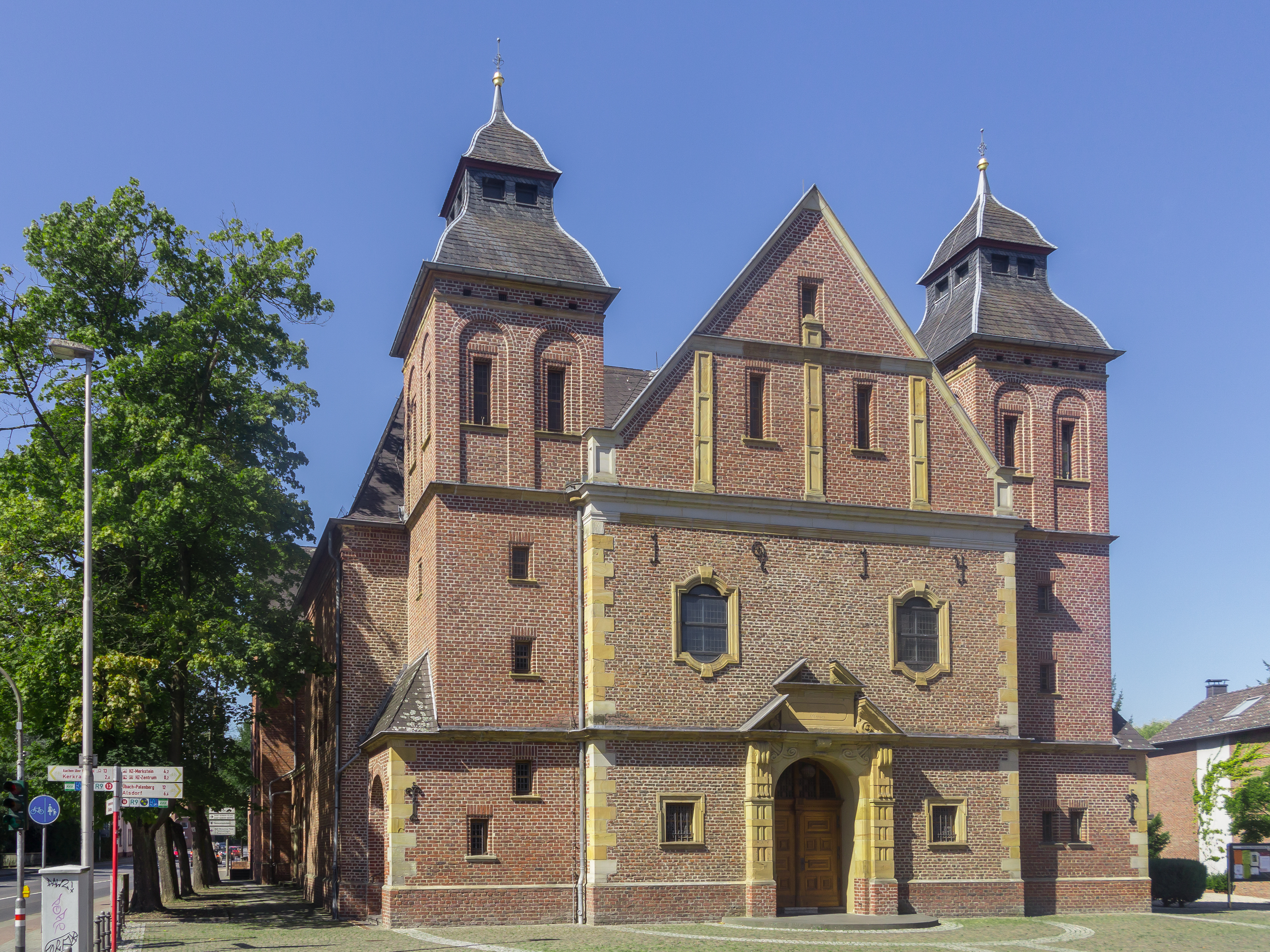
Church of Saint Gertrude of Nivelles

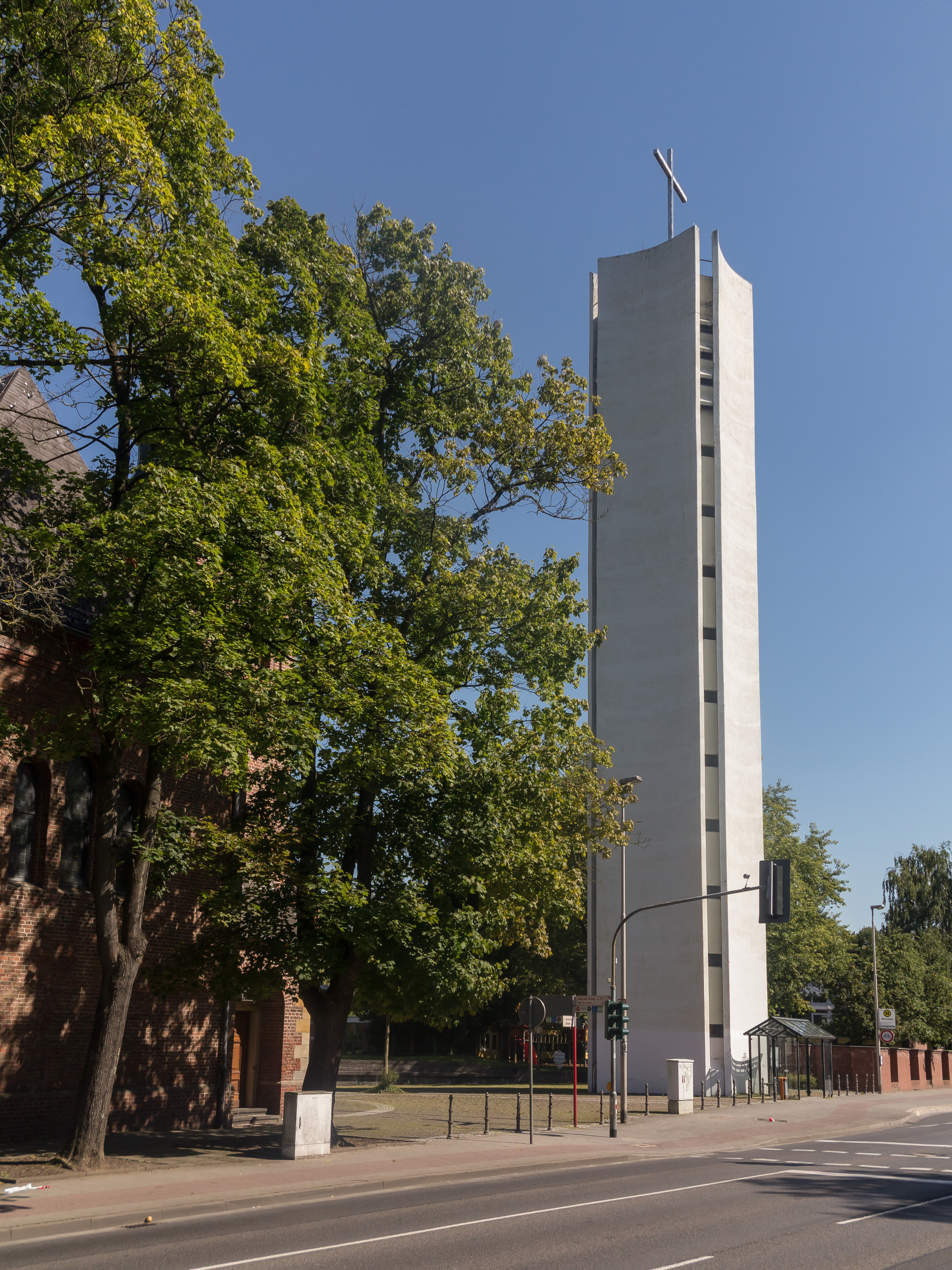
Church tower of the Church of Saint Gertrude of Nivelles

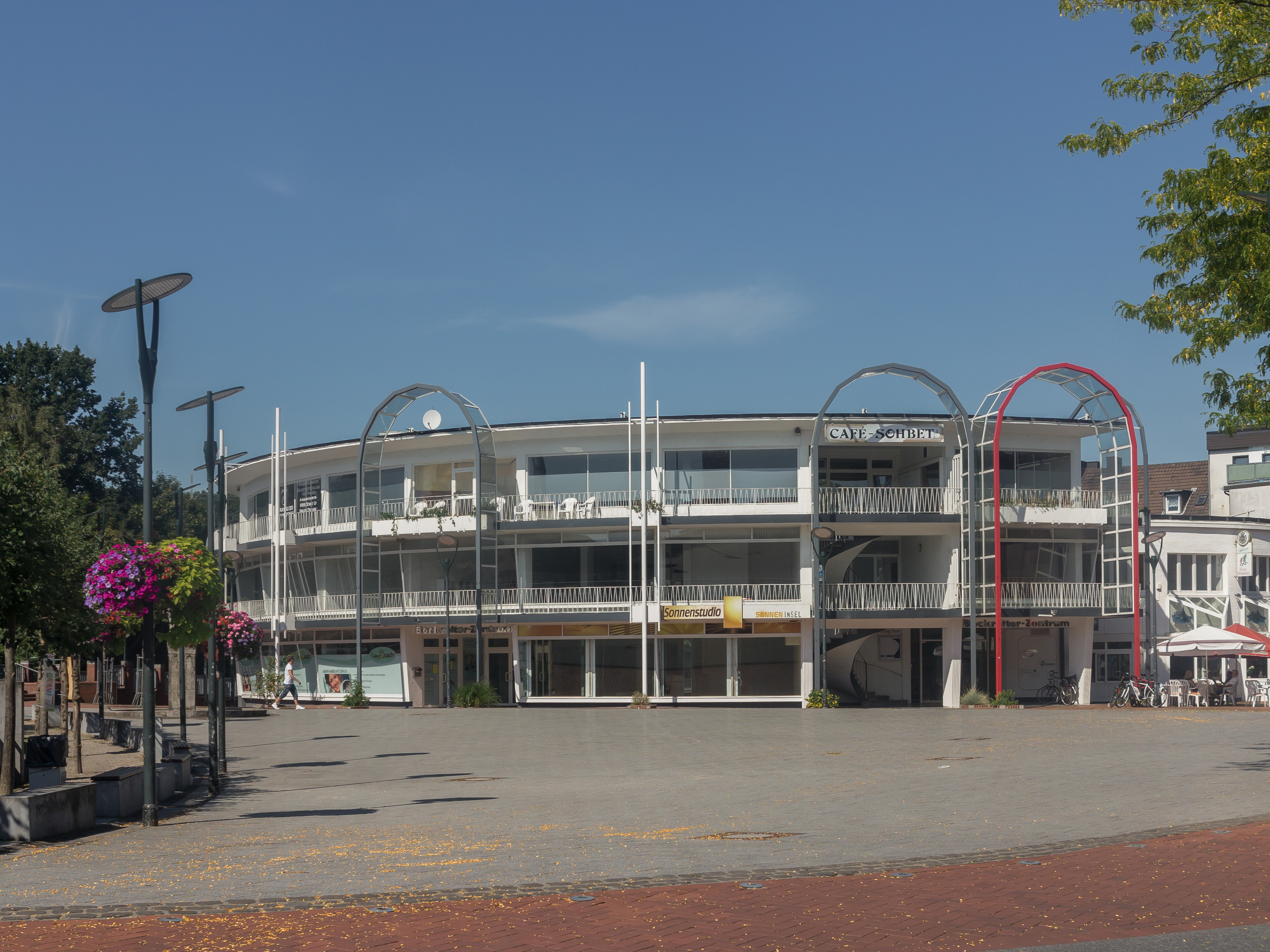
Ferdinand Schmetz Square
